= List of transit routes in Minneapolis–Saint Paul =

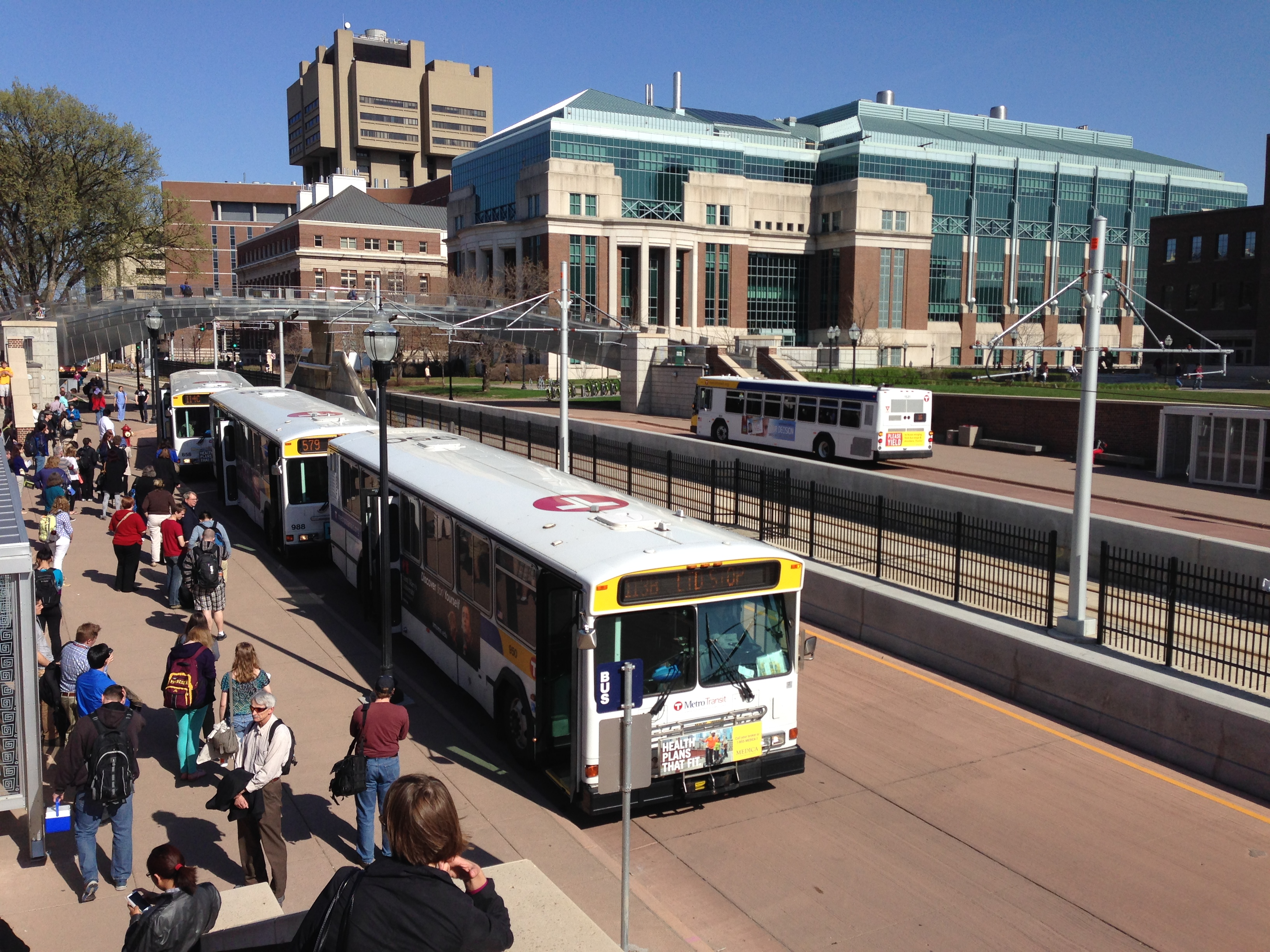
Several routes meet during rush hour at the University of Minnesota.

The following is a list of bus routes operating in the Twin Cities metropolitan area. A majority of routes are operated by Metro Transit, but some are operated by suburban "opt-out" providers or are under contract. There are two light rail lines and eight bus rapid transit lines. Almost all routes operate within the seven county metro area defined by the Metropolitan Council.

== METRO ==
METRO

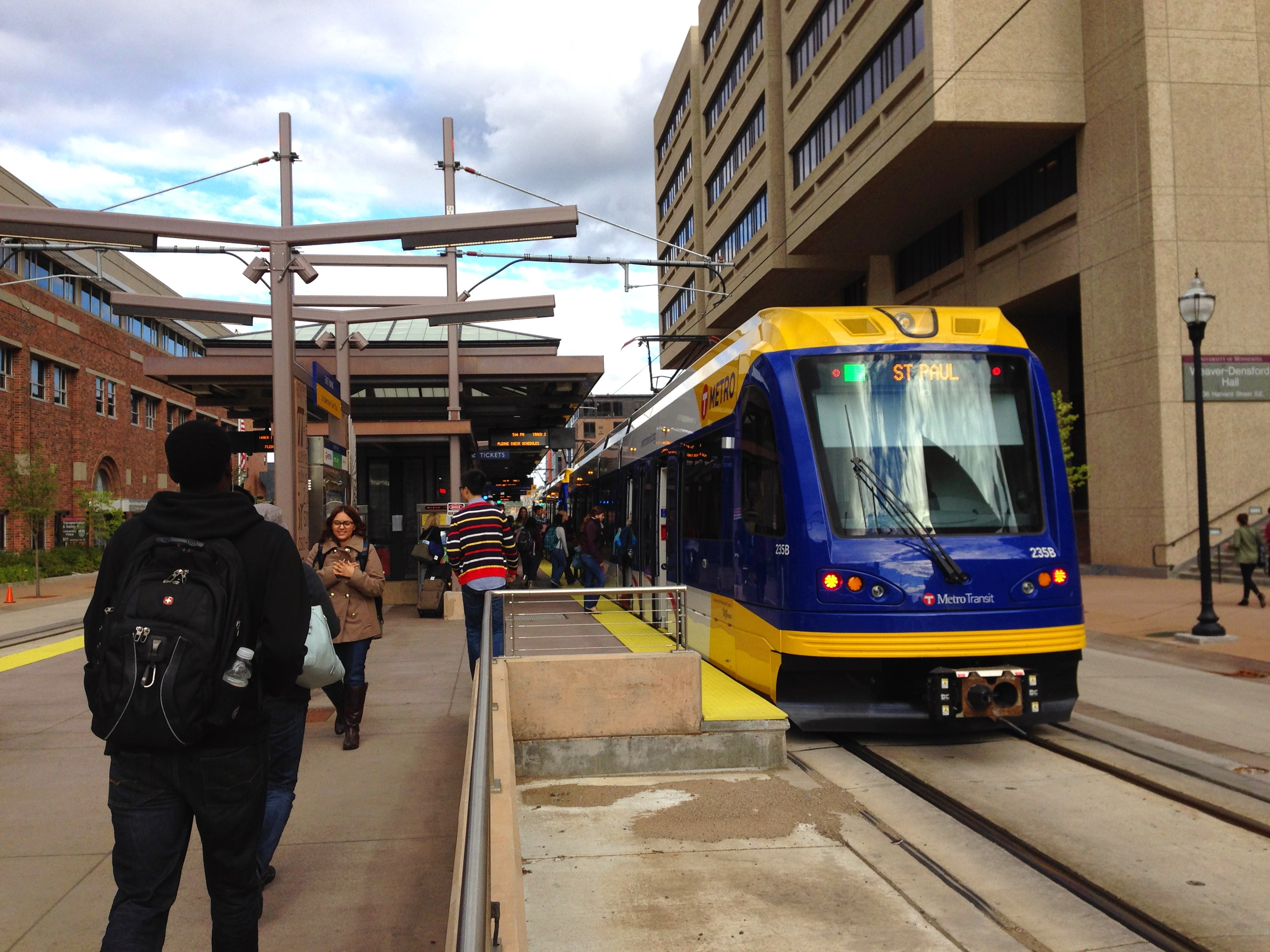
Light rail transit

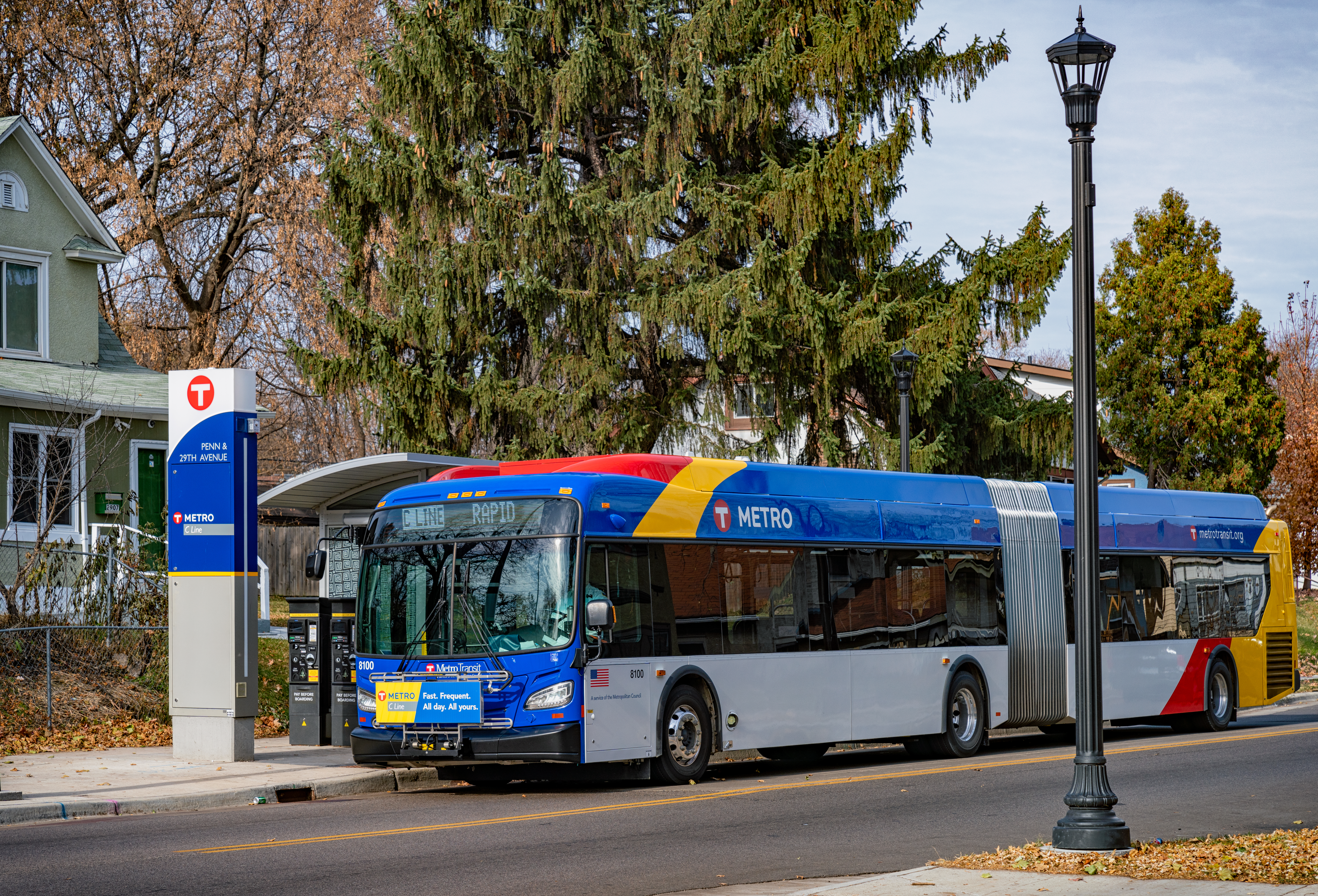
Bus rapid transit

METRO is the branding used for fast, frequent, and all-day light rail and bus rapid transit lines operated by Metro Transit. There are three rapid transit lines and three extensions of existing lines in advanced planning or under construction.

Metro (Minnesota)	Mode	Terminals		Major streets	Cities	Notes
Blue	LRT	Target Field Station	Mall of America Station	5th Street, Hiawatha Avenue	Minneapolis, Fort Snelling, Minneapolis-Saint Paul International Airport, Bloomington	24–hour free airport shuttle between Terminal 1–Lindbergh station and Terminal 2–Humphrey station.; Planned extension to Brooklyn Park expected to open 2030.
Green	LRT	Target Field Station	Saint Paul Union Depot	5th Street, University Avenue, Cedar Avenue	Minneapolis, Saint Paul	Night Owl service provided by bus; suspended March 25, 2020 due to COVID-19 pandemic.; Extension to Eden Prairie under construction and expected to open 2027.
Gold	BRT	Smith Avenue Transit Center	Woodlane Drive	5th–6th Streets, busway adjacent to Interstate 94	Saint Paul, Maplewood, Landfall, Oakdale, Woodbury	Minnesota's first bus rapid transit line to operate in a dedicated busway.; Extension to downtown Minneapolis expected to open 2027.
Orange	BRT	Marquette-2nd Avenue & 3rd Street	Burnsville Heart of the City	Marq2 transit corridor, Interstate 35W	Minneapolis, Richfield, Bloomington, Burnsville	
Red	BRT	Mall of America Station	Apple Valley Station	Cedar Avenue	Bloomington, Eagan, Minnesota, Apple Valley	Formerly operated by Minnesota Valley Transit Authority prior to December 2020.
A	BRT	Rosedale Transit Center	46th Street Station	Snelling Avenue, Ford Parkway, 46th Street	Minneapolis, Saint Paul, Falcon Heights, Lauderdale, Roseville	Seasonal station during the Minnesota State Fair.
B	BRT	West Lake Station	Saint Paul Union Depot	Lake Street, Marshall Avenue, Selby Avenue	Brooklyn Center, Minneapolis	
C	BRT	Brooklyn Center Transit Center	7th-8th Street & Park station	Brooklyn Boulevard, Penn Ave, Olson Memorial Highway, 7th–8th Streets	Brooklyn Center, Minneapolis	
D	BRT	Brooklyn Center Transit Center	Mall of America Station	Brooklyn Boulevard, Fremont-Emerson Avenues, 7th-8th Streets, Chicago Avenue, Portland Avenue	Brooklyn Center, Minneapolis, Richfield, Bloomington	
E	BRT	Southdale Center	Westgate Station	France Avenue, Hennepin Avenue, University Avenue	Edina, Minneapolis, Saint Paul	

From 2009 to 2026, Northstar operated from downtown Minneapolis to the northwestern suburbs. A shuttle bus, Northstar Link, extended the service to Saint Cloud. The line shut down in early 2026 due to declining ridership.

Line	Terminals		Railroad subdivisions/Major streets	Cities	Notes
Northstar	Target Field Station	Big Lake Station	Wayzata Subdivision, Midway Subdivision, Staples Subdivision	Minneapolis, Fridey, Fridey, Coon Rapids, Anoka, Ramsey, Elk River, Big Lake	An extension to Saint Cloud was under consideration.
Link	Big Lake Station	Metro Bus Transit Center, SCSU	Highway 10	Big Lake, Becker, Saint Cloud	

== Routes 1–99 (Minneapolis–Saint Paul) ==
Routes 1–99 are urban local bus routes primarily in Minneapolis and Saint Paul, often running into the first-ring suburbs. Most routes are operated by Metro Transit, however some low-ridership routes are operated contracted to private operators through the Metropolitan Council. Routes 1–49 are Minneapolis-anchored lines, Route 54 is limited-stop line, Routes 60–89 are Saint Paul-anchored lines, and Route 94 is an express line between the two downtowns.

Key
	Metropolitan Council contract route
●	Night Owl route
†	Suspended due to COVID-19 pandemic and driver shortage

Route	Terminals (Note: Routes may have multiple end points. For clarity, only primary terminals are given.)		Major streets	Cities	Notes
2	Franklin Avenue and Hennepin Avenue	A: Stadium Village Station	Franklin Avenue, Riverside Avenue, Washington Avenue, University Ave SE, 10th Avenue SE, 8th Street SE	Minneapolis, University of Minnesota	First Better Bus Routes improvement, implemented October 13, 2018.
2	Franklin Avenue and Hennepin Avenue	C: Hennepin Avenue and Central Avenue	Franklin Avenue, Riverside Avenue, Washington Avenue, University Ave SE, 10th Avenue SE, 8th Street SE	Minneapolis, University of Minnesota	First Better Bus Routes improvement, implemented October 13, 2018.
3	North Loop	Union Depot	Washington Avenue, 15th Ave SE, Como Avenue, Maryland Avenue, Rice Street, Front Avenue, Cedar–Wabasha Street	Minneapolis, University of Minnesota, Falcon Heights, Saint Paul	Inaugurated June 9, 2001 under the Northeast Restructuring plan.; Third Better Bus Routes improvement, implemented August 21, 2021.; Downtown Minneapolis-Maryland Avenue to Rice Street corridor to be replaced by the Metro H Line, continuing along Maryland to Sun Ray Transit Center.; Extra buses with destination sign 3F run during the Minnesota State Fair between Highway 280 and U of M Transitway.
4	Silver Lake Road and 39th Avenue	82nd Street Transit Center	Penn Ave S, Lyndale Ave S, Bryant Ave S, Johnson St. NE	Saint Anthony, Minneapolis, Richfield, Bloomington	Planned mid-term bus rapid transit implementation between 2030 and 2035.
5^{●}	Brooklyn Center Transit Center	Chicago Avenue and 56th Street	Brooklyn Boulevard, Fremont–Emerson Avenue, 7th–8th Street, Chicago Avenue	Brooklyn Center, Minneapolis	Underlying local service for Metro D Line; Night Owl service suspended March 25, 2020 due to COVID-19 pandemic.
7	Wirth Chalet	66th Street and Richfield Parkway	Plymouth Avenue, Washington Avenue, Riverside Avenue, Minnehaha Avenue	Golden Valley, Minneapolis, Richfield, Fort Snelling	Peak-direction trips extend to VA Medical Center station.
9	C: Louisiana Avenue Transit Center	46th Street station	Cedar Lake Road, Glenwood Avenue, 8th–9th Street, Park–Portland Avenue, Franklin Avenue, 25th Street, 36th Avenue, 42nd Avenue	Minnetonka, Saint Louis Park, Golden Valley, Minneapolis, Richfield	
9	N: Greenbrier Road & Hopkins Crossroad	46th Street station	Cedar Lake Road, Glenwood Avenue, 8th–9th Street, Park–Portland Avenue, Franklin Avenue, 25th Street, 36th Avenue, 42nd Avenue	Minnetonka, Saint Louis Park, Golden Valley, Minneapolis, Richfield	
10^{●}	C: Columbia Heights Transit Center H: 53rd Ave & Target N/U: Northtown Transit Center	Leamington Ramp & Lower - Gate #7	Central Avenue University Avenue Nicollet Mall	Blaine, Spring Lake Park, Columbia Heights, Hilltop, Minneapolis	Free rides south on Nicollet Mall.; To be replaced by the Metro F Line, expected to open 2027.; Night Owl service suspended March 25, 2020 due to COVID-19 pandemic.
11	Columbia Heights Transit Center	I-35W & 46th Street station	2nd Street NE, Nicollet Mall, 4th Avenue	Columbia Heights, Minneapolis	
14	Robbinsdale Transit Center	C: 66th Street and Richfield Parkway	West Broadway, 6th–7th Street, Bloomington Avenue	Golden Valley, Robbinsdale, Crystal, Minneapolis, Richfield	West Broadway corridor a planned mid-term bus rapid transit implementation between 2030 and 2035, to be paired with the Cedar Avenue corridor of Route 22.
14	Robbinsdale Transit Center	E: 38th Street station	West Broadway, 6th–7th Street, Bloomington Avenue	Golden Valley, Robbinsdale, Crystal, Minneapolis, Richfield	West Broadway corridor a planned mid-term bus rapid transit implementation between 2030 and 2035, to be paired with the Cedar Avenue corridor of Route 22.
17	Central Avenue and 26th Avenue	D: Blake Road station	Texas Avenue, Minnetonka Boulevard, Hennepin Avenue, 24th Street, Nicollet Mall, Central Avenue, Washington Street	Hopkins, Saint Louis Park, Minneapolis	
17	Central Avenue and 26th Avenue	F: 36th Street and Woodale Avenue	Texas Avenue, Minnetonka Boulevard, Hennepin Avenue, 24th Street, Nicollet Mall, Central Avenue, Washington Street	Hopkins, Saint Louis Park, Minneapolis	
18^{●}	Gateway Transit Center	104th Street and Nicollet Avenue	Nicollet Mall, Nicollet Avenue	Minneapolis, Richfield, Bloomington	Free rides north on Nicollet Mall.; Night Owl service suspended March 25, 2020 due to COVID-19 pandemic.; Route north of 78th Street planned to be replaced with Metro K Line.
22	Brooklyn Center Transit Center	VA Medical Center station	Lyndale Avenue, 7th–8th Street, Cedar Avenue, 28th Avenue	Brooklyn Center, Minneapolis, Fort Snelling	Cedar Avenue corridor a planned mid-term bus rapid transit implementation between 2030 and 2035, to be paired with the West Broadway corridor of Route 14.
25	N: Northtown Transit Center F: Foley Blvd P&R	Minneapolis Convention Center	Silver Lake Road, Stinson Boulevard, Nicollet Mall	Blaine, Mounds View, Fridley, New Brighton, Saint Anthony, Columbia Heights, Minneapolis	
27	Uptown Transit Station	Aldi Driveway & Wendys	26th–28th Street	Minneapolis	
30	Golden Valley Rd and Xerxes Ave	Westgate station	Golden Valley Road, West Broadway, Broadway	Minneapolis, Saint Paul	
32	Robbinsdale Transit Center	Rosedale Transit Center	Lowry Avenue	Minneapolis, Minneapolis, Saint Anthony, Roseville,	Planned far-term bus rapid transit implementation between 2035 and 2040.
33	Westgate station		University Avenue, 15th Avenue SE, Elm Street, Kasota Avenue	Minneapolis, Saint Paul	Clockwise circulator.; Replaced the Route 3K branch on August 21, 2021.
38	Opus II	C: Minnesota Veterans Home	11th Avenue, Mainstreet, Excelsior Boulevard, Lyndale Avenue South, 38th Street, 46th Avenue, Ford Parkway	Minnetonka, Hopkins, Saint Louis Park, Minneapolis, Saint Paul	Replaced routes 23 and 612 on June 14, 2025.
38	Opus II	H: Ford & Kenneth station	11th Avenue, Mainstreet, Excelsior Boulevard, Lyndale Avenue South, 38th Street, 46th Avenue, Ford Parkway	Minnetonka, Hopkins, Saint Louis Park, Minneapolis, Saint Paul	Replaced routes 23 and 612 on June 14, 2025.
46	Vernon Avenue and Eden Avenue	46th Street station	50th Street, 46th Street	Minneapolis, Edina	
54	Mall of America station	Union Depot	W 7th Street, 5th–6th Street, Maryland Avenue, White Bear Avenue	Maplewood, Saint Paul, Minneapolis-Saint Paul International Airport, Bloomington	Limited-stop service. Stops locally in Downtown Saint Paul and Bloomington.; Mall of America–Union Depot corridor planned to be replaced by Metro J Line.; Union Depot-Maplewood Mall corridor planned to be replaced by Metro Bronze Line.
54	Mall of America station	M: Maplewood Mall Transit Center	W 7th Street, 5th–6th Street, Maryland Avenue, White Bear Avenue	Maplewood, Saint Paul, Minneapolis-Saint Paul International Airport, Bloomington	Limited-stop service. Stops locally in Downtown Saint Paul and Bloomington.; Mall of America–Union Depot corridor planned to be replaced by Metro J Line.; Union Depot-Maplewood Mall corridor planned to be replaced by Metro Bronze Line.
61	7th Street and Nicollet Mall	Smith Avenue Transit Center	Hennepin Avenue, Larpenteur Ave, Arcade Street, 5th–6th Street	Minneapolis, Falcon Heights, Roseville, Maplewood, Saint Paul	
62	Signal Hills Center	Little Canada Transit Center	Smith Avenue, Rice Street	West Saint Paul, Saint Paul, Roseville, Maplewood, Little Canada, Shorewood	Rice Street corridor planned to be replaced by Metro G Line, to be paired with the Robert Street corridor of Route 68.
63	Westgate station	Sun Ray Transit Center	Cretin Avenue, Grand Avenue, East 3rd Street	Saint Paul	Second Better Bus Routes improvement, implemented September 12, 2020.; Formerly High Frequency the entire route, the only route outside of METRO lines to do so.; Planned far-term bus rapid transit implementation between 2035 and 2040.
64^{●}	Maplewood Mall Transit Center	Smith Avenue Transit Center	Payne Avenue, Maryland Avenue, White Bear Avenue	Maplewood, North Saint Paul, Saint Paul	Night Owl service suspended March 25, 2020 due to COVID-19 pandemic.
65	Rosedale Transit Center	Dale Street and Grand Avenue	County Road B, Dale Street	Roseville, Saint Paul	
67	Franklin Avenue station	Union Depot	Franklin Avenue, University Avenue, Minnehaha Avenue, Cedar–Wabasha Street	Minneapolis, Saint Paul	
68	Highway 36th and Rice Street	Camelot Street & California Avenue	Jackson Avenue, Robert Street	Little Canada, Maplewood, Saint Paul, South Saint Paul, Inver Grove Heights	Robert Street corridor planned to be replaced by Metro G Line, to be paired with the Rice Street corridor of Route 62.
72	Hamline Avenue station	Sun Ray Transit Center	Selby Avenue, Burns Avenue	Saint Paul	
71	Little Canada Transit Center	Inver Hills Community College	Westminster Street, Concord Avenue	Little Canada, Maplewood, Saint Paul, South Saint Paul, Inver Grove Heights	
74^{●}	46th Street station	Sun Ray Transit Center	Randolph Avenue, W 7th Street, 5th–6th Street, E 7th St	Minneapolis, Saint Paul, Oakdale, Maplewood	Night Owl service suspended March 25, 2020 due to COVID-19 pandemic.; Planned mid-term bus rapid transit implementation between 2030 and 2035.
75	10th Street station	Alta Avenue and 54th Street	Cedar–Wabasha Street, Stryker Avenue, Robert Street	Saint Paul, West Saint Paul, Inver Grove Heights	
80	Maplewood Mall Transit Center	Sun Ray Transit Center	White Bear Avenue	Maplewood, Saint Paul	To be replaced by Metro H Line and Metro Bronze Line.
83	Rosedale Transit Center	Montreal Circle	County Road B, Lexington Avenue, Hamline Avenue, Lexington Parkway	Roseville, Saint Paul	First began service June 9, 2001 under the Northeast Restructuring plan, but was eliminated after 18 months. The route was revived June 14, 2014 as part of Metro Green Line network improvements.; Uses 25-foot minibuses due to a low clearance railroad bridge.
87	Rosedale Transit Center	Shepard Road and Davern Street	Raymond Avenue, Cleveland Avenue	Roseville, Falcon Heights, University of Minnesota, Saint Paul	
94	Target Field station	Union Depot	6th–7th Street, Interstate 94, 5th–6th Street	Minneapolis, Saint Paul	Express line between Downtown Minneapolis and Downtown Saint Paul with a stop midway at Snelling Avenue.; To be replaced by an extension of Metro Gold Line in 2027.

== Routes 100–199 (Minneapolis–Saint Paul) ==
Routes 100–199 are a mix of services anchored around Minneapolis and the University of Minnesota, often running into the first-ring suburbs and Saint Paul. Routes 110-119 urban local to non-stop service primarily in Minneapolis to the University of Minnesota. Routes 120–124 are free Campus Shuttle services operated by the University of Minnesota. Route 129 extends westbound Interstate 94 buses to the University of Minnesota, often from Saint Paul. Routes 130–199 are urban local to non-stop service to Downtown Minneapolis.

Key
	Metropolitan Council contract route
	Free University of Minnesota Campus Shuttle route
†	Suspended due to COVID-19 and driver shortage

Route	Terminals		Major streets	Cities	Notes
111^{†}	Dinkytown	66th Street and Cedar Avenue	Washington Avenue, Cedar Avenue, Chicago Avenue	University of Minnesota, Minneapolis, Richfield	Peak-direction rush hour service. No weekend, holiday, or break service.; Non-stop service between West Bank station and 24th Street.; Discontinued June 13, 2020 for summer break. Suspended Fall, Spring 2020 and Fall 2021 semesters.
113	Dinkytown	Lyndale Avenue and 56th Street	Washington Avenue, Interstate 94, Lyndale Avenue, Grand Avenue	University of Minnesota, Minneapolis	Peak-direction rush hour service. No weekend, holiday, or break service.; Non-stop service between West Bank station and Franklin Avenue.; Discontinued June 13, 2020 for summer break. Suspended Fall and Spring 2020 semesters.
114	Dinkytown	A: Bryant Avenue and 38th Street	Washington Avenue, Interstate 94, Hennepin Avenue, Lake Street, Excelsior Boulevard	University of Minnesota, Minneapolis, Saint Louis Park	Peak-direction rush hour service. No weekend, holiday, or break service.; Non-stop service between West Bank station and Franklin Avenue.; Discontinued June 13, 2020 for summer break. Suspended Fall and Spring 2020 semesters.
114	Dinkytown	C: Excelsior Boulevard and Quentin Avenue	Washington Avenue, Interstate 94, Hennepin Avenue, Lake Street, Excelsior Boulevard	University of Minnesota, Minneapolis, Saint Louis Park	Peak-direction rush hour service. No weekend, holiday, or break service.; Non-stop service between West Bank station and Franklin Avenue.; Discontinued June 13, 2020 for summer break. Suspended Fall and Spring 2020 semesters.
115^{†}	Dinkytown	Nicollet Avenue and 46th Street	Washington Avenue, Interstate 94, Hennepin Avenue, Grand Avenue	University of Minnesota, Minneapolis	Peak-direction rush hour service. No weekend, holiday, or break service.; Non-stop service between West Bank station and Franklin Avenue.; Discontinued June 13, 2020 for summer break. Suspended Fall, Spring 2020 and Fall 2021 semesters.
118^{†}	Dinkytown	Columbia Heights Transit Center	Washington Avenue, Interstate 35W, Lowry Avenue, Central Avenue	Columbia Heights, Saint Anthony, Minneapolis	Peak-direction rush hour service. No weekend, holiday, or break service.; Non-stop service between The Quarry and Broadway, and between 4th Street and Washington Avenue.; Discontinued June 13, 2020 for summer break. Suspended Fall, Spring 2020 and Fall 2021 semesters.
120 East Bank Circulator	Stadium Village station		5th Street SE, Harvard Street	University of Minnesota	Counterclockwise circulator.; No weekend, holiday, or break service.
121 Campus Connector	West Bank station	Saint Paul Student Center	Washington Avenue, University Avenue, U of M Transitway	University of Minnesota	5–minute frequency during most of the day. 15–minute frequency at most other times.
122 University Avenue Circulator	Humphrey School of Public Affairs		Washington Avenue, 10th Avenue Bridge, University Avenue, Jones/Eddy Hall, Washington Avenue	University of Minnesota	Clockwise circulator.
123 4th Street Circulator	Humphrey School of Public Affairs		University Avenue, TCF Bank Stadium, Fairview-University Hospital, Weisman Art Museum	University of Minnesota	Counterclockwise circulator.; No weekend, holiday, or break service.
124 Saint Paul Circulator	Saint Paul Student Center		Commonwealth Avenue, Cleveland Avenue, Buford Avenue, Como Avenue	University of Minnesota	Clockwise circulator.; No weekend, holiday, or break service.
129^{†}	West Bank station	One-way service	Washington Avenue	University of Minnesota	Shuttle from Huron Boulevard and Interstate 94, extending westbound Routes 94 and 134 trips to the University of Minnesota.; No weekend, holiday, or break service.; Discontinued June 13, 2020 for summer break. Did not return for Fall, Spring 2020 or Fall 2021 semesters. During that time, Routes 94 and 134 did not stop at Huron Boulevard and Interstate 94.; Alternate service provided by Metro Green Line.
133^{†}	Gateway Transit Center	Bloomington Avenue and 46th Street	Marq2 transit corridor, Park-Portland Avenue, Chicago Avenue, 54th Street, Bloomington Avenue, 46th Street	Minneapolis	Peak-direction rush hour service.; Non-stop service between Downtown Minneapolis and 38th Street.; Suspended June 13, 2020.; Alternate service provided by Routes 5 and 14.
134	Ramp A/7th Street Transit Center	Gannon Road and Norfolk Avenue	7th–8th Street, Interstate 94, Cretin Avenue, Cleveland Avenue	Minneapolis, Saint Paul	Peak-direction rush hour service.; Non-stop service between Downtown Minneapolis and Vandalia/Cretin Avenue.; Restored August 16 2025 Part of Network Now.
135^{†}	Gateway Transit Center	Grand Avenue and 48th Street	Marq2 transit corridor, Blaisdall–1st Street, Grand Avenue	Minneapolis	Peak-direction rush hour service.; Non-stop service between Downtown Minneapolis and Lake Street.; Suspended September 12, 2020.; Alternate service provided by Route 18.
141^{†}	1st Avenue and 14th Street	Minneapolis Community and Technical College	8th Avenue, Hennepin Avenue, Johnson Street	New Brighton, Saint Anthony, Minneapolis	Peak-direction rush hour service.; Limited-stop service between Lowry Avenue and Broadway.; Non-stop service between Broadway and Downtown Minneapolis.; Saturday service reduced March 25, 2020 due to the COVID-19 pandemic.; Suspended September 12, 2020.; Alternate service provided by Route 4 and 804.
146^{†}	Gateway Transit Center	A: Eden Avenue and Vernon Avenue	Marq2 transit corridor, Interstate 35W, 46th Street, 50th Street, Vernon Avenue	Minneapolis, Edina	Peak-direction rush hour service.; Non-stop service between Downtown Minneapolis and 46th Street.; Suspended June 13, 2020.; Alternate service provided by Route 46 and Metro Orange Line.
146^{†}	Gateway Transit Center	B: Vernon Avenue and Bren Road	Marq2 transit corridor, Interstate 35W, 46th Street, 50th Street, Vernon Avenue	Minneapolis, Edina	Peak-direction rush hour service.; Non-stop service between Downtown Minneapolis and 46th Street.; Suspended June 13, 2020.; Alternate service provided by Route 46 and Metro Orange Line.
156	Gateway Transit Center	Stevens Ave & Diamond Lake Rd	Marq2 transit corridor, Interstate 35W, 56th Street, 60th Street, Xerxes Ave S	Minneapolis	Peak-direction rush hour service.; Non-stop service between Downtown Minneapolis, Lake Street, and Diamond Lake Road.; Restored on December 6, 2025 as part of Network Now.

== Routes 200–299 (Northeast) ==
Routes 200–299 are routes operating from the northeast suburbs. Routes 200–249 consist of suburban local service, often operated by contracts through the Metropolitan Council. Routes 250–299 are non-stop services to Downtown Minneapolis, Downtown Saint Paul, and the University of Minnesota.

Key
	Metropolitan Council contract route
†	Suspended due to COVID-19 and driver shortage

Route	Terminals		Major streets	Cities	Notes
219	Maplewood Mall Transit Center	Sun Ray Transit Center	Minnesota State Highway 120	Maplewood, Mahtomedi, Oakdale, North Saint Paul, Landfall, Saint Paul	
223	Rosedale Transit Center	Maplewood Mall Transit Center	County Road B2, County Road C, Little Canada Road, County Road D	Roseville, Little Canada, Maplewood	Reopened on December 9, 2024; With Saturday operations 30-1hr
225	Arden Hills Target	Rosedale Transit Center	Snelling Avenue, Fairview Avenue	Arden Hills, Roseville	Non-stop service between County Road E and Lydia Avenue.
227	Arden Hills Target	Rosedale Transit Center	Victoria Street, Woodhill Drive, Hamline Avenue, County Road B2	Arden Hills, Roseville	
250	95th Avenue Park and Ride	Minneapolis Convention Center	Interstate 35W, University Avenue, Hennepin Avenue, Marq2 transit corridor	Blaine, Circle Pines, Shoreview, Mounds View, Minneapolis	Route 250C trips run non-stop between 95th Avenue and University Avenue, with a stop midway at County Road E Park and Ride.; Route 250M trips run non-stop between County Road 32 and University Avenue.
252	95th Avenue Park and Ride	Dinkytown	Interstate 35W, Washington Avenue, University Avenue	Blaine, University of Minnesota	Non-stop service between 95th Avenue and Washington Avenue.
261^{†}	Shoreview Community Center	Minneapolis Convention Center	Interstate 35W, University Avenue, Hennepin Avenue, Marq2 transit corridor	Shoreview, Arden Hills, Roseville, Minneapolis	Suspended June 13, 2020.; Alternate service provided by Route 264.
262^{†}	95th Avenue Park and Ride	Union Depot	Rice Street, Saint Peter–Cedar Avenue	Blaine, Shoreview, Vadnais Heights, Little Canada, Roseville Saint Paul	Limited-stop service between Little Canada Road and Capitol/Rice Street station.; Suspended June 13, 2020.; Alternate service provided by Route 62.
263^{†}	Highway 61 and County Road C Park and Ride	Minneapolis Convention Center	Interstate 35W, University Avenue, Hennepin Avenue, Marq2 transit corridor	Maplewood, Minneapolis	Non-stop service between Highway 61 and County Road C Park and Ride, Highway 36 and Rice Street Park and Ride, and University Avenue.; Suspended June 13, 2020.; Alternate service provided by Route 270.
264	I-35W and County Road E Park and Ride	Minneapolis Convention Center	Interstate 35W, Fairview Avenue, University Avenue, Hennepin Avenue, Marq2 transit corridor	Roseville, Minneapolis	Route 264C trips run non-stop between County Road C and University Avenue.
265^{†}	Highway 96 and White Bear Parkway	Smith Avenue Transit Center	White Bear Avenue, Beam Avenue, Interstate 35W, 5th–6th Street	Centerville, Gem Lake, Maplewood, Saint Paul	Non-stop service between Highway 36 and Downtown Saint Paul.; Suspended June 13, 2020.; Alternate service provided by Route 54.
270	Maplewood Mall Transit Center	Minneapolis Convention Center	Interstate 35W, University Avenue, Hennepin Avenue, Marq2 transit corridor	Maplewood, Minneapolis	Non-stop service between Maplewood Mall Transit Center and University Avenue, with two intermediate stops at Highway 61 and County Road C Park and Ride and Highway 36 and Rice Street Park and Ride.
272^{†}	Maplewood Mall Transit Center	West Bank station	Highway 36, Fairview Avenue, U of M Transitway, Washington Avenue	Maplewood, University of Minnesota	Non-stop service between Maplewood Mall Transit Center, U of M Saint Paul Campus, and Stadium Village station.; The only regular route to use the Transitway other than Route 121 Campus Connector.; Suspended June 13, 2020.; Alternate service provided by Routes 264 and 270.
275	I-35E and County Road 13 Park and Ride	Smith Avenue Transit Center	Interstate 35E, 5th–6th Street	Forest Lake, Columbus, Centerville, Vadnais Heights, Saint Paul	Service to Forest Park Transit Center and Running Aces suspended August 21, 2021.; Non-stop service between County Road 13 and Downtown Saint Paul with a stop midway at I-35E and County Road 13 Park and Ride.
288^{†}	Forest Lake Transit Center	Minneapolis Convention Center	Interstate 35W, University Avenue, Hennepin Avenue, Marq2 transit corridor	Forest Lake, Columbus, Minneapolis	Non-stop service between Scandia Trail, Running Aces, and University Avenue .; Suspended June 13, 2020.; Alternate service provided by Route 250.
294	Saint Croix Valley Rec Center Park & Ride	Smith Avenue Transit Center	Stillwater Boulevard, Interstate 94, 5th–6th Street	Stillwater, Oak Park Heights, Oakdale, Maplewood, Saint Paul	Non-stop service between McKnight Road and Downtown Saint Paul.

== Routes 300–399 (East) ==
Routes 300–399 are routes operating from the east suburbs. Routes 300–349 consist of suburban local service, often operated by contracts through the Metropolitan Council. Routes 350–399 are non-stop services to Downtown Minneapolis and Downtown Saint Paul. Eastbound I-94 buses stop on request at Huron Boulevard, providing access to the University of Minnesota.

Key
	Metropolitan Council contract route
†	Suspended due to COVID-19 and driver shortage

Route	Terminals		Major streets	Cities	Notes
323	Sun Ray Transit Center	Woodbury Theater Park and Ride	McKnight Road, Londin Lane, Lower Afton Road, Valley Creek Drive	Saint Paul, Maplewood, Woodbury	Replaced some Route 63 trips on June 13, 2020.
345	MOA Transit Station	Woodbury Theater Park and Ride	Marie Ave E, Robert St S, American Blvd, I-494	Bloomington, Woodbury	Non-stop service between Newport Transit Station & P&R and Marie Ave E & Robert St S; Non-stop service between Marie Ave E & Robert St S and Msp Terminal 1 Transit Station
350^{†}	Smith Avenue Transit Center	Century Avenue and Lake Road	5th–6th Street, Interstate 94, McKnight Road	Saint Paul, Maplewood	Non-stop service between Sun Ray Transit Center and Downtown Saint Paul.; Suspended June 13, 2020.; Alternative service provided by Route 323.
353	Target Field station	Woodbury Theater Park and Ride	Interstate 94, 5th–6th Street, 6th–7th Street	Minneapolis, Saint Paul, Woodbury	Non-stop service between Woodbury Theater, Downtown Saint Paul, and Downtown Minneapolis.; Eastbound trips make an additional stop on request at Huron Boulevard to connect with Route 129, extending trips to University of Minnesota.
355^{†}	Target Field station	Woodbury Theater Park and Ride	Interstate 94, 5th–6th Street, 6th–7th Street	Minneapolis, Saint Paul, Woodbury	Non-stop service between Woodbury Theater, Downtown Saint Paul, and Downtown Minneapolis.; Eastbound trips make an additional stop on request at Huron Boulevard to connect with Route 129, extending trips to University of Minnesota.; Suspended December 4, 2021.; Alternative service provided by Route 353.
363	Target Field station	Cottage Grove Park and Ride	Interstate 94, 5th–6th Street, 6th–7th Street, Highway 10	Minneapolis, Saint Paul, Cottage Grove	Non-stop service between Cottage Grove Park and Ride, Highway 61 and Lower Afton Park and Ride, Downtown Saint Paul, and Downtown Minneapolis.; Inaugurated September 12, 2020 replacing Routes 361 and 365.
364^{†}	Smith Avenue Transit Center	Hadley Avenue and 80th Street	6th–7th Street, Interstate 94, 4th Avenue, 3rd Street	Saint Paul, Newport, Saint Paul Park, Cottage Grove	Non-stop service between Highway 61 and Lower Afton Park and Ride and Downtown Saint Paul.; Suspended June 13, 2020.
375^{†}	Target Field station	Guardian Angels Park and Ride	6th–7th Street, Interstate 94	Minneapolis, Oakdale	Non-stop service between Guardian Angels Park and Ride and Downtown Minneapolis.; Eastbound trips make an additional stop on request at Huron Boulevard to connect with Route 129, extending trips to University of Minnesota.; Suspended June 13, 2021.; Alternative service provided by Route 353.

== Routes 400–499 (South) ==
Routes 400–499 serve Dakota County and Scott County. Many are operated by Minnesota Valley Transit Authority

Key
	Metropolitan Council contract route
	Minnesota Valley Transit Authority route
†	Suspended due to COVID-19 pandemic and driver shortage

Route	Terminals		Major streets	Cities	Notes
MVTA Connect	Demand-responsive transit		—	Apple Valley, Burnsville, Eagan, Rosemount, Savage	Inaugurated mid-2019 as a pilot demand-responsive transit service in Savage.; Service expanded to Apple Valley and Rosemount October 5, 2020.; Service expanded to Eagan October 18, 2021.
411 Ice Festival	Mall of America station	TCO Stadium	Interstate 494, Vikings Parkway	Bloomington, Eagan	Shuttle service between Mall of America station and the Minnesota Ice Festival at TCO Stadium.; Weekend, winter service only.; Route number not publicly advertised.
412 Buck Hill	Burnsville Transit Station	Buck Hill	Nicollet Avenue, Buck Hill Road	Burnsville	Service connecting Burnsville Transit Station, Burnsville Heart of the City station, and Burnsville Center to Buck Hill.; Weekend, winter service only.; Route number not publicly advertised.
415^{†}	Mall of America station	Mendota Heights Road and Dodd Road	Interstate 494, Mendota Heights Road	Bloomington, Mendota Heights	Non-stop service between 24th Avenue and Pilot Knob Road.; Suspended June 13, 2020.
417^{†}	Union Depot	Mendota Heights Road and Dodd Road	5th–6th Avenue, Smith Avenue, Dodd Road, Marie Avenue, Lexington Avenue, Wagon Wheel Trail	Saint Paul, West Saint Paul, Mendota Heights	Non-stop service between Smith Avenue and Downtown Saint Paul.; Suspended June 13, 2020.
420	Apple Valley station	Rosemount Transit Station; Dakota County Technical College^{†}	157th Street, Galaxie Avenue, 150th Street, 147th Street, 145th Street	Apple Valley, Rosemount	Flex route.; Service to Dakota County Technical College began August 20, 2018.; Truncated from Dakota County Technical College to Rosemount Transit Station due to the COVID-19 pandemic. Flex trips have also been suspended.
421^{†}	Burnsville Transit Station	Savage Park and Ride	Highway 13, Lynn Avenue, Glendale Road, Eagan Drive, Vernon Avenue, 130th Street	Burnsville, Savage	Flex route.; Trips return immediately after reaching Savage Park and Ride.; Suspended due to the COVID-19 pandemic.
425 Orange LINK	Burnsville Transit Station	Burnhaven Drive and Crystal Lake Road	Nicollet Avenue	Burnsville	Inaugurated November 20, 2021, extending Orange Line trips to south Burnsville and Burnsville Center.; Route number not publicly advertised.
426^{†}	Burnsville Transit Station	Southcross Drive and Grand Avenue	Nicollet Avenue	Burnsville	Extends Route 460 trips to south Burnsville.; Suspended due to the COVID-19 pandemic.
436	46th Street station	Thomson Reuters	Highway 55, Highway 62, Pilot Knob Road, Mendota Heights Road, Dodd Road	Minneapolis, Mendota Heights, Eagan	Non-stop service between 46th Street station and Pilot Knob Road.
438^{†}	Cedar Grove station	Thomas Lake Center	Rahn Road, Diffley Road, Cliff Road	Eagan	Trips return immediately after reaching Thomas Lake Center.; Suspended due to the COVID-19 pandemic.
440	Cedar Grove station	Apple Valley station	Highway 77, McAndrews Road, 140th Street, 147th Street	Fort Snelling, Eagan, Apple Valley	Underlying local service for the Metro Red Line east of Cedar Avenue.
440	V: VA Medical Center station	Apple Valley station	Highway 77, McAndrews Road, 140th Street, 147th Street	Fort Snelling, Eagan, Apple Valley	Underlying local service for the Metro Red Line east of Cedar Avenue.
442	Mall of America station	Burnsville Center	Cedar Avenue, Whitney Drive, Garden View Drive, Nicollet Avenue	Bloomington, Eagan, Apple Valley, Burnsville	Non-stop service between Mall of America station, Cedar Grove station, Palomino Hills Park and Ride, and Apple Valley station.; Route 442X trips, inaugurated December 5, 2020, operate non-stop service between Mall of America station and Apple Valley station.
442	Mall of America station	X: Apple Valley station	Cedar Avenue, Whitney Drive, Garden View Drive, Nicollet Avenue	Bloomington, Eagan, Apple Valley, Burnsville	Non-stop service between Mall of America station, Cedar Grove station, Palomino Hills Park and Ride, and Apple Valley station.; Route 442X trips, inaugurated December 5, 2020, operate non-stop service between Mall of America station and Apple Valley station.
443	Eagan Transit Station	Apple Valley station	Interstate 35E, Cedar Avenue	Eagan, Apple Valley	Non-stop service.; Inaugurated December 5, 2020. Discontinued February 20, 2021.
444	Mall of America station	Savage Park and Ride	Highway 77, Highway 13, Traveler's Trail, Burnsville Parkway, Eagan Drive	Bloomington, Eagan, Burnsville, Savage	Non-stop service between 28th Avenue station, Mall of America station, and Cedar Grove station.
444	Mall of America station	Burnsville Center	Highway 77, Highway 13, Traveler's Trail, Burnsville Parkway, Eagan Drive	Bloomington, Eagan, Burnsville, Savage	Non-stop service between 28th Avenue station, Mall of America station, and Cedar Grove station.
445	Cedar Grove station	Thomson Reuters	Cedar Grove Parkway, Silver Bell Road, Blackhawk Road, Yankee Doodle Road, Dodd Road	Eagan	
446	46th Street station	Diffley Road and Braddock Trail	Highway 55, Highway 62, Pilot Knob Road, Lexington Avenue, Yankee Doodle Road	Minneapolis, Mendota Heights, Eagan	Non-stop service between 46th Street station and Pilot Knob Road.
447	Mystic Lake Casino	Apple Valley station	154th Street, Highway 13, County Road 42, Eagan Drive, 143rd Street, 150th Street	Prior Lake, Savage, Burnsville, Apple Valley	Inaugurated February 20, 2021.
452^{†}	Mendota Heights Road & Dodd Road (Mendota Heights)	7th Street Transit Center (Downtown Minneapolis)			
460	Burnsville Transit Center	Gateway Ramp		Burnsville Transit Station	
464	125th & Glenhurst	3rd & Washington		Savage Park & Ride, Burnsville Transit Station	
465	County Rd. 42 and Portland Ave (Burnsville)	4th St. SE & Ridder Arena (University of Minnesota)		Burnsville Transit Station, South Bloomington Transit Center	
467	Kenrick Avenue Park & Ride (Lakeville)	Gateway Ramp (Downtown Minneapolis)	Marquette Avenue (Stop D), 2nd Avenue (Stop E)	Kenrick Ave. Park & Ride	
470	Blackhawk Park & Ride	3rd & Washington		Blackhawk Park & Ride, Eagan Transit Station	
472	Diffley & Thomas Lake	3rd & Washington		Blackhawk Park & Ride, Cedar Grove Transit Station	
475	Apple Valley Transit Station	Washington & Oak (University of Minnesota)		Apple Valley Transit Station, Cedar Grove Transit Station	
476	Rosemount Transit Station	3rd & Washington		Rosemount Transit Station, Palomino Hills Park & Ride	
477	Lakeville Cedar Park & Ride	3rd & Washington		Lakeville Cedar Park & Ride, 157th Street Station, Apple Valley Transit Station, Palomino Hills Park & Ride	
478	145th Street & Diamond Path	Gateway Ramp (Downtown Minneapolis)		Rosemount Transit Station	
479	157th Street & Galaxie Avenue	Gateway Ramp (Downtown Minneapolis)		157th Street Station	
480	Apple Valley Transit Station	St. Paul Union Depot		Apple Valley Transit Station, Palomino Hills Park & Ride, Burnsville Transit Station, Blackhawk Park & Ride, Eagan Transit Station, St. Paul Union Depot	
484	Cliff & Nichols Rd (Eagan)	St. Paul Union Depot		Eagan Transit Station, St. Paul Union Depot	
489	Ames Crossing Rd & Shanahan Way (Eagan)	St. Paul Union Depot		St. Paul Union Depot	
490	Eagle Creek & Main Ave (Prior Lake)	Gateway Ramp (Downtown Minneapolis)		Eagle Creek Park & Ride, Southbridge Crossings Park & Ride	
491	Eagle Creek & Main Ave (Prior Lake)	Gateway Ramp (Downtown Minneapolis)		Eagle Creek Park & Ride, Southbridge Crossings Park & Ride, Cedar Grove Transit Station	
492	Southbridge Crossings Park and Ride	Gateway Ramp (Downtown Minneapolis)		Eagle Creek Park & Ride, Southbridge Crossings Park & Ride, Cedar Grove Transit Station	
493					
495 4FUN	MSP Airport Terminal 1 Transit Station	Mystic Lake Casino	MN-77, MN-13	Mall of America Transit Station, Marschall Road Transit Station	
497/499	Town Square Mall (497) Marschall Road Transit Station (499)	Marschall Road Transit Station (497), Southbridge Crossings Park and Ride (499)	10th Ave W, County Rd 101, Marschall Road (497), Eagle Creek Blvd, Vierling Drive, County Rd 21 (499)	Marschall Road Transit Station, Southbridge Crossings Park and Ride	
498	Southbridge Crossings Park and Ride			Southbridge Crossings Park and Ride	

== Routes 500–599 (South) ==
Routes 500–599 are routes operating from the south suburbs. Routes 500–549 consist of suburban local service, often operated by contracts through the Metropolitan Council. Routes 550–599 are non-stop services to Downtown Minneapolis and the University of Minnesota.

Key
Metropolitan Council contract route

Route	Terminals		Major streets	Cities	Notes
515	Southdale Center	Mall of America station	66th Street, Bloomington Avenue, American Boulevard	Edina, Richfield, Bloomington	
534	Normandale Community College	I-35W & 98th Street station	98th Street, Penn Avenue, American Boulevard, Lyndale Avenue	Bloomington	Inaugurated December 4, 2021 as part of the Orange Line Connecting Bus plan, replacing the western part of Route 539 north of 98th Street.
537	Beard Avenue and Old Shakopee Road	Southdale Center	France Avenue, Collegeview Road, 90th Street	Edina, Bloomington	
538	Southdale Center	Mall of America station	York Avenue, 86th Street	Edina, Bloomington	
539	Normandale Community College	Mall of America station	98th Street, Old Shakopee Road, Old Cedar Avenue	Bloomington	As part of the Orange Line Connecting Bus plan, the line replaced Route 535 branches on 98th Street on December 4, 2021.
540	Normandale Lake Office Park	Mall of America station	77th Street, 76th Street	Bloomington, Richfield	
542	Normandale Lake Office Park	Mall of America station	84th Street, American Boulevard	Bloomington	
546	Normandale Community College	I-35W & 98th Street station	98th Street, Normandale Boulevard, Old Shakopee Road, Penn Avenue	Bloomington	Inaugurated December 4, 2021 as part of the Orange Line Connecting Bus plan, replacing Route 539 branches south of 98th Street and Route 535C branch. on 98th Street.
578	78th Street and Johnson Avenue	Marquette-2nd Avenue and Washington Avenue	York Avenue, Interstate 35W, Marq2 transit corridor	Minneapolis, Edina, Bloomington	Non-stop service between Downtown Minneapolis, I-35W & Lake Street station, I-35W & 46th Street station, and York Avenue.

== Routes 600–699 (Southwest) ==
Routes 600–699 are routes operating from the southwest suburbs, with a notable majority being SouthWest Transit's service area. Routes 600–649 consist of suburban local service. Routes 650–679 are non-stop services to Downtown Minneapolis operated by Metro Transit or contracts through the Metropolitan Council. Routes 680–699 are non-stop services to Downtown Minneapolis and the University of Minnesota operated by SouthWest Transit. Additionally, SW Prime is a demand-responsive transit service operated by SouthWest Transit covering east Carver County and southwest Hennepin County.

Key
	Metropolitan Council contract route
	SouthWest Transit route
†	Suspended due to COVID-19 pandemic and driver shortage

Route	Terminals		Major streets	Cities	Notes
SW Prime	Demand-responsive transit		—	Bloomington, Carver, Chanhassen, Chaska, Eden Prairie, Edina, Minnetonka, Shakopee, Shorewood, Victoria, Minneapolis–Saint Paul International Airport	Inaugurated July 6, 2015 in Eden Prairie as the region's first demand-responsive transit service. Service was expanded to Chaska on August 3, and to Chanhassen and Carver in September. It was the first expansion of local service by SouthWest Transit in nearly a decade, when local buses were reduced in to focus on express buses to Downtown Minneapolis.; On January 11, 2021 service was extended to Shakopee.; On March 15, 2021 service was extended along the Interstate 494 corridor to Mall of America station. Trips to Minneapolis–Saint Paul International Airport must be booked in advance.; Discounted rides to select grocery stores and medical centers in the SW Prime service area. SW Prime also serves select medical centers in Excelsior, Saint Louis Park, and Waconia.
600	East Creek Station	Marquette–2nd Avenue and Washington Avenue	Highway 212, Crosstown, Interstate 35W, Marq2 transit corridor	Chaska, Chanhassen, Eden Prairie, Edina, Minneapolis	Non-stop service between transit centers.; Formerly SW Flex Red Route.
604^{†}	Louisiana Avenue Transit Center	Excelsior Boulevard and Quentin Avenue	Louisiana Avenue, Excelsior Boulevard	Saint Louis Park	Suspended December 4, 2021.; Alternative service on Excelsior Boulevard provided by Route 612.
615	Ridgedale Center	Excelsior Boulevard and Quentin Avenue	Hopkins Crossroad, Mainstreet, Walker Street	Minnetonka, Hopkins, Saint Louis Park	
643^{†}	Cedar Lake Road and Hedberg Drive	6th Street and 10th Avenue	Cedar Lake Road, Louisiana Avenue, Interstate 394, 6th–9th Street	Minnetonka, Saint Louis Park, Golden Valley, Minneapolis	Non-stop service between Park Place Boulevard and Downtown Minneapolis.; Suspended June 13, 2020.; Alternative service on provided by Route 645.
645	A: County Rd 73 P&R	Gateway Transit Center	Shoreline Drive, Wayzata Boulevard, Interstate 394, Marq2 transit corridor	Mound, Spring Park, Minnetonka Beach, Crystal Bay, Wayzata, Minnetonka, Saint Louis Park, Golden Valley, Minneapolis	Non-stop service between Highway 100 and Downtown Minneapolis.; Inaugurated August 19, 2017, replacing Routes 649 and 675 and part of Route 604.
645	C: Wayzata Blvd P&R E: Mound Transit Center	Gateway Transit Center	Shoreline Drive, Wayzata Boulevard, Interstate 394, Marq2 transit corridor	Mound, Spring Park, Minnetonka Beach, Crystal Bay, Wayzata, Minnetonka, Saint Louis Park, Golden Valley, Minneapolis	Non-stop service between Highway 100 and Downtown Minneapolis.; Inaugurated August 19, 2017, replacing Routes 649 and 675 and part of Route 604.
652^{†}	Plymouth Road Park and Ride	Dinkytown	Wayzata Boulevard, Interstate 394, Washington Avenue	Minnetonka, Saint Louis Park, Golden Valley, University of Minnesota	Non-stop service between Hopkins Crossroad, General Mills Boulevard, Louisiana Avenue, and Washington Avenue.; Discontinued June 13, 2020 for summer break. Suspended for Fall 2020 and Spring 2021 semesters. Restored for Fall 2021 semester, suspended again December 4, 2021 for the Spring 2022 semester.
663^{†}	Cedar Lake Road and Hedberg Drive	6th Street and 10th Avenue	Cedar Lake Road, Louisiana Avenue, Interstate 394, 6th–9th Street	Minnetonka, Saint Louis Park, Golden Valley, Minneapolis	Non-stop service between Louisiana Avenue and Downtown Minneapolis.; Suspended August 21, 2021.; Alternative service provided by Routes 645 and 973.
664^{†}	Opus II	1st Street and Hennepin Avenue	11th Avenue, Excelsior Boulevard, Highway 100, Interstate 394, Marq2 transit corridor	Minnetonka, Hopkins, Saint Louis Park, Minneapolis	Non-stop service between Highway 100 and Downtown Minneapolis.; Suspended December 4, 2021.; Alternative service provided by Route 612.
667	B: Amherst	Washington Avenue and Hennepin Avenue	County Road 101, Highway 7, Minnetonka Boulevard, Highway 100, Interstate 394, Marq2 transit corridor	Minnetonka, Hopkins, Saint Louis Park, Minneapolis	Non-stop service between Highway 100 and Downtown Minneapolis.
667	H: County Road 101 and 62nd Street	Washington Avenue and Hennepin Avenue	County Road 101, Highway 7, Minnetonka Boulevard, Highway 100, Interstate 394, Marq2 transit corridor	Minnetonka, Hopkins, Saint Louis Park, Minneapolis	Non-stop service between Highway 100 and Downtown Minneapolis.
668^{†}	Cambridge Street & Blake Road	Washington Avenue and Hennepin Avenue	Texas Avenue, West Lake Street, Minnetonka Boulevard, Highway 100, Interstate 394, Marq2 transit corridor	Saint Louis Park, Minneapolis	Non-stop service between Highway 100 and Downtown Minneapolis.; Suspended June 13, 2020.; Alternative service provided by Routes 17 and 667.
670^{†}	Excelsior Park and Ride	2nd Street SE and 2nd Avenue SE	Excelsior Boulevard, Mainstreet, Highway 169, Interstate 394, Marq2 transit corridor, Central Avenue	Excelsior, Minnetonka, Hopkins, Minneapolis	Non-stop service between Highway 169 and Downtown Minneapolis.; Suspended December 4, 2021.
671^{†}	Navarre Center Park and Ride	2nd Street SE and 2nd Avenue S	County Road 19, Minnetonka Boulevard, Mainstreet, Highway 169, Interstate 394, Marq2 transit corridor, Central Avenue	Orono, Excelsior, Minnetonka, Minneapolis	Non-stop service between Highway 169 and Downtown Minneapolis.; Suspended June 13, 2020.; Alternative service provided by Routes 670 and 673.
672^{†}	A: Wayzata Park and Ride	Washington Avenue and Hennepin Avenue	Budd Avenue, County Road 51, Wayzata Boulevard, Interstate 394, Marq2 transit corridor	Maple Plain, Orono, Long Lake, Wayzata, Minnetonka, Saint Louis Park, Minneapolis	Non-stop service between Plymouth Road, Louisiana Avenue Transit Center, and Downtown Minneapolis.; Suspended June 13, 2020.; Alternative service provided by Route 645.
672^{†}	B/C: Maple Plain Park and Ride	Washington Avenue and Hennepin Avenue	Budd Avenue, County Road 51, Wayzata Boulevard, Interstate 394, Marq2 transit corridor	Maple Plain, Orono, Long Lake, Wayzata, Minnetonka, Saint Louis Park, Minneapolis	Non-stop service between Plymouth Road, Louisiana Avenue Transit Center, and Downtown Minneapolis.; Suspended June 13, 2020.; Alternative service provided by Route 645.
673	Louisiana Avenue Transit Center	2nd Avenue and 2nd Street	Cedar Lake Road, Greenbrier Road, County Road 73, Interstate 394, Marq2 transit corridor	Minnetonka, Saint Louis Park, Minneapolis	Non-stop service between Plymouth Road, Louisiana Avenue Transit Center, and Downtown Minneapolis.; Suspended June 13, 2020 and reinstated August 21, 2021.
677^{†}	Three Points Boulevard and Canary Lane	1st Street and 1st Avenue	Shoreline Drive, County Road 15, Highway 212, Interstate 394, Marq2 transit corridor	Spring Park, Mound, Orono, Wayzata, Minneapolis	Non-stop service between Highway 212, Wayzata Park and Ride, and Downtown Minneapolis.; Suspended June 13, 2020.
679^{†}	Crescent Ridge Office Park	2nd Street and 1st Avenue	County Road 73, Interstate 394, Washington Avenue	Minnetonka, Saint Louis Park, Minneapolis	Non-stop service between County Road 73 Park and Ride and Ramp A/7th Street Transit Center.; Suspended June 13, 2020.
682	SouthWest Station, Southwest Village, East Creek Station; Wooddale Church^{†}	State Fair Transit Center	Highway 212, Interstate 394, Interstate 35W, U of M Transitway	Chaska, Chanhassen, Eden Prairie, Minneapolis, Minnesota State Fair	Seasonal express service during the Minnesota State Fair.; Branded as Twins Express when operating to Minnesota Twins games.; May be used for other special event service.
682	SouthWest Station, Southwest Village, East Creek Station; Wooddale Church^{†}	B: Target Field	Highway 212, Interstate 394, Interstate 35W, U of M Transitway	Chaska, Chanhassen, Eden Prairie, Minneapolis, Minnesota State Fair	Seasonal express service during the Minnesota State Fair.; Branded as Twins Express when operating to Minnesota Twins games.; May be used for other special event service.
684^{†}	East Creek Park and Ride	Gateway Transit Center	Highway 212, Crosstown Highway, Interstate 35W, Marq2 transit corridor	Chaska, Chanhassen, Eden Prairie, Edina, Minneapolis	Non-stop service between SouthWest Station, Southdale Center, and I-35W & 46th Street station.; Suspended March 23, 2020.
690	SouthWest Station	Washington Avenue and Hennepin Avenue	Interstate 494, Interstate 394, Marq2 transit corridor	Eden Prairie, Minneapolis,	Non-stop service between SouthWest Station and Downtown Minneapolis.
691^{†}	Walnut Street Park and Ride	Gateway Transit Center	Highway 212, Interstate 494, Interstate 394, Marq2 transit corridor	Chaska, Chanhassen, Eden Prairie, Minneapolis	Non-stop between SouthWest Station and Downtown Minneapolis.; Suspended March 23, 2020.
692^{†}	Chanhassen Station	Washington Avenue and Hennepin Avenue	Interstate 494, Interstate 394, Marq2 transit corridor	Chanhassen, Minneapolis	Non-stop between Chanhassen Station and Downtown Minneapolis.; Suspended March 23, 2020.
695	East Creek Station	East Bank station	Highway 212, Crosstown Highway, Interstate 35W, Washington Avenue	Chaska, Chanhassen, Eden Prairie, Minneapolis, University of Minnesota	Non-stop between SouthWest Station and I-35W & Lake Street station.
697^{†}	Carver Station	Washington Avenue and Hennepin Avenue	Highway 212, Interstate 494, Interstate 394, Marq2 transit corridor	Chaska, Minneapolis	Non-stop between East Creek Station and Downtown Minneapolis.; Suspended March 23, 2020.
698	East Creek Station	Washington Avenue and Hennepin Avenue	Highway 212, Interstate 494, Interstate 394, Marq2 transit corridor, Washington Avenue	Chaska, Chanhassen, Eden Prairie, Minneapolis	Non-stop between SouthWest Station and Downtown Minneapolis.
698	C: Carver Station	C: Washington Avenue and Hennepin Avenue	Highway 212, Interstate 494, Interstate 394, Marq2 transit corridor, Washington Avenue	Chaska, Chanhassen, Eden Prairie, Minneapolis	Non-stop between SouthWest Station and Downtown Minneapolis.
698	T: Carver Station	T: East Bank station	Highway 212, Interstate 494, Interstate 394, Marq2 transit corridor, Washington Avenue	Chaska, Chanhassen, Eden Prairie, Minneapolis	Non-stop between SouthWest Station and Downtown Minneapolis.
698	U: East Creek Station	U: East Bank station	Highway 212, Interstate 494, Interstate 394, Marq2 transit corridor, Washington Avenue	Chaska, Chanhassen, Eden Prairie, Minneapolis	Non-stop between SouthWest Station and Downtown Minneapolis.
699	East Creek Station	Washington Avenue and Hennepin Avenue	Highway 212, Interstate 494, Interstate 394, Marq2 transit corridor	Chaska, Chanhassen, Minneapolis	Non-stop between Southwest Village and Downtown Minneapolis.
699	C: Carver Station	Washington Avenue and Hennepin Avenue	Highway 212, Interstate 494, Interstate 394, Marq2 transit corridor	Chaska, Chanhassen, Minneapolis	Non-stop between Southwest Village and Downtown Minneapolis.

== Routes 700–799 ==
Routes 700–799 are suburban routes serving NW Hennepin County.

Key
	Metropolitan Council contract route
	Maple Grove Transit route
	Plymouth Metrolink route
	SouthWest Transit route
X-X-X	Express route
X-X-X	Limited stop route

Route	Terminals		Major streets	Transit stations	Areas, landmarks
705	Starlite Transit Center	Louisiana Avenue Transit Center		Louisiana Avenue Transit Center, Starlite Transit Center	
716	Brooklyn & Welcome	Robbinsdale Transit Center		Robbinsdale Transit Center	
717	Brooklyn Center Transit Center	51st Street and Nathan Lane		Robbinsdale Transit Center, Brooklyn Center Transit Center	
721	Hennepin College	Brooklyn Center Transit Center, Downtown Minneapolis		Brooklyn Center Transit Center	
722	69th & Humboldt	Brooklyn Center Transit Center		Brooklyn Center Transit Center	
723	Starlite Transit Center	Brooklyn Center Transit Center		Brooklyn Center Transit Center	
724	Target Northern Campus, Starlite Transit Center	Brooklyn Center Transit Center, Downtown Minneapolis		Brooklyn Center Transit Center, Starlite Transit Center	
725	Starlite Transit Center	Northtown Transit Center		Starlite Transit Center Northtown Transit Center	
740	Station 73	Annapolis & CR 9		Station 73	
741	Station 73	Annapolis & CR 9		Station 73	
742	Marquette & Washington	Prudential			
747	Marquette & Washington	Annapolis & CR 9		Station 73	
755	Downtown Minneapolis	Brooklyn Park	Marquette Ave and 2nd Ave in Downtown. Hwy 55 to suburbs. Winnetka Ave, Boone Ave, and Golden Valley Rd in suburbs.		Honeywell Facility, New Hope and Golden Valley city centers
756^{†}	Downtown Minneapolis	Brooklyn Park	Marquette Ave and 2nd Ave in Downtown. I-394 to suburbs. Louisiana Ave, General Mills Blvd, Winnetka Ave, Boone Ave, and Golden Valley Rd in suburbs.		Louisiana Ave Transit Center, General Mills Park & Ride
758^{†}	63rd & Forest	5th & 4th			
760	Brooklyn Blvd P&R & 65th Ave N	Marquette & 11th			
761^{†}	Yates & 80th	Marquette & 11th		Brooklyn Center Transit Center	
762^{†}	2nd & 10th	Brooklyn Transit Center		Brooklyn Center Transit Center	
763	France & 73rd	Marquette & 11th			
764	Downtown Minneapolis	Starlite Transit Center	6th St and 7th St in Downtown. 42nd Ave, Winnetka Ave and Broadway in Crystal, New Hope and Brooklyn Park.	Starlite Transit center	Downtown Minneapolis
765	Leamington Ramp	Target North Campus			
766	Leamington Ramp	Dayton & French Lake			
767^{†}	65th & Magda	Marquette & 11th			
768					
771	CR 24 & Medina	Station 73		Station 73	
772	Plymouth & 37th	2nd & Washington		Station 73	
774	Plymouth & 37th	2nd & Washington		Station 73	
776	Vicksburg & Schmidt Lake	2nd & Washington			
777	Peony & Old Rockbird	2nd & Washington		Station 73	
780	Weaver Lake & Fish Lake	9th & Lasalle			
781	CR 30 & I-94	9th & Lasalle		Maple Grove Transit Station	
782	3rd & 10th	Central & 1st			
783	CR 101 & 80th	9th & Lasalle			
785	Maple Grove Parkway TS	9th & Lasalle			
788	Quinwood & 62nd Place	9th & Lasalle			
790	Quinwood & Bass Lake	2nd & Washington			
791	Deerwood & Bass Lake	Four Seasons Mall			
793	Quinwood & Bass Lake	2nd & Washington			
795	Quinwood & Bass Lake	2nd & Washington			

== Routes 800–899 (North) ==
Routes 800–899 are routes operating from the north suburbs. Routes 800–849 consist of suburban local service, often operated by contracts through the Metropolitan Council. Routes 850–886 are non-stop services to Downtown Minneapolis and Downtown Saint Paul. Route 887 is the Northstar Link and Route 888 is the Northstar Line.

Key
	Metropolitan Council contract route
	Metro Bus route
†	Suspended due to COVID-19 and driver shortage

Route	Terminals		Major streets	Cities	Notes
801	C: Columbia Heights Transit Center	Rosedale Transit Center	44th Avenue, 40th Avenue, 38th Avenue, Cleveland Avenue	Brooklyn Center, Columbia Heights, Minneapolis, Saint Anthony, New Brighton, Roseville	Non-stop service between I-694 and Brooklyn Center Transit Center.
801	D: Brooklyn Center Transit Center	Rosedale Transit Center	44th Avenue, 40th Avenue, 38th Avenue, Cleveland Avenue	Brooklyn Center, Columbia Heights, Minneapolis, Saint Anthony, New Brighton, Roseville	Non-stop service between I-694 and Brooklyn Center Transit Center.
802	Northtown Transit Center	Anoka Technical College	Coon Rapids Blvd Springbrook Dr	Inaugurated June 13 , 2026 replacing the 827A/F branch and 850A/N branch.	
804	Silver Lake Village	County Road H Park and Ride	Old Highway 8	Saint Anthony, New Brighton	Inaugurated August 21, 2021 replacing the Route 4G branch.
805	Downtown Anoka	Northtown Transit Center	University Avenue	Anoka, Coon Rapids, Downtown Blaine	Connects with Northstar at Anoka station and Coon Rapids–Riverdale station.
824	Northtown Transit Center	Minneapolis Convention Center	University Avenue, Marq2 transit corridor	Blaine, Spring Lake Park, Columbia Heights, Hilltop, Minneapolis	Limited-stop service between 40th Avenue and Hennepin Avenue.
825^{†}	Northtown Transit Center	Minneapolis Convention Center	Silver Lake Road, New Brighton Boulevard, Hennepin Avenue, Marq2 transit corridor	Blaine, Mounds View, Fridley, Columbia Heights, New Brighton, Saint Anthony, Minneapolis	Limited-stop service between New Brighton Bouelvard and University Avenue.; Suspended June 13, 2020.; Alternative service provided by Route 25.
827	Northtown Transit Center	Leamington Ramp & Upper Level - Layover	East River Road, Marshall St, Marq2 transit corridor	Blaine, Minneapolis Minnesota	Starting Dec. 6, 2025 Route 827 local bus route replaced Route 852 transition from Northstar commuter rail expanded bus service.
831^{†}	Northtown Transit Center	Jefferson Street and 117th Avenue	University Avenue, Polk Street	Blaine	Trips return immediately after reaching Jefferson Street and 117th Avenue.
850	A: Anoka Technical College	Minneapolis Convention Center	Coon Rapids Boulevard, Interstate 94, Marq2 transit corridor	Anoka, Coon Rapids, Minneapolis	Non-stop service between Coon Rapids–Foley Boulevard station and Downtown Minneapolis.
850	F: Coon Rapids–Foley Boulevard station	Minneapolis Convention Center	Coon Rapids Boulevard, Interstate 94, Marq2 transit corridor	Anoka, Coon Rapids, Minneapolis	Non-stop service between Coon Rapids–Foley Boulevard station and Downtown Minneapolis.
850	N: Coon Rapids–Riverdale station	Minneapolis Convention Center	Coon Rapids Boulevard, Interstate 94, Marq2 transit corridor	Anoka, Coon Rapids, Minneapolis	Non-stop service between Coon Rapids–Foley Boulevard station and Downtown Minneapolis.
854^{†}	C: Paul Parkway Park and Ride	Minneapolis Convention Center	University Avenue, Interstate 94, | rowspan=3|Marq2 transit corridor	Coon Rapids, Blaine, Spring Lake Park, Fridley, Minneapolis	Limited-stop service between Northtown Transit Center and Interstate 694.; Non-stop service between Interstate 694 and Downtown Minneapolis.; Suspended June 13, 2020.
854^{†}	H: Coon Rapids–Foley Boulevard station	Minneapolis Convention Center	University Avenue, Interstate 94, | rowspan=3|Marq2 transit corridor	Coon Rapids, Blaine, Spring Lake Park, Fridley, Minneapolis	Limited-stop service between Northtown Transit Center and Interstate 694.; Non-stop service between Interstate 694 and Downtown Minneapolis.; Suspended June 13, 2020.
854^{†}	N: Northtown Transit Center	Minneapolis Convention Center	University Avenue, Interstate 94, | rowspan=3|Marq2 transit corridor	Coon Rapids, Blaine, Spring Lake Park, Fridley, Minneapolis	Limited-stop service between Northtown Transit Center and Interstate 694.; Non-stop service between Interstate 694 and Downtown Minneapolis.; Suspended June 13, 2020.
860	Coon Rapids–Riverdale station	Smith Avenue Transit Center	Highway 10, Interstate 35E, 5th–6th Street	Coon Rapids, Blaine, Mounds View, Saint Paul	Non-stop service between Coon Rapids–Riverdale station, Northtown Transit Center, County Road H Park and Ride, and Downtown Saint Paul.; Restored June 14, 2025.
865^{†}	Paul Parkway Park and Ride	Minneapolis Convention Center	Highway 65, Interstate 94, Marq2 transit corridor	Blaine, Minneapolis	Non-stop service between Paul Parkway Park and Ride and Downtown Minneapolis.; Suspended September 12, 2020.; Alternative service provided by Routes 250 and 850.
882	Big Lake Park and Ride	Minneapolis Convention Center	Highway 47, Interstate 94, Marq2 transit corridor	NorthStar replacement bus service began Jan. 5, 2026	
887 Northstar Link	Metro Bus Transit Center, SCSU	Big Lake Station	Highway 10	Saint Cloud, Becker, Big Lake	
888 Northstar Line	Big Lake Station	Target Field Station	Wayzata Subdivision, Midway Subdivision, Staples Subdivision	Big Lake, Elk River, Ramsey, Anoka, Fridey, Coon Rapids, Minneapolis	

== Routes 900–999 (Special) ==
Routes 900–999 are special services. Routes 900–929 are Metro lines, but numbers are not publicly advertised. Route 960 is seasonal State Fair service. Special or temporary routes occupy the 900s series.

Key
●	Night Owl route
†	Suspended due to COVID-19 and driver shortage

Route	Terminals		Major streets	Cities	Notes
901 Blue Line	Target Field station	Mall of America station	5th Street, Hiawatha Avenue	Minneapolis, Fort Snelling, Minneapolis-Saint Paul International Airport, Bloomington	
902 Green Line	Target Field station	Union Depot	5th Street, Washington Avenue, University Avenue, Cedar Street	Minneapolis, University of Minnesota, Saint Paul	
903 Red Line	Mall of America station	Apple Valley Transit Station	Cedar Avenue	Bloomington, Eagan, Minnesota, Apple Valley	
904 Orange Line	Marquette-2nd Avenue & 3rd Street	Burnsville Heart of the City	Marq2 transit corridor, Interstate 35W	Minneapolis, Richfield, Bloomington, Burnsville	
905 Gold Line	Smith Avenue Transit Center	Woodlane Drive	5th–6th Streets, Busway adjacent to Interstate 94	Saint Paul, Maplewood, Landfall, Oakdale, Woodbury	
906^{●} Blue Line Airport Shuttle	Terminal 1–Lindbergh station	Terminal 2–Humphrey station	Airport tunnel	Minneapolis–Saint Paul International Airport	Night Owl service providing 24/7 free inter-terminal service.; Some trips extend to Fort Snelling station.; During Highway 5 reconstruction April–October 2020, some trips extended to 28th Avenue station to connect with Route 54.
921 A Line	Rosedale Transit Center	46th Street Station	Snelling Avenue, Ford Parkway, 46th Street	Minneapolis, Saint Paul, Falcon Heights, Lauderdale, Roseville	
923 C Line	Brooklyn Center Transit Center	7th-8th Street & Park Station	Brooklyn Boulevard, Penn Ave, Olson Memorial Highway, 7th–8th Street	Brooklyn Center, Minneapolis	
960^{†}	Minneapolis Convention Center	State Fair Transit Center	Nicollet Mall, Washington Avenue, U of M Transitway	Minneapolis, University of Minnesota, Minnesota State Fair	Seasonal only during the Minnesota State Fair with service every 20 minutes.; Non-stop service between Stadium Village station and State Fair Transit Center.; Due to additional buses detoured to Nicollet Mall, the Route 960 was rerouted onto 3rd–4th Street for the 2019 season.; Suspended for the 2020 season, which was cancelled due to the COVID-19 pandemic. Did not return for the 2021 season due to driver shortages.
991 Blue Line Bus	—	—	6th–7th Street, Cedar Avenue, Hiawatha Avenue, Minnehaha Avenue, 34th Avenue	Minneapolis, Fort Snelling, Minneapolis-Saint Paul International Airport, Bloomington	Used for planned rail replacement bus service.; Route number not publicly advertised.
992 Green Line Night Bus^{●†}	Target Field station	Union Depot	6th–7th Street, Washington Avenue, University Avenue, Cedar–Minnesota Street	Minneapolis, University of Minnesota, Saint Paul	Night Owl bus service replacing Green Line trips between 2 am and 4 am. Inaugurated August 17, 2019.; Also used for planned rail replacement bus service, known as just Green Line Bus.; Route number not publicly advertised.; Suspended March 25, 2020 due to COVID-19 pandemic.

== Former Routes ==
Route	Terminals		Major streets	Transit stations	Areas, landmarks	When discontinued				
1						Traveled on Stinson Avenue. Transferred to restructured Route 25 on September 16, 2000, while the routing of Route 25 on New Brighton had frequency reduced due to lower ridership. Service on 33rd east of Silver Lake Rd. and on Old Hwy. 88 was discontinued. Route 1G was renumbered Route 31.				
3 (first use)						Traveled on Broadway. Discontinued in 1993 or 1994. Route was restored on March 8, 2014, as Route 30, but on a slightly different routing.				
3 (St. Paul)						Renumbered Route 63 on September 16, 2000.				
4 (St. Paul)						Renamed Route 84 on June 9, 2001, with streamlined service between Hamline University and Rosedale. Service on Pascal and Arlington east of Snelling and north of Como (Routes 4B, 4D and 4E) was replaced by new Routes 3, 65, 83 and 87. Service on Energy Park Dr. and on Cleveland and Raymond (Route 4U) was replaced by new Routes 3 and 87.				
5 (St. Paul)						Service north of St. Paul was replaced by then-new Route 3 and service south of St. Paul was replaced by then-new Route 75 on June 9, 2001.				
6 (portion)						Section east of Dinkytown was replaced by then-new Route 3 on 15th Avenue SE and Como, then-new Route 87 on Cleveland, then-new Route 61 on Larpenteur, and then-new Route 83 on Hamline, with Route 6 being rerouted to end at Oak & Washington.				
7 (St. Paul)						Replaced by then-new Route 67 on June 9, 2001, with service to Midway Shopping Center replaced by then-new Route 84.				
8	Franklin Avenue Station	University Ave. and Emerald St.	Franklin Ave.	Franklin Avenue Station		Discontinued on June 14, 2014; replaced by extended Route 67.				
8 (St. Paul)						Replaced by then-new Route 68 on June 9, 2001, with service along Westminster and McMenemy replaced by then-new Route 71.				
9 (St. Paul)						Replaced by then-new Route 69 on June 9, 2001, with service along service on White Bear Avenue replaced by then-new Route 80 and service in North St. Paul and Maplewood replaced by then-new Route 64.				
11 (first use)						Traveled on Lowry Avenue. Merged into Route 32 in 1997. Route 11 was reused on another route on December 4, 2004, replacing the northern half of Route 18 and the southern half of Route 9 (which was later extended over former Route 24).				
11 (St. Paul)						Replaced by then-new Route 71 on June 9, 2001, with service to Maplewood Mall removed as it duplicated Route 223.				
12 (St. Paul)						Replaced by then-new Route 61 on Arlington, Victoria, Hoyt and Larpenteur, then-new Route 62 on Rice Street to Arlington (then-new Route 3 also covered the section south of Maryland), then-new Route 69 on E. 7th and Minnehaha and to Rolling Hills, then-new Route 83 to Rosedale on Hamline, and then-new Route 219 to Oakdale and Globe College on June 9, 2001.				
13						University of Minnesota Campus Shuttles. Discontinued by 1998.				
14 (St. Paul)						Replaced by then-new Route 64 on June 9, 2001.				
15						Renumbered Route 515 on September 8, 2003; the route was shifted off 28th Ave and 54th Street west of 34th Ave, was also shifted off of 86th Street, and was also shifted off of Bloomington and 12th Ave (Route 515 was shifted back onto these streets by May 2005), and was truncated so that it no longer serves Fairview-Southdale Hospital.				
15 (St. Paul)						Replaced by then-new Routes 61, 64, 218, and 265 on June 9, 2001.				
17 (St. Paul)						Renumbered Route 65 on September 16, 2000.				
19 (St. Paul)						Replaced by Route 72S by 1998.				
20 (first use)						Discontinued on June 26, 2004; replaced by an extension of Route 7 north of Downtown and by then-new Route 24 south of Downtown. The then-new Route 23C branch replaced service to the Vets home.				
20	Ramp B/5th Street Transit Center	Southbound: 5th Ave S and 7th St Northbound: 9th St S and Chicago Ave	10th St S (southbound), 9th St S (northbound)	Target Field Station	University of St. Thomas, Target, AT&T Tower, and Hennepin County Medical Center	Discontinued on December 1, 2018, due to low ridership.				
20 (St. Paul)						Replaced by then-new Route 80 on June 9, 2001.				
22 (first use)						Discontinued on June 26, 2004; replaced by then-new route 24 north of Downtown and the then-new Route 14E branch and then-new Route 27 south of Downtown. Restored on September 10, 2005, when the northern section of Route 24 was renumbered Route 22.	21	Lake Street & France Avenue	Lake Street & 28th Avenue Union Depot	Replaced by METRO B Line on June 14, 2025.
22 (St. Paul)						Renumbered Route 76 on June 9, 2001.				
23	Minnesota Veterans Home Ford & Kenneth station	Uptown Transit Station				Merged with 612 into 38 on June 14, 2025.				
24 (first use)						Split into Routes 824 and 854 on September 16, 2000.				
24	7th Street Garage	46th Street Station	8th St (southbound), 9th St (northbound), Park Ave (northbound), Portland Ave (southbound), E Franklin Ave, Minnehaha Ave, E 25th St, 36th Ave S, E 34th St, 42nd Ave S, E 42nd St	7th Street Garage, Franklin Avenue Station, 46th Street Station	Downtown Minneapolis, Elliot Park, Phillips, Seward, Longfellow	Merged into Route 9 on September 12, 2009.				
26						Renumbered Route 766 on September 29, 2001.				
27 (first use)						Local service was split into Routes 827 and 852, Foley express service was renumbered Route 850, and Route 27R (Anoka Express) was renumbered Route 851 on September 16, 2000.				
28						Traveled on Xerxes Avenue. Became part of Route 6 (which was extended and had a new branch added) on December 4, 2004. Route 28B service on 44th St. was eliminated, Route 28E service on York Ave. was replaced by restructured Route 538, and Route 28KL service was replaced by restructured Route 6 and restructured Route 540.				
29 (first use)						Renumbered Route 829 on September 16, 2000.				
29 (St. Paul)						Renumbered Route 79 on June 9, 2001.				
29	Xerxes Ave. N and Plymouth Ave. N	Lyndale Ave. N and Broadway Ave. N	Plymouth Ave. N, Fremont Ave N (eastbound), Emerson Ave. N (westbound), Broadway Ave. N			Discontinued on June 2, 2007, when Route 7 weekend service on these streets was restored.				
30 (first use)						Discontinued by 1998.				
31B						Renumbered Route 425 on September 18, 1999.				
31F						Renumbered Route 431 in May/June 1999.				
31						Merged into Route 61 on September 14, 2002.				
33 (first use)						Renumbered Route 260 on September 16, 2000, with shuttle service north of Rosedale replaced by then-new Routes 226 and 227.				
34						Traveled from along Glenwood Avenue/Harold Avenue west of downtown Minneapolis. Discontinued by 1998 and replaced by new branch of Route 9 and additional stops on Route 75.				
35A						Renumbered Route 135 on June 9, 2001.				
35B/35D						Route 35B was renumbered Route 146 and Route 35D was renumbered Route 148 on September 14, 2002.				
35C/35F						Route 35C was renumbered Route 156 and Route 35F was renumbered Route 566 on June 9, 2001.				
35E						Discontinued on December 9, 2000.				
35G/35Z						Route 35G was renumbered Route 553 and Route 35Z was renumbered Route 552 on June 9, 2001.				
35H/35J/35K						Renumbered Route 578 on December 4, 2004.				
35L/35S/35U						Route 35L and Route 35S eliminated and Route 35U replaced by restructured Route 553 and then-new Route 554 on December 4, 2004.				
35M/35N/35T/35Y						Route 35M was renumbered Route 460M, Route 35N was renumbered Route 460N, Route 35T was renumbered Route 460, and Route 35Y was renumbered Route 460U, with Route 425 replacing the local portion of Route 35Y on October 1, 2001.				
35R/35V						Route 35R was renumbered Route 490 and Route 35V was renumbered Route 464 on October 1, 2001.				
35A/35B (St. Paul)						Replaced by then-new Routes 217 and 265 on June 9, 2001.				
35C (St. Paul)						Replaced by then-new Route 265 on June 9, 2001.				
35N (St. Paul)						Renumbered Route 860 on September 16, 2000.				
36						Renumbered Route 270 on June 9, 2001. Route 36 service to White Bear Lake was replaced by then-new Route 265.				
37W						Route 37W was renumbered Route 460W (later Route 427) on October 1, 2001.				
38						Renumbered Route 250 on September 16, 2000.				
39 (first use)						Ran from VA Hospital via Airport, Control Data, and Burnsville to Apple Valley. Replaced by revisions to Routes 15 and 42 by 1998.				
40 (first use)						Discontinued by 1998.				
40 (Arts and Eats Shuttle)						Discontinued in September 2000.				
41						Replaced by then-new Route 541 west of I-35W and then-new Route 547 east of I-35W on December 8, 2001.				
42B/42N						Renumbered Route 444 in May/June 1999.				
42E/42S						Renumbered Routes 420 and 421 in 1998.				
42A/42B (Sites and Bites Shuttle)						Discontinued in September 2000.				
43						Ran on Saturdays only. Discontinued on September 8, 2003. Service alternatives are Routes 2, 5, 14, 19, 21 and 22 (which have changed since then; now Route 46 covers some areas).				
44C						Replaced by then-new Route 594 on December 8, 2001.				
44E						Discontinued on September 29, 2001.				
45						Renumbered Route 760 on June 9, 2001.				
46 (first use)						Went from St. Paul to Apple Valley via Robert, Hwy. 110, Hwy. 149, Hwy. 3, and Rosemount.				
46 (second use)						Route 46G/46H was replaced by then-new Route 556, and Route 46N was replaced by then-new Route 576 north of I-494 and by then-new Route 586 south of I-494 on December 8, 2001.				
47						The section south of 82nd Street was replaced by then-new Route 547, the section in Richfield was replaced by then-new Route 556, and Route 47D was replaced by then-new Route 597 on December 8, 2001.				
48A/48B/48E/48G						Route 48A was renumbered Route 480A, Route 48B was renumbered Route 480B, Route 48E was renumbered Route 484, and Route 48G was renumbered Route 480 on October 1, 2001.				
48T						Discontinued in May/June 1999.				
49						Renumbered Route 70 on June 9, 2001.				
50 (first use)						Replaced by Route 94Y by 1997.				
50	5th Street Garage (Downtown Minneapolis)	4th St. and Minnesota St. (Downtown St. Paul)	University Av	5th Street Garage		Discontinued on June 14, 2014; replaced by the Green Line. Route 50U branch renamed Route 129.				
51 (first use)						Route 51N renumbered Route 74, Route 51S renumbered Route 75, and Route 51W renumbered Route 75W.				
51						Discontinued by 1998.				
52A/B/C/F/K/L/M/R/T/U						Route 52A renumbered Route 111, Route 52B renumbered Route 152, Route 52C renumbered Route 113, Route 52F was with former Route 194 to become Route 144, Route 52K was renumbered Route 712, Route 52L was renumbered Route 114A, Route 52M was renumbered Route 652, Route 52R was renumbered Route 272, Route 52T was renumbered Route 114C, and Route 52U was renumbered Route 115 on September 7, 2004:				
52E						Discontinued on September 7, 1999, due to low ridership.				
52H/52P						Discontinued on December 22, 2002.				
53A/53E/53K/53S						Renumbered Route 682 in 1999.				
53B/53C/53D						Split into Routes 683 and 684 in 1999.				
53M						Renumbered Route 681 in 1999.				
53R						Renumbered Route 685 on December 12, 1998.				
54D/54S						Renumbered Route 590 in 1999. Note that current Route 54 was also active at that time.				
55 (first use)						Route 55A was renumbered Route 755A, Route 55B/55F was Route renumbered 756B, Route 55C was renumbered Route 755C, and Route 55D was renumbered Route 756D on December 8, 2001.				
55	Target Field Station	Mall of America				Discontinued on May 18, 2013; now the Blue Line.				
56 (first use)						Stopped at 7 Corners. Merged into Route 55 by 1998.				
56	Lindbergh Terminal Station	Humphrey Terminal Station			Light Rail - MAC Shuttle (owl service only)	Discontinued by May 15, 2013.				
57						Ran from Minneapolis to Apple Valley via the Minnesota Zoo. Replaced by Route 77T by 1998.				
58						Renumbered Route 758 on June 9, 2001.				
59						Renumbered Route 649 on March 31, 2001.				
60						Operated to the State Fair on Nicollet Avenue from Lake Street and then through free lots at the University of Minnesota. Renumbered Route 960.				
61 (first use)						Renumbered Route 361 on September 22, 1997, with local service replaced by new Routes 320, 321, 322, 323, and 324.				
62 (first use)						Discontinued by 1998; replaced by new Route 54.				
62 (second use)						Became part of an extension of Route 1 (this section now covered by Route 25) and a new branch and extension of Route 9 in 1998.				
63 (first use)						Renumbered Route 663 on September 18, 1999.				
64 (first use)						Renumbered Route 664 on December 9, 2000.				
65 (first use)						Discontinued by 1998 and replaced by a branch of Route 70, later Route 665.				
66						Replaced by then-new Routes 604 and 605 on September 16, 2000.				
67 (first use)						Renumbered Routes 667 and 668 on December 9, 2000.				
68 (first use)						Renumbered Route 568 on September 18, 1999.				
69 (first use)						Discontinued by 1998.				
69						Discontinued on June 26, 2004; replaced by then-new Route 74 east of Downtown and by restructured Route 54 and then-new Routes 46 and 55/155 west of Downtown.				
70 (first use)						Route 70F was renumbered Route 665 and Route 70C/70G was renumbered Route 670 on September 16, 2000.				
71 (first use)						Renumbered Routes 639, 641, and 671 on December 9, 2000.				
72M/72S/72W						Route 72M was redundant with Route 180 north of Mall of America and was renumbered Route 449 south of Mall of America, Route 72S was renumbered Route 439, and Route 72W was renumbered Route 489 on December 8, 2001.				
72U						Discontinued in May/June 1999.				
73 (first use)						Circulated the university's East and West Bank campuses. Replaced by extension of Route 2 into Dinkytown and increased service on Route 6.				
73						Renumbered Route 673 in May/June 1999.				
74 (first use)						Split into Routes 672 and 674 in May/June 1999.				
75 (first use)						Split into then-new Routes 675, 676, and 677 on December 9, 2000.				
76 (first use)						Discontinued by 1998.				
76						Discontinued on September 10, 2005.				
77A/77S/77T						Route 77A/77T was replaced by then-new Route 477, Route 77S was renumbered Route 477R, and then-new Route 432 replacing the local circulator section of Route 77A on December 8, 2001.				
77B/77C/77W						Route 77B/77C/77W was renumbered Route 472/472C/472W on December 8, 2001.				
77D/77E/77H						Route 77D/77E/77H was renumbered Route 470/470E/470H on December 8, 2001.				
77G/77L						Route 77G was renumbered Route 445 and Route 77L was renumbered Route 446 on September 18, 1999.				
77J						Route 77J was split into Routes 428 and 429 (which had different routes and schedules than Route 77J did) on September 18, 1999.				
77K						Route 77K was renumbered Route 442 on September 18, 1999.				
77P/77V						Route 77P/77V was renumbered Route 476P/476V on December 8, 2001.				
77T/77Z						Route 77T was renumbered Route 440 and Route 77Z was renumbered Route 441 on September 18, 1999. Saturday service was discontinued.				
78 (first use)						Discontinued by 1997.				
78S						Created in June 1997. Renumbered Route 678 on June 9, 2001.				
79 (first use)						Discontinued by 1998.				
79						Discontinued on March 15, 2003, due to low ridership. Alternate service available on Route 68.				
80 (first use)						Renumbered Route 180 on December 9, 2000.				
80 (St. Paul)						Replaced by then-new Routes 245 and 246 in 1999.				
81						Renumbered Route 721 on December 9, 2000.				
81 (St. Paul)						Split into Routes 270 and 271 in 1998.				
82						Renumbered Route 722 on December 9, 2000.				
82 (St. Paul)						Renumbered Route 851 in 1998.				
83 (first use)						Renumbered Route 723 on December 9, 2000.				
83 (second use)						Discontinued on September 14, 2002. Alternate service available on routes 3, 16, 21, 61, 65, 67 and 84. Route was restored on June 14, 2014, but on a different routing north of Larpenteur.				
83 (St. Paul)						Split into Routes 210 and 211 in 1998.				
84 (first use)						Renumbered Route 724 on December 9, 2000.				
84 (St. Paul)						Split into Routes 212 and 213 in 1998.				
85						Split into Routes 764 and 765 on December 9, 2000.				
86						Crystal Express. Merged into Route 85 by 1998.				
87 (first use)						Split into Routes 587 and 588 on December 9, 2000.				
88						Renumbered Route 538 on March 16, 2002.				
89						Renumbered Route 539 on March 16, 2002.				
90A/90B						Discontinued in 1998.				
91A/91B						Route 91A was renumbered Route 770 and Route 91B was renumbered Route 771 on September 16, 2000.				
91C/91D/91L						Route 91C was renumbered Route 772, Route 91D was renumbered Route 773, and Route 91L was renumbered Route 774 on September 16, 2000.				
92A/92C/92R						Route 92A was renumbered Route 740, Route 92C was renumbered Route 741, and Route 92R was renumbered Route 743 on September 16, 2000.				
92D						Route 92D was renumbered Route 742 on September 16, 2000.				
93A/93B/93C/93L/93S						Route 93A was renumbered Route 790, Route 93B was renumbered Route 791, Route 93C was renumbered Route 792, and Route 93L/93S was renumbered Route 793 on September 16, 2000.				
94B/94C						Discontinued on June 14, 2014; Route 94C stopped at I-94 & Snelling as well as all current Route 94D stops, and Route 94B stopped there as well as all current Route 94F stops and in addition, stopped in the Capitol area; at the same time, the new Route 94F was created.				
94E						Discontinued on September 8, 2003. Alternative service available of Routes 22, 94G/K (now 761/762), and 763				
94F						Renumbered Route 763 on September 16, 2000.				
94G/94K						Route 94K was renumbered Route 761 and Route 94G was renumbered Route 762 on September 11, 2004. Routes 94B/94C/94D were simply renamed Route 94, but the Route 94B and 94C branches were eliminated when the Green Line opened.				
94H						Renumbered Route 134 on December 9, 2000.				
94J						Renumbered Route 194 on December 9, 2000.				
94L						Renumbered Route 191 on December 9, 2000.				
94M/94W/94Y						Replaced by then-new Routes 301, 302, 303, 350 and 351 on March 24, 1997.				
94N/94P/94R/94T						Route 94N was renumbered Route 780, Route 94P was renumbered Route 781, Route 94R was renumbered Route 782, and Route 94T was renumbered Route 783 on December 8, 2001.				
94S						Renumbered Route 294 in 1998.				
95B/95C						Route 95B was renumbered Route 788 and Route 95C was renumbered Route 789 on December 8, 2001.				
95E						Replaced by then-new Route 3 on June 9, 2001.				
95M/95U						Renumbered Route 452 on December 9, 2000.				
101						Replaced by new Routes 224 and 226, on September 16, 2000.				
102						Replaced by new Route 227 on September 16, 2000.				
103						Replaced by then-new Route 223 on September 16, 2000.				
104						Replaced by then-new Route 65 on September 16, 2000. No service on Co. Rd. B east of Dale				
105						Replaced by then-new Routes 222, 225, and 801 on September 16, 2000.				
115	University of Minnesota; Washington Avenue and Oak Street	South Minneapolis; 36th Street and Lyndale Avenue	Washington Avenue, Interstate 94, Lyndale Avenue, 24th Street, Hennepin Avenue, 36th Street	Operated evenings only. Southbound service only. Routing combined that of Routes 113 and 114. Limited Stop service.		Replaced with increased afternoon and evening service on Routes 113 and 114 in May 2018.				
144	Downtown Minneapolis; 7th Street Garage	Saint Paul; Highland Park; Snelling Avenue and Edgecumbe Road	6th Street (outbound), 7th Street (inbound), Washington Avenue, Huron Boulevard, Interstate 94, Snelling Avenue, Ford Parkway, Fairview Avenue, Montreal Avenue, Snelling Avenue			Limited Stop service; Peak hours only; Alternate service provided at other times by Route 84. Discontinued on June 14, 2014; replaced by increased service on Route 84 and the then-new Green Line.				
148						Discontinued on December 4, 2004, and replaced by then-new Route 133.				
152	University of Minnesota	Southdale Transit Center	Southdale Transit Center			Discontinued on December 4, 2010. Replaced by revised Route 11.				
155						Discontinued on December 4, 2004, and replaced by then-new trains on Route 55.				
180						Discontinued on December 4, 2004, and replaced by Route 55 rail service to Mall of America.				
191						Replaced by then-new Route 53 on June 26, 2004.				
194						Combined with former Route 52F to form Route 144 on September 7, 2004.				
210						Replaced by then-new Routes 62 and 262 on June 9, 2001.				
211						Discontinued on September 16, 2000.				
212						Replaced by then-new Route 62 on June 9, 2001.				
213						Replaced by then-new Route 262 on June 9, 2001.				
217						Consolidated into Route 265 in December 2001.				
218						Discontinued on September 13, 2003. Service north of Maplewood Mall was replaced by Route 270.				
222						Renumbered Route 87 on June 9, 2001. Service on Roselawn and Eustis was eliminated and service on Como Ave. was replaced by then-new Route 3.				
224						Discontinued on September 10, 2005. Alternate service is available on Route 225.				
226						Discontinued on September 10, 2005. Alternate service is available on Route 225.				
234						Replaced by then-new Routes 218 and 219 on June 9, 2001.				
234						Discontinued on September 10, 2005; replaced by revised Route 219				
241	Interstate 35W & Industrial Blvd.	Downtown Minneapolis				Temporary Route. Discontinued on March 7, 2009.				
245						Discontinued on September 13, 2003. Replaced by Dial-A-Ride service operated by HSI.				
246	St. Croix Valley Dial-a-ride					Discontinued on March 16, 2002. Later restored, but discontinued on May 30, 2009. Replaced by a Maple Grove Transit's Dial-a-Ride.				
255	Wells Fargo in Shoreview	Smith Avenue Ramp (Downtown St. Paul)				Discontinued on May 30, 2009, due to low ridership.				
260	Rosedale Transit Center (260 & 260C), Roseville Skating Center P&R (260B)	Leamington Ramp (Downtown Minneapolis)		Rosedale Transit Center		Discontinued on December 8, 2012. Replaced by additional service on Routes 261 and 264 and by then-new Route 263.				
270/271						Replaced by then-new Route 275 on June 9, 2001.				
285	Forest Lake Transit Center	Downtown St. Paul	Interstate 35E, Interstate 35	Forest Lake Transit Center		Discontinued and replaced by an extended Route 275 on December 15, 2014.				
300						Woodbury Dial-a-Ride. Discontinued.				
301						Discontinued on September 10, 2005.				
302						Discontinued on September 10, 2005.				
303						Discontinued on September 10, 2005.				
304						Discontinued on September 10, 2005.				
320						Discontinued in June 2005.				
321						Discontinued on September 13, 2003. Alternate service was available on Route 320.				
322						Discontinued on September 10, 2005.				
323						Discontinued on September 13, 2003.				
324						Renumbered Route 364 on September 11, 2004.				
351	Smith Avenue Transit Center	Woodbury Theater Park and Ride	6th–7th Street, Interstate 94	Smith Avenue, Woodbury Theater	Downtown Saint Paul, Woodbury	Discontinued March 22, 2025; replaced by the METRO Gold Line.; Non-stop service between Woodbury Theater and Downtown Saint Paul.; Eastbound trips made an additional stop on request at Huron Boulevard to connect with Route 129, extending trips to University of Minnesota.				
352						Discontinued on September 13, 2003.				
361						Discontinued September 12, 2020. Replaced by Route 363.				
362						Discontinued on September 10, 2005; replaced by revised Route 361B.				
363						Discontinued on June 7, 2003, due to low ridership. Alternate service was available on Routes 94BCD and 353 with a connection to Route 361 in downtown St. Paul.				
364 (first use)						Discontinued on September 14, 2002, due to low ridership. Alternate service available on Route 324, which was renumbered to new Route 364 on September 11, 2004.				
365						Discontinued September 12, 2020. Replaced by Route 363.				
422	Burnsville Transit Center	Heart of the City Park & Ride		Burnsville Transit Station		Discontinued on September 12, 2009.				
423						Offered summer weekday service Dial-a-Ride service for Prior Lake and Savage residents until August 31, 2001.				
424						Renumbered Route 425A on October 1, 2001.				
425						Discontinued on March 10, 2007. Alternative service available on Route 442/444 and by transfer to Route 540/542 at Mall of America.				
426						Discontinued on May 18, 2000.				
427						Discontinued on March 10, 2007. Alternative service available on Route 444.				
428/429						Merged into Route 440 on June 10, 2000.				
431						Renumbered Route 425E on June 8, 2002.				
432						Discontinued on September 10, 2005; alternative service already on other routes.				
437	Cedar Grove Transit Station	Eagan Transit Station		Cedar Grove Transit Station, Eagan Transit Station		Discontinued on November 18, 2018. Some service replaced by revised Route 445, but some areas lost service completely.				
439						Discontinued on December 4, 2004, and replaced by revised Route 489 and then-new Routes 436 and 448.				
441	Mall of America	Apple Valley Transit Station		Mall of America, Apple Valley Transit Station	Ran on Saturdays only.	Discontinued on June 22, 2013, and replaced by realigned Route 440 and the then-new Red Line.				
446 (first use)						Renumbered Route 445A on October 1, 2001.				
449						Discontinued on December 4, 2004, and replaced by then-new Route 436.				
452	Mendota Heights Road & Dodd Road (Mendota Heights)	7th Street Transit Center (Downtown Minneapolis)								
466						Discontinued on March 10, 2007.				
471						Discontinued on December 4, 2004, and replaced by then-new Route 446.				
477 (first use)						Discontinued on September 29, 2001.				
494						Discontinued on April 1, 2016.				
495	Town Square Mall	Burnsville Transit Station				Discontinued in August 2007.				
496	Target & Kohl's (Shakopee) (Loop route)			Marschall Road Transit Station		Replaced by new routes 497 and 499 on May 16, 2016.				
497 (first use)	Shakopee	Burnsville				Discontinued in January 2007.				
501						Replaced by then-new Routes 681–685 in 1999.				
502						Replaced by then-new Routes 681–685 in 1999.				
503						Replaced by then-new Routes 681–685 in 1999.				
504						Replaced by then-new Routes 681–685 in 1999.				
505						Discontinued in 1998.				
530	Lindbergh Terminal Transit Center Gate 1/2	Humphrey Terminal Main Entrance/Ramp			24 Hour Airport Shuttle	Discontinued December 2007.				
531	Lindbergh Terminal Transit Center Gate 1/2	70th St. and 34th Ave. (Lot C Shelter)			24 Hour Airport Shuttle	Discontinued December 2007.				
535	Gateway Transit Center	A: Knox & 76th Street station	Marq2 transit corridor, Interstate I-35W, 76th Street, Penn Avenue, American Boulevard, Lyndale Avenue, 98th Street		Minneapolis, Richfield, Bloomington	Discontinued December 4, 2021. Replaced by the Metro Orange Line.				
535	Gateway Transit Center	B: I-35W & 98th Street station	Marq2 transit corridor, Interstate I-35W, 76th Street, Penn Avenue, American Boulevard, Lyndale Avenue, 98th Street		Minneapolis, Richfield, Bloomington	Discontinued December 4, 2021. Replaced by the Metro Orange Line.				
535	Gateway Transit Center	C/D: Normandale Community College	Marq2 transit corridor, Interstate I-35W, 76th Street, Penn Avenue, American Boulevard, Lyndale Avenue, 98th Street		Minneapolis, Richfield, Bloomington	Discontinued December 4, 2021. Replaced by the Metro Orange Line.				
541						Discontinued on September 13, 2003, and replaced by extensions of Routes 566 and 576.				
547						Discontinued on September 13, 2003, and replaced by Route 597C.				
551						Discontinued on September 14, 2002, and replaced by four extended Route 556 trips.				
556						Discontinued on December 4, 2004, and replaced by restructured Route 539 and then-new Routes 535, 557, and 589.				
557				Bloomington South Transit Station		Discontinued on March 7, 2009. Replaced by Route 558L branch, Route 576A branch and Route 576B branch. Route 576 routing renamed Route 576C branch.				
565	Target North Campus	Knox Avenue P&R				Short-lived route that started in spring 2014 and was discontinued on March 7, 2015, due to low ridership.				
566						Discontinued on December 4, 2004, and replaced by restructured Route 576 and then-new Route 542.				
568										
576	2nd Ave/Washington Ave.	I-35W/66th St.				Discontinued on December 4, 2010, and replaced by expanded service on Routes 535 and 558.				
586						Discontinued on December 4, 2004, and replaced by restructured Route 576 and then-new Routes 539 and 589.				
588 (first use)						Discontinued on December 3, 2005, and replaced by the then-new Route 146C branch.				
590						Renumbered Route 540 on December 9, 2000.				
594						Discontinued on September 13, 2003, and replaced by Route 597B.				
597	Marquette-2nd Avenue and Washington Avenue	B: Normandale Community College	Marq2 transit corridor, Interstate 35W, Old Shakopee Road		Minneapolis, Bloomington	Discontinued December 4, 2021. Replaced by Route 547 and Metro Orange Line.				
597	Marquette-2nd Avenue and Washington Avenue	E: 106th Street and Bloomington Ferry	Marq2 transit corridor, Interstate 35W, Old Shakopee Road		Minneapolis, Bloomington	Discontinued December 4, 2021. Replaced by Route 547 and Metro Orange Line.				
601	East Creek Station	Southdale Center	Chestnut Street, Lyman Boulevard, Audubon Road, Highway 5, Highway 212, Shady Oak Road, Crosstown		Chaska, Chanhassen, Eden Prairie, Edina	Non-stop between City West and France Avenue.; Formerly SW Flex Blue Route.; Discontinued on May 20, 2019; replaced by SW Prime demand responsive transit service.				
602	East Creek Station	Normandale Community College	Highway 212, Interstate 494, 76th Street, Lyndale Avenue, 98th Street		Eden Prairie, Bloomington	Non-stop between East Creek Station, Southwest Village, SouthWest Station, and Normandale Boulevard.; Formerly SW Flex Shuttle.; Replaced by SW Prime demand responsive transit service.				
603	Eden Prairie Circulator			SouthWest Station		Replaced by the then-new Route 690E branch on December 12, 2011.				
603	Washington Avenue and Hennepin Avenue	SouthWest Station	Marq2 transit corridor, Interstate 394, Highway 100, Crosstown, Shady Oak Road, Highway 212		Minneapolis, Eden Prairie	Non-stop between Downtown Minneapolis, City West, and SouthWest Station.; Reverse commute service leaving from Minneapolis only.; Replaced by Route 600 and SW Prime demand responsive transit service.				
605						Discontinued on September 10, 2005; replaced by then-new Route 615.				
607						Discontinued on September 14, 2002. Alternate rush-hour service to parts of this area available on Routes 9 and 17.				
609						Discontinued on September 14, 2002, and replaced by restructured Route 605.				
612 (first use)						Discontinued on September 10, 2005; replaced by Minnetonka Dial-A-Ride.				
612 (second use)	Main & 11th	Minnetonka Heights		Ridgedale		Discontinued on September 12, 2009.				
612 (third use)	Opus II	Uptown Transit Station				Merged with 23 into 38 on June 14, 2025.				
614						Discontinued on September 10, 2005; replaced by then-new Route 615.				
618						Discontinued on September 13, 2003.				
631	Market P&R or SouthWest Station	Southdale		SouthWest Station, Southdale Transit Station		Discontinued on February 2, 2009; replaced by then-new Route 684.				
632	Eden Prairie Wal-Mart	Edendale			Tuesdays Only	Discontinued in late 2015.				
633						Chaska Commuter Connection. Discontinued on December 4, 2006.				
634	Heart of the City P&R	Virtual Radiologic		Best Buy, Express Scripts, Supervalue Eastview, Cigna, Lifetouch, Supervalue Valley View, Ingenix		Golden Triangle Express. Discontinued on July 15, 2011.				
635						Eden Prairie Circulator. Discontinued on September 8, 2015.				
636				SouthWest Station		Discontinued on February 2, 2009.				
636						Eden Prairie Circulator. Discontinued on September 8, 2015.				
638					Shady Oak Road	Shady Oak Shuttle. Discontinued on July 16, 2009.				
638						Short-lived route which ran from Shakopee to Eden Prairie. Started in December 2016 and was discontinued on March 6, 2017, and replaced by PRIME.				
639						Discontinued and replaced by improved Route 612 service on March 16, 2002.				
640						Saturday Mall of America Service. Discontinued on June 3, 2006.				
641						Discontinued on September 10, 2005; replaced by Shorewood Dial-A-Ride.				
649	4th & 7th	Louisiana Ave Transit Center	Louisiana Ave. Transit Center			Discontinued on August 19, 2017; replaced by then-new Route 645 and restructured Routes 9 and 25.				
660						Discontinued on September 14, 2002. Alternate service available on Routes 12 and 17.				
661						Discontinued on September 10, 2005.				
662						Discontinued on September 13, 2003.				
665	Gateway Ramp	Smetana				Discontinued on August 24, 2013, and replaced by rerouting of Routes 664 and 670 as part of the West Suburban service restructuring.				
669						Discontinued on December 9, 2000, and replaced by then-new Route 649.				
674	Nicollet Mall	Maple Place				Consolidated with Route 672 on December 7, 2019.				
675	Wayzata P&R or Mound	Gateway Ramp (Downtown Minneapolis)	Louisiana Ave. Transit Center, Plymouth Road Transit Center, Spring Park Transit Center, Mound Transit Center			Renumbered Route 645 and restructured on August 19, 2017.				
676						Discontinued on September 13, 2003.				
678	Dial-a-Ride			Mound Transit Center (Dial-a-ride transfer from 675/677)		Discontinued on May 30, 2009. Replaced by Maple Grove Transit's Dial-a-Ride.				
680	Anderson Lakes Pkwy	Downtown Minneapolis		Preserve Village P&R, Shady Oak P&R		Replaced by Route 690P branch of Route 690 between May 18 and May 28, 2014.				
681				SouthWest Station		Discontinued on February 2, 2009; replaced by new Route 684.				
682						Discontinued in December 2005.				
683						Discontinued in December 2005.				
683				Southdale Hospital		Discontinued on February 2, 2009; replaced by new Route 684.				
684						Discontinued in December 2005.				
684	Gateway Ramp	East Creek-Chaska		Southdale Transit Center, Shady Oak P&R SouthWest Station		Discontinued on August 21, 2017. Replaced by new Flex Routes 601 (Local) and 602 (Express).				
685	Dell Rd & Hwy 62	Oak & Wash		SouthWest Station (A trips)		Discontinued on May 14, 2011. Replaced by restructured Routes 690 and 691 and then-new Route 692				
686 (first use)						Discontinued in December 2005.				
687						Discontinued in December 2005.				
687						Ran from Eden Prairie to Target N' Cam. Discontinued on March 6, 2017, and replaced by PRIME.				
688						Discontinued in December 2005.				
689						Discontinued in December 2005.				
689						Discontinued in December 2005.				
690C/690H/690P	690C: Chanhassen TS H: Hennepin Village P: Anderson Lakes & Mitchell Rd	Downtown Minneapolis			Discontinued on May 20, 2019; replaced by express service and PRIME.					
690F	F: Chanhassen TS via SouthWest Village	Downtown Minneapolis			Discontinued on September 3, 2019.					
691	Stoughton Ave & Audubon Rd	Downtown Minneapolis				Discontinued on May 20, 2019; replaced by express service and PRIME.				
692						Discontinued in December 2005.				
692	Dell Rd & Hwy 62	Oak & Washington				Discontinued on December 14, 2009. Replaced by additional service on Routes 690 and 691.				
692	Chanhassen Transit Station	Downtown Minneapolis				Discontinued on May 20, 2019; replaced by express service and PRIME.				
693						Discontinued in December 2005.				
693	Gateway Ramp	SouthWest Station			Saturday Only	Last day of operation was May 23, 2009.				
694	Del Rd & Hwy 62	Oak & Wash		SouthWest Station (A trips)		Discontinued on December 14, 2009. Replaced by additional service on Routes 690 and 691.				
694	East Creek Station	Best Buy, Normandale CC, Southdale TC				Discontinued on August 21, 2017. Replaced by new Flex Route 600.				
695						Discontinued in December 2005.				
696						Discontinued in December 2005.				
696				SouthWest Station		Discontinued on December 14, 2009. Replaced by additional service on Routes 690 and 691.				
697						Discontinued in December 2005.				
697				SouthWest Station		Discontinued on December 14, 2009. Replaced by additional service on Routes 690 and 691.				
699/699C/699D/699E/699V	699: Carver Station 699C: Pioneer Tr & McKnight Rd 699D: Stoughton Ave & Audubon Rd 699E: East Creek 699V: Clover Field Park and Ride	Downtown Minneapolis				Routes 699 and 699C (which was rerouted to Chanhassen Station) just got cut back while the other three branches were discontinued on May 20, 2019; replaced by express service and PRIME.				
712						Discontinued on September 6, 2005.				
715		Robbinsdale Transit Center		Robbinsdale Transit Center, Starlite Transit Center		Discontinued on May 30, 2009. Alternate weekday service covered by Routes 705, 717 and 755. Alternate Saturday service covered by Route 716.				
719						Temporary route replacing part of Route 19 from June 9, 2001, to December 8, 2001, due to bridge reconstruction.				
720	Zinnia & Maple King	Starlite Transit Center		Starlite Transit Center, Maple Grove Transit Station		Discontinued on September 12, 2009, due to low ridership.				
743	Marquette & Washington	Annapolis & CR 9		Station 73		Discontinued on April 17, 2010.				
759						Temporary route replacing part of Route 19 from June 9, 2001, to December 8, 2001, due to bridge reconstruction.				
765						Discontinued on December 3, 2005, and replaced by extended Route 758.				
768						Discontinued on September 14, 2002.				
770						Discontinued in September 2006.				
773	Plymouth & 37th	2nd & Washington		Station 73		Merged into Route 777 on April 17, 2010.				
784 (first use)						Discontinued on December 8, 2003.				
784	Walmart Park & Ride	9th & Lasalle				Discontinued on December 4, 2010, and replaced by then-new Route 785.				
786	Elk River-Maple Grove Circulator					Discontinued on May 30, 2009. Replaced by Maple Grove Transit's Dial-a-Ride.				
787	Flex Route-Maple Grove Transit Center	University Of Minnesota			Discontinued on December 7, 2019.					
789 (first use)				Maple Grove Transit Station		Discontinued by September 2003.				
789				Maple Grove Transit Station		Discontinued on December 1, 2007.				
792	28th & Kilmer	Four Seasons Mall				Discontinued on April 17, 2010.				
810	Fridley Station (circulator)					Discontinued on May 18, 2013.				
811	Riverdale Crossing	Coon Rapids				Discontinued on March 3, 2012.				
817						Discontinued between April and June 2004.				
818						Discontinued on December 3, 2005, and replaced by extended Route 805.				
827						Discontinued on December 3, 2005, and replaced by revised Route 852.				
829	Northdale Blvd. and Ilex St.	Downtown Minneapolis				Replaced by then-new Route 59 on March 20, 2010.				
842						Discontinued on March 15, 2003, due to low ridership.				
851 (first use)						Renumbered Route 860 on September 16, 2000, the same day the next 851 was created.				
851	Riverdale Crossing	Downtown Minneapolis				Replaced by Routes 811 and 888 on December 12, 2009.				
856	Ramsey Town Center P&R	5th Street Garage (Downtown Minneapolis)				Discontinued when Ramsey Station on Northstar Route 888 opened on November 14, 2012.				
