= West Bank station =

Metro station in Minneapolis, Minnesota

West Bank
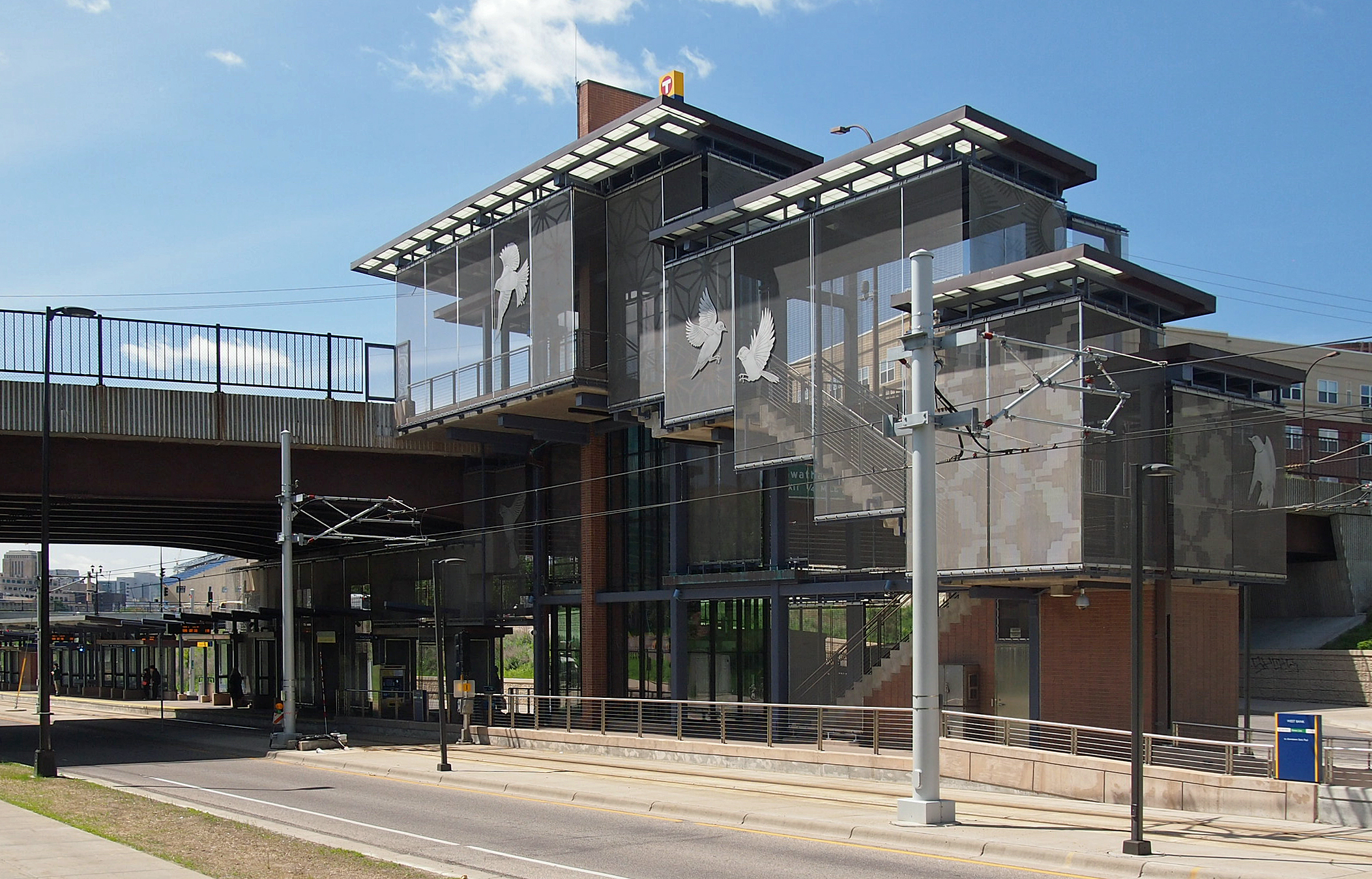
- West Bank station from the southeast

General information
- Location: 275 Cedar Avenue; Minneapolis, Minnesota
- Coordinates: 44°58′19″N 93°14′49″W
- Owner: Metro Transit
- Platforms: 1 island platform
- Tracks: 2
- Connections: Metro Transit: 2, 3, 7, 22

Construction
- Structure type: At-grade
- Cycle facilities: Racks, Nice Ride stations
- Accessible: Yes

History
- Opened: June 14, 2014

Passengers
- 2025: 1,468 daily ▲3.7%
- Rank: 9 out of 37

Services
| Preceding station | Metro | Following station |
|---|---|---|
| U.S. Bank Stadium toward Target Field | Green Line | East Bank toward Saint Paul Union Depot |
Location

West Bank station is a light rail station along the Metro Green Line in Minneapolis. It serves the West Bank campus of the University of Minnesota, as well as the Cedar-Riverside neighborhood.

Construction in the vicinity began in 2010, and the station opened with the rest of the line in 2014. It is the westernmost station only served by Green Line trains. The next station to the west, U.S. Bank Stadium Station, has been served by the Blue Line since it opened in 2004.

== Location ==
The station is located west of the Washington Avenue Bridge, extending from Cedar Avenue to slightly east of 19th Avenue.

The station is located on Hennepin County Road 122, an unsigned continuation of Washington Avenue SE. Washington Avenue originally ran straight east-west across the Mississippi River when the first bridge for the road was built in 1884. However, the current bridge was constructed in the 1960s at a slight angle to the southwest, causing Washington Avenue to become discontinuous.

Washington Avenue S itself is located a block to the north, and has its eastern terminus on the West Bank at 19th Avenue, leading into the University of Minnesota Law School.

== Design and layout ==
Because the station is in a sunken corridor, stairways and elevators were installed at Cedar Avenue and 19th Avenue to reach the platform. This is unlike other Green Line stations, which do not feature vertical pedestrian movement. The station was designed with an island platform to minimize the number of stairs and elevators needed.

== Art ==
Art for the station was created by artist Nancy Blum. The work is titled (Im)migration.

Made out of stainless steel that clings to the facade of the structure, the work features migratory birds that use the Mississippi as a migratory flyway. Wire mesh that clads the station structure contain patterns that reflect the immigrant communities that have established themselves in the West Bank area, both through the Cedar-Riverside neighborhood and the University of Minnesota.

== Services and connections ==
The station is served by METRO Green Line. To connect to buses, users have to either go up a level to Cedar Avenue or cross the street to an access ramp on Washington Avenue.

From Cedar Avenue, the station is served by routes 7 and 22. From Washington Avenue, the station is served by routes 2 and 3.
