= Northtown Mall (Blaine, Minnesota) =

Shopping mall in Blaine, Minnesota

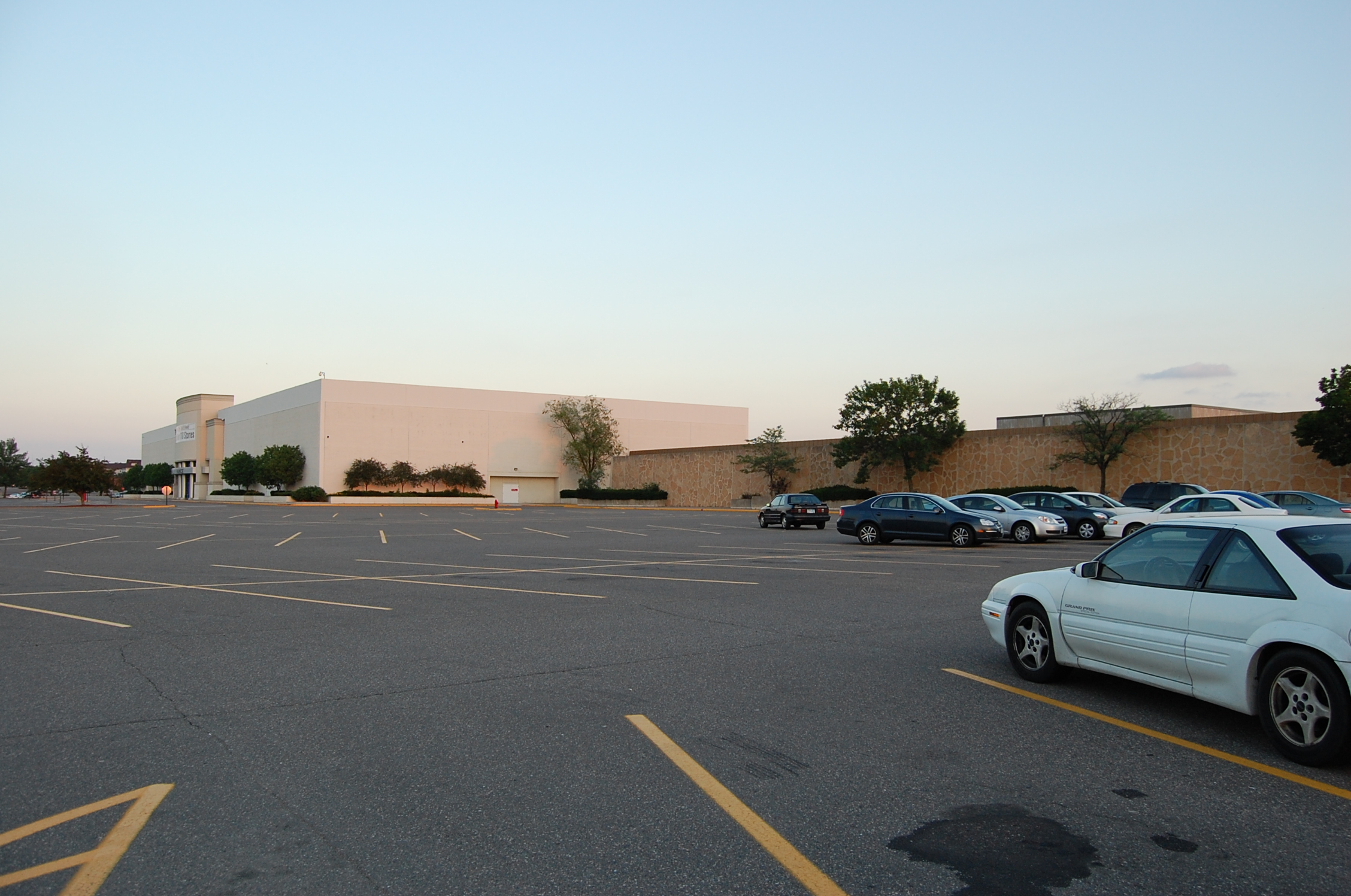
- Former Powers Dry Goods/Donaldson's anchor
- Location: Blaine, Minnesota, United States
- Coordinates: 45.12735°N 93.26065°W
- Opened: 1972
- Developer: Robert Muir
- Owner: 4th Dimension Properties
- Architect: Thorsen & Thorshov
- Num. of stores: 100
- Num. of anchor tenants: 6
- Floor area: 644,348 sq ft (59,861.9 m^{2}) (excludes Home Depot)
- Floors: 1
- Public transit: Metro Transit
- Website: northtown-mall.com

Northtown Mall is a shopping mall located in Blaine, Minnesota, United States. The mall's anchor stores are Hobby Lobby, Best Buy Outlet, 2 Becker Furniture World stores, and Burlington. In addition, Northtown Mall features over 100 stores and restaurants, as well as a food court. The mall is owned by 4th Dimension Properties. Foot traffic in 2018 was over 5.5 million people visiting the mall.

At the time of its grand opening in October 1972, it was the third largest shopping center in the Twin Cities. It was the second regional shopping center in the Twin Cities (the first being Apache Plaza in nearby St. Anthony Village) that was not owned by the Dayton Corporation, which developed the Southdale Center and later "Dales" shopping centers. Northtown Mall was located on 83 acres of land, and built at a cost of $30 million.

== History ==
A California real estate developer, Robert Muir, purchased the land in 1965. The location was along the old route of US Highway 10 where it met University Avenue. The mall was built oriented parallel to the highway, which runs in a Northwesterly direction to Anoka. The place name "Northtown" originally referred to an area at the border of Hennepin and Anoka counties, which is the current location of the BNSF Northtown railroad yards.

The mall opened in 1972 with 33 stores, The mall originally was anchored by Montgomery Ward (Northwest), Powers Dry Goods (Northeast) and Woolworth (Southwest). MainStreet (Southeast) was added as a fourth anchor in 1983. By 1988, the short-lived MainStreet chain's stores were converted to Kohl's. There was a 30-foot Titanic model on display from December 1972 until 1985, when model was moved to Marine Museum at Fall River. It was a miniature constructed for the Titanic (1953 film). There also were sunken rest areas, and aquarium, and a waterfall.

A number of other nearby retail strip malls opened around the Northtown mall: Kmart Plaza and Springbrook Mall in 1971, Northcourt Commons in 1989, and Rainbow Village in 1990 Target Greatland opened west across the street at the Springbrook Mall in nearby Coon Rapids in July 1992.

The old Woolworth's was divided between HomePlace and Best Buy in the late 1990s, the same year that a food court was added to the mall. The new US Highway 10 freeway section of between University Avenue and I-35W was completed in 1999. The old highway became County Road 10.

Powers Dry Goods was converted to Donaldson's when the Powers chain was purchased. Donaldson's then was converted to Carson Pirie Scott, then later to Mervyn's California. Mervyn's exited and then Herberger's was in the space. The same year, Mervyn's closed its Twin Cities locations. The Mervyn's at Northtown Mall was the highest-performing Mervyn's in the Minneapolis-St. Paul area. In 2001, HomePlace and Montgomery Ward closed the last of their stores; HomePlace was replaced with Steve & Barry's in 2003. Three years later, Kohl's relocated outside the mall; Kohl's has been replaced with Burlington Coat Factory, which opened in 2005. The Montgomery Ward store location anchoring the west end of the mall was closed by 2001. That portion of the mall was demolished. A The Home Depot has been built on the outlot northwest of the former anchor store; however, Home Depot does not open out into the mall itself. In 2007, LA Fitness was added to the west end of the mall as part of a renovation, The LA Fitness did not open to the mall, although the building is attached. The Paladin Career and Technical High School public charter school opened in the mall September 2002. The department store anchors, Kohl's, Mervyn's, Montgomery Ward, and HomePlace all closed between 2001 and 2006. On January 23, 2008 Bon-Ton announced that they would be opening a Herberger's in the former Mervyn's location. The store opened on September 10, 2008. The store assumed an anchor position in the mall once occupied by Carson Pirie Scott, which was a corporate sibling of Herberger's. Herberger's closed on August 30, 2018, following a nationwide trend of "big box" store closings. The north side anchor building became a Becker Furniture Outlet in 2020.

There was a renovation that started in August 2014 and was completed in fall 2015. A New Hobby Lobby store opened in 2015 with 55,000 square feet floor area at the west end of the mall. Like LA Fitness, The Hobby Lobby does not open out into the mall, but the building is attached.

On May 28, 2020, during the protests following George Floyd's murder, the mall was broken into by looters. Police quickly arrived, however, and secured the premises.

The LA Fitness was closed in 2021. The Paladin school moved to a larger location for the start of the 2022 school year. The Best Buy closed in March 2023 and re-opened as a Best Buy Outlet in the summer of 2023. As of July 2025, the Best Buy Outlet is closed due to low foot traffic. The Hobby Lobby closed in 2026. The Asia Village opened in June 2026 in the North side anchor building. It is a development similar to and larger than the Asia Mall in Eden Prairie, and features 11 eating places and a grocery store.

== Ownership ==
The Robert Muir Company sold the mall to Rein Northtown Associates of New York in 1985 for $33 million. Within nine months, it was sold to Angeles Corporation, a California investment management company, for $38.1 million. Glimcher Realty Trust bought the property for $54 million in 1998. The Glimcher Realty Trust was bought out by the Washington Prime Group in 2015. Florida-based 4th Dimension Properties bought the mall from Washington Prime for $31 million in August 2023.
