= Minneapolis Convention Center =

Large convention center located in downtown Minneapolis, Minnesota

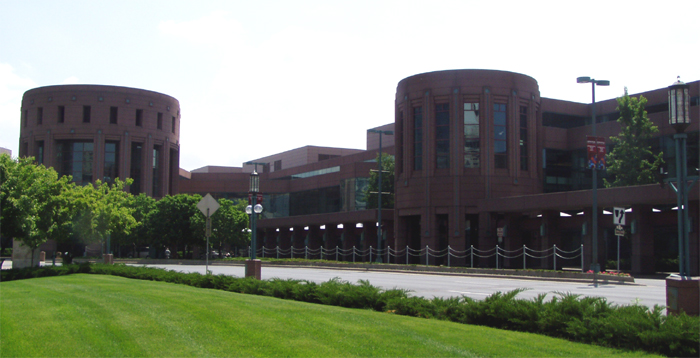
- Minneapolis Convention Center
- Interactive map of Minneapolis Convention Center
- Address: 1301 2nd Ave S Minneapolis, MN 55403
- Coordinates: 44°58′08″N 93°16′26″W
- Owner: City of Minneapolis

Construction
- Opened: December 15, 1990; 35 years ago

Website
- Venue Website

The Minneapolis Convention Center is a large convention center located in downtown Minneapolis, Minnesota that opened in 1990. Built on the former site of the Minneapolis Auditorium, it is located one block away from Nicollet Mall near Orchestra Hall. The Minneapolis Convention Center has a quadruple-domed roof and because of its volume can host multiple events on the same day.

== History ==
Before the Convention Center was built, the Twin Cities lacked a facility for major national events and trade shows. In February 1984, Governor Rudy Perpich endorsed plans to either build a new convention center somewhere in the Minneapolis–St. Paul area or expand the existing Minneapolis Auditorium Convention Hall, offering the proposed Minnesota Lottery as a potential source of funding from the state government. The city of Minneapolis had previously lost disputes with neighboring municipalities over where to build the Met Center, which went to suburban Bloomington, and the Minnesota World Trade Center, then under construction in St. Paul, and was motivated to ensure that the convention center (with its expected tax revenues) was built in Minneapolis proper. The city proposed three potential sites for the center – an expansion of the existing Auditorium Convention Hall, a site next to the Orpheum Theatre, and an area of several blocks next to the Metrodome. Bloomington officials suggested that it would be cheaper to build on the former site of Metropolitan Stadium, then slated for demolition. The state created the Minnesota Convention Facilities Commission, which decided in September 1984 to work with Minneapolis and not Bloomington. In December, the Commission picked a site next to Butler Square, straddling the planned Interstate 394, for the new center. However, the Butler Square proposal quickly lost support because building over a freeway was considered prohibitively expensive, and in April 1985 state officials agreed to expand the existing Minneapolis Auditorium instead. The Butler Square site is now occupied by Target Center and Target Field.

Having lost the opportunity for support from the state government, Bloomington mayor James Lindau continued to plan for a privately-funded convention center on the Metropolitan Stadium site, hoping that it would open before Minneapolis' could be built. After the stadium was demolished in January 1985, Bloomington's Port Authority took bids for a multi-use complex that would replace the stadium. The winning bid came from Triple Five Group, which proposed building the Minnesota International Center. This 10,000,000-square-foot (930,000 m^{2}) complex would have combined a large shopping center and indoor amusement park, similar to Triple Five's West Edmonton Mall, with a convention center significantly larger than the one being planned by Minneapolis. After visiting the West Edmonton Mall, Governor Perpich and many state legislators abandoned their support for the Minneapolis plan and endorsed the Triple Five project. After further debate, Triple Five announced it would not include a convention center in its development, which evolved into the Mall of America and eventually opened in 1992.

In January 1986, a group of three architectural firms were tasked with designing an expansion to the Auditorium complex. In June, the architects recommended tearing down the historic building instead of adding onto it. The final event at the old Auditorium was a concert by Marie Osmond on February 26, 1988, and demolition began soon after. The first phase of the new center opened on May 3, 1989. The finished complex held its grand opening on December 15, 1990. Its first major national convention, a meeting of the Retail Bakers of America, was held in April 1991.

In 1994, after four years of demand beyond expectations, a 760,000 square foot addition was approved. Work started in 1999 and was opened in 2002. The addition featured a 3,433 fixed-seat auditorium, two 99,000 square foot exhibit halls, 39 more meeting rooms, a 23,000 square foot kitchen, and 16 additional loading docks.
