= Burnsville Heart of the City station =

Rapid transit station in Burnsville, Minnesota

Burnsville Heart of the City
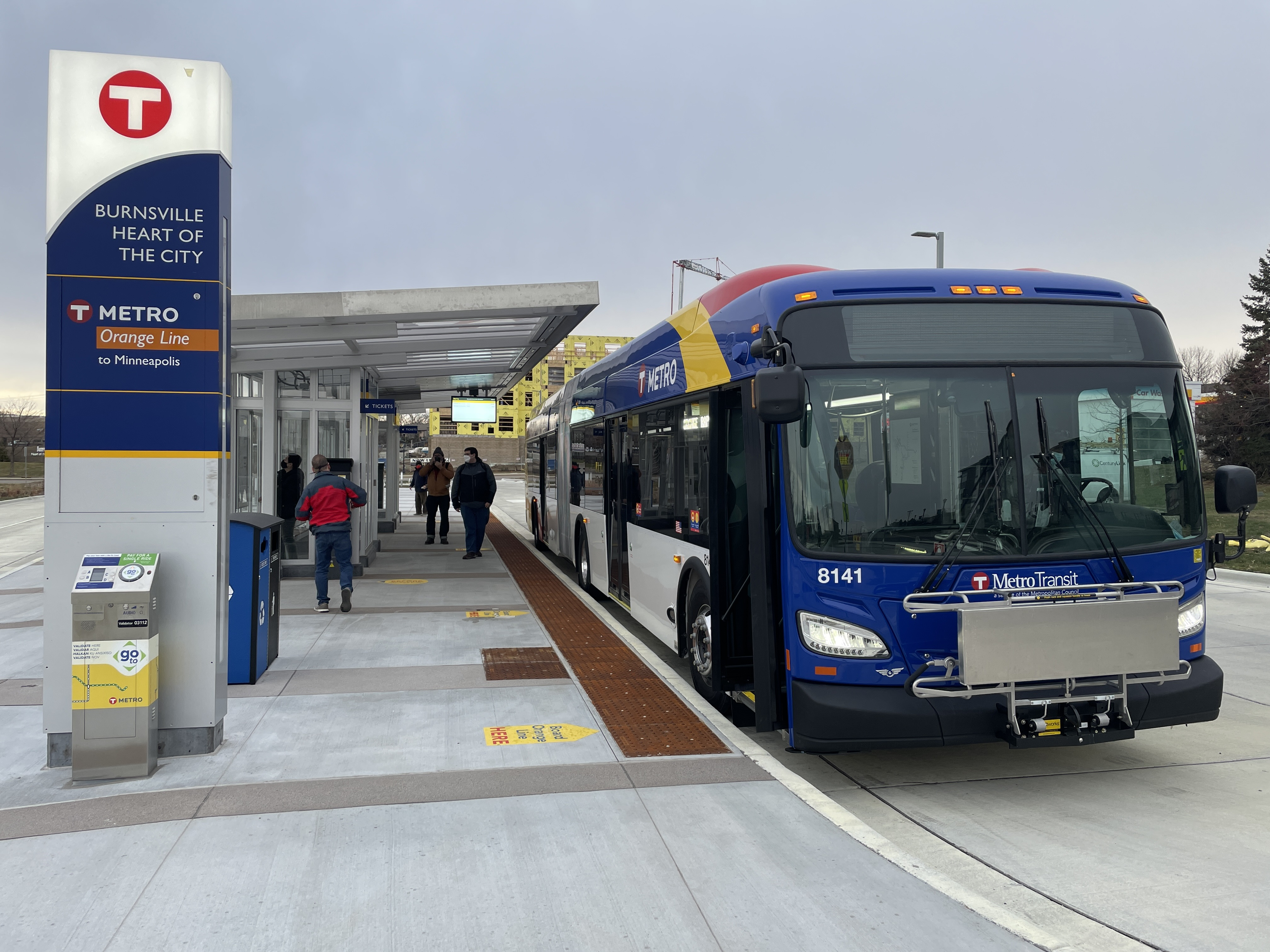
- Burnsville Heart of the City station is the southern terminus of the METRO Orange Line in Minnesota.

General information
- Coordinates: 44°46′34″N 93°16′43″W
- Owner: Metro Transit
- Line: Orange Line
- Platforms: Island
- Connections: Route 425 (Note: Burnsville Transit Station and Heart of the City Park and Ride are within 1/4 mile (400 m))

Construction
- Parking: No
- Cycle facilities: Yes, outdoor racks
- Accessible: Yes

Other information
- Station code: 56830

History
- Opened: December 4, 2021

Passengers
- 2025: 254 daily
- Rank: 47 out of 129

Services
Preceding station	Metro	Following station
I-35W & 98th Street toward Marquette-2nd Avenue & 3rd Street-Washington	Orange Line	I-35W & Burnsville Parkway One-way operation
Location

Burnsville Heart of the City is a bus rapid transit station along the Metro Orange Line and its southern terminal. The station is located at the corner of Minnesota State Highway 13 in the downtown of Burnsville, Minnesota. The station is located between Minnesota Valley Transit Authority's (MVTA) Burnsville Transit Station and Heart of the City Park and Ride, providing bus connections and park and ride capacity.

Original plans considered the Orange Line's southern terminus at MVTA's Burnsville Transit Station, but Burnsville City Council supported a new station in their downtown district, Heart of the City, kitty-corner from the MVTA facility. During the planning of the Orange Line, the station was known as Travelers Trail and later Nicollet Avenue. In 2017, Burnsville City Council recommended Burnsville Heart of the City to provide a geographical reference to their downtown, as well as strengthening local identity.

The station opened December 4, 2021 along with the rest of the Orange Line. Burnsville city officials hosted an opening day celebration at Nicollet Commons Park, one block south of the station. The Heart of the City municipal parking ramp will serve as a park-and-ride location for the station.

The Heart of the City area is a New Urbanism area with some transit-oriented development and land use patterns that feature higher density, more walkable infrastructure, and mixed-use buildings. It serves as Burnsville's downtown and has been under development since 1990s. The development patterns of the district helped encourage Metro Transit to locate the station where it is. Several Heart of the City apartment buildings have advertised the station and Orange Line in marketing materials and developers cited the station's proximity as being attractive.
