= Running Aces Casino & Racetrack =

Racino in Columbus, Minnesota, US

Running Aces Casino, Hotel & Racetrack
- Location: Columbus, Minnesota
- Coordinates: 45.24452°N 93.03379°W
- Owned by: North Metro Harness Initiative
- Date opened: April 11th, 2008
- Race type: Harness
- Course type: 5/8 mile agricultural lime & stone dust racetrack
- Notable races: Minnesota Night of Champions

Running Aces Casino and Racetrack is 5/8 mile racino located in Columbus, Minnesota. The park also has a card room. The park opened in April 2008. The live race season runs from June through August.

== History ==
In the venue's first year of operation, it ran a $4 million loss for the year. By 2010, the venue was facing foreclosure. In 2013, the track's license was revoked, and it had to pay back $400,000 in a purse shortfall.

In 2015, the racetrack rebranded itself as an "entertainment center". In 2016, Running Aces opened a trout fishing pond on the property. In 2020, the venue opened a hotel to attract visitors.

In 2024, Minnesota's racing commission voted to allow betting on historical horse racing, an effort Running Aces strongly lobbied for. Later that year, the racetrack filed a federal racketeering lawsuit against three of Minnesota's tribal casinos, arguing that the tribes were operating card games beyond regulatory agreements, in direct competition with their card room. Running Aces later added two other casinos owned by the Shakopee Mdewakanton Sioux Community to their ongoing racketeering lawsuit.

== See also ==
- Canterbury Park
