= I-35W & 98th Street station =

Bus station in Bloomington, Minnesota

I-35W & 98th Street
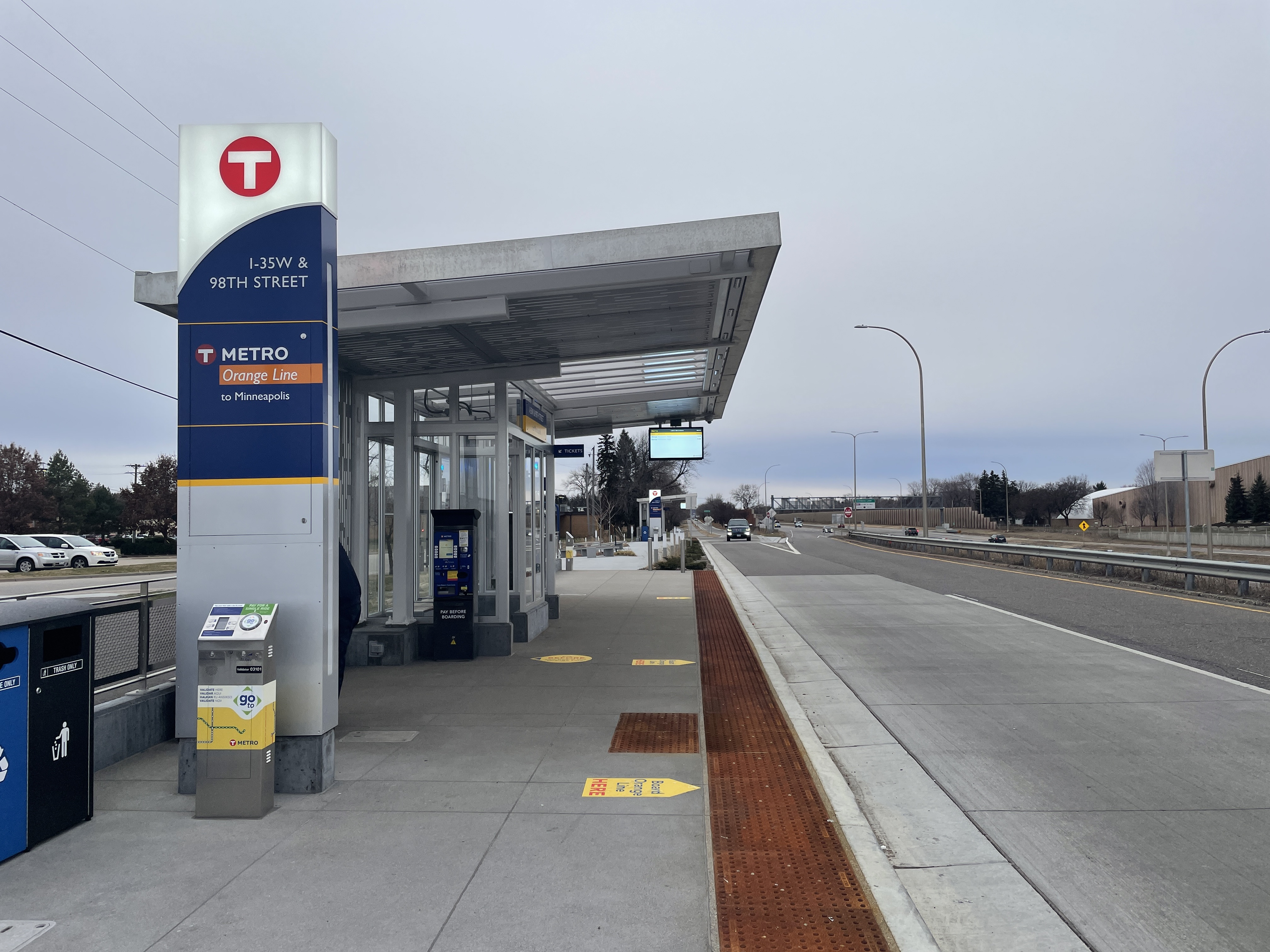
- Southbound platform for the METRO Orange Line under construction. The transit center and park and ride is to the left.

General information
- Coordinates: 44°49′30″N 93°17′26″W
- Line: Orange Line

Construction
- Accessible: Yes

History
- Opened: December 2004 (Transit Center); December 4, 2021 (Orange Line)

Passengers
- 2025: 296 daily
- Rank: 39 out of 129

Services
Preceding station	Metro	Following station
Knox & American Boulevard toward Marquette-2nd Avenue & 3rd Street-Washington	Orange Line	Burnsville Heart of the City Terminus
Location

I-35W & 98th Street is a bus rapid transit station on the Metro Orange Line at 98th Street adjacent to Interstate 35W in Bloomington, Minnesota. The station is integrated with the South Bloomington Transit Center, a transfer hub and park and ride facility opened in 2004. The transit center was as far south as Route 535, predecessor to the Orange Line, traveled, with no direct connection to the other side of the Minnesota River. The station opened December 4, 2021 with the rest of the Orange Line.

The parcels surrounding the station are being planned for a mix of transit-oriented development.

== Bus connections ==
18, 465, 534, 539, 546, Metro micro
