= Bank (disambiguation) =

A bank is a financial institution and a financial intermediary that accepts deposits and channels those deposits into lending activities.

Bank, The Bank, or banking may also refer to:

== Arts, entertainment, and media ==
=== Films ===
- DCI Banks, a British television crime drama, aired by ITV 2010–2016
- Overdrawn at the Memory Bank, a 1983 telemovie
- The Bank (1915 film), starring Charlie Chaplin
- The Bank (2001 film), starring David Wenham

=== Music ===
- "Bank", a 2017 song by Brockhampton from Saturation
- "Bank", a 2018 song by Lil Baby from Harder Than Ever
- "Bank" (Icegergert and Zivert song), a 2025 Russian song by Icegergert and Zivert

=== Other media ===
- Memory Banks (comic strip), a British comic strip
- Memory Bank (UK game show), a daytime game show which was shown on Five in the UK

== Finance ==
- Central bank
- Mutual savings bank
- Piggy bank, a device for money saving
- Savings bank

== Organizations ==
- BANK (art collective), a 1990s London art collective
- Bank (diaper bank), organizations created for the purpose of distributing free diapers to parents and caregivers unable to afford diapers
- Bank Street College of Education, a private graduate school for Early Childhood Education in New York, NY, U.S.

== Places ==
- Bánk, a village and municipality in the comitat of Nógrád, Hungary
- Bank, Iran, a city in Bushehr Province, Iran
- The Bank, Cheshire, a location in England
- The Bank, Bury, a public house in Greater Manchester, England
- Bank junction, a major road junction in the City of London
- Bank Station (OC Transpo), a bus stop in Ottawa
- Bank Street (Ottawa), Ontario, Canada
- Bank–Monument station, a tube station in London
- Bankə, Azerbaijan
- Promysel Narimanova or Bank, Azerbaijan

== Science and technology ==
=== Computing ===
- Data bank, a storage area for information in telecommunications
- Memory bank, a logical unit of storage

=== Biology and healthcare ===
- Blood bank
- Gene bank
- Ova bank
- Seed bank
- Sperm bank

=== Natural geography ===
- Bank (geography), a raised portion of seabed or sloping ground along the edge of a stream, river, or lake
- Ocean bank, a shallow area in a body of water

=== Transportation ===
- Bank engine, a railway locomotive attached to the rear of a train, usually to add haulage power over a short distance
- Bank or roll, in aircraft flight dynamics, a rotation of the vehicle about its longitudinal axis
  - Banked turn, a change of direction in which a vehicle inclines
- Cylinder bank, a single row of cylinders in an internal combustion engine

== Sport ==
- Bank shot, a type of shot in:
  - Basketball
  - Cue sports
- Citizens Bank Park or The Bank, a baseball stadium in Philadelphia, Pennsylvania, U.S.
- M&T Bank Stadium or The Bank, an American football stadium in Baltimore, Maryland, U.S.
- Bank of America Stadium or The Bank, an American football stadium in Charlotte, North Carolina, U.S.

== Other uses ==
- Bank (surname), a surname
- Bank (fortification), a type of earthwork used in field defenses or around early hillforts
- Food bank, non-profit, charitable organization that distributes food to those who have difficulty purchasing enough to avoid hunger

== See also ==
- Banker (disambiguation)
- Banks (disambiguation)
- Banku (disambiguation)
- Cache (disambiguation)
- Embankment (disambiguation)
- Mitigation banking, or environmental mitigation, government-regulated environmental offset projects
- Phone bank (disambiguation)
- Ponding bank, a technique used in regenerative agriculture to prevent soil erosion
- Shore
- Storage (disambiguation)
- Vəng (disambiguation), several places in Azerbaijan
- East Bank (disambiguation)
- Left Bank (disambiguation)
- North Bank (disambiguation)
- Right Bank (disambiguation)
- South Bank (disambiguation)
- West Bank (disambiguation)
