= Banker (disambiguation) =

A banker provides financial banking services and typically works in a bank. The word may also refer to:

- Banker (ancient), a person providing financial services in ancient Greece and Rome
- Banker (surname), a surname
- Bank engine or helper engine, a locomotive that helps other engines up steep hills
- Bankers (train), American passenger train
- The Banker, an international financial affairs publication
- The Banker (Deal or No Deal UK), the antagonist on the British game show Deal or No Deal
- "The Banker" (The Office), an episode of the sixth season of the American television show The Office
- The Bankers, 1975 book by Martin Mayer
- The Banker (1989 film), an American horror-mystery film starring Robert Forster, Shanna Reed, and Duncan Regehr
- The Banker (2015 film), a Nigerian drama film
- The Banker (2020 film), an American drama film starring Anthony Mackie
- Banker (horse), an Australian racehorse, winner of the 1863 Melbourne Cup
- Banker (card player), the player who controls the play in a gambling game
- The Banker (TV series), a 2019 South Korean television series

== See also ==
- Bank (disambiguation)
- Bancker (disambiguation)
- Baker (disambiguation)
- Banker's acceptance
- Banker's algorithm
- Bankers' bank
- Bankers' bonuses
- Banker's draft
- Banker's lamp
- Banker's mark
