= Prospect Park station (Metro Transit) =

Light rail station in Minneapolis, Minnesota

Prospect Park
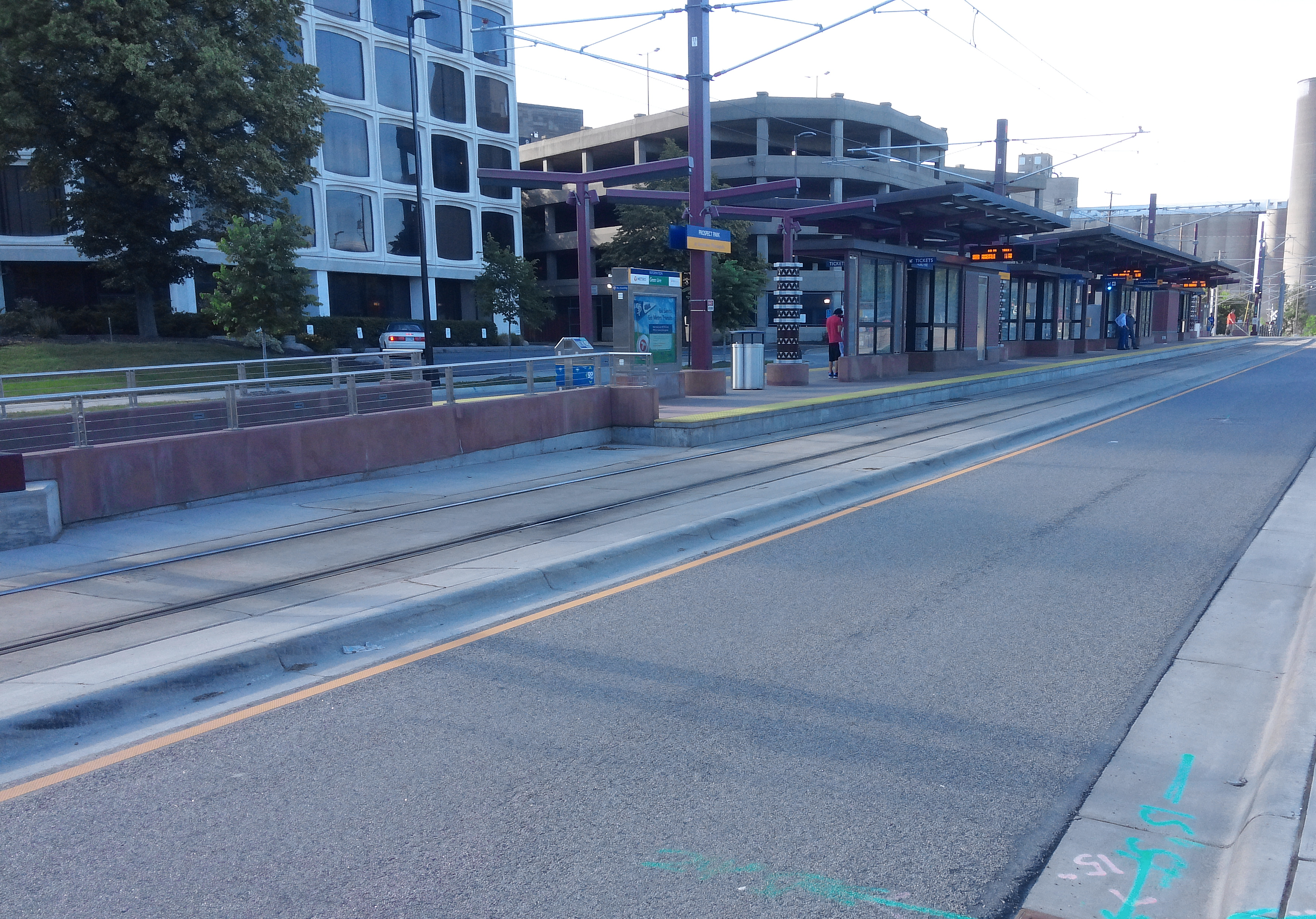
- Prospect Park station platform in June 2015

General information
- Location: 319 29th Avenue; Minneapolis, Minnesota
- Coordinates: 44°58′18″N 93°12′55″W
- Owner: Metro Transit
- Platforms: 1 island platform
- Tracks: 2
- Connections: Metro Transit: 33

Construction
- Structure type: At-grade
- Cycle facilities: Racks, Nice Ride stations, U of M Transitway
- Accessible: Yes

Other information
- Station code: PSPK

History
- Opened: June 14, 2014

Passengers
- 2025: 1,186 daily ▼2.8%
- Rank: 15 out of 37

Services
Preceding station	Metro	Following station
Stadium Village toward Target Field	Green Line	Westgate toward Saint Paul Union Depot
Location

Prospect Park station is a light rail station on the Green Line in the Prospect Park neighborhood of Minneapolis. It is located in the median of 29th Avenue just south of the University of Minnesota Transitway between 4th Street Southeast and University Avenue. It is the last stop in Minneapolis on the Green Line before Saint Paul.

== History ==
Construction of the rail line along the transitway began in 2011, and station construction began in 2012. During planning and early construction the station was known as 29th Avenue. The station opened along with the rest of the line in 2014.

A bus rapid transit station, University & 29th Avenue, was considered for the E Line, but not pursued due to a too far distance between stations. Instead two stations at 27th Street and Malcolm Avenue were chosen. When operational in 2025 the Green Line and E Line will resemble skip-stop service between Stadium Village and Westgate stations.

== Ridership ==
Ridership at the station has increased significantly after much of the surrounding land use was transformed from industrial to housing.

View chart definition.
