= Banks (disambiguation) =

Banks are financial institutions.

Banks or The Banks may also refer to:

== Places ==
=== Australia ===
- Banks, Australian Capital Territory, a suburb of Canberra
- County of Banks, Queensland
- Division of Banks, an electoral district in New South Wales
- Moa Island (Queensland) or Banks Island

=== Canada ===
- Banks Island, one of the Canadian Arctic islands
- Banks Island (British Columbia)
- Banks Peninsula (Nunavut)

=== New Zealand ===
- Banks Peninsula, South Island, New Zealand

=== United Kingdom ===
- Banks, Cumbria, a village
- Banks, Dumfries and Galloway, a location
- The Banks, Greater Manchester, a location
- Banks, Lancashire, a village
- The Banks, Wiltshire

=== United States ===
- Banks, Alabama
- Banks, Arkansas
- Banks County, Georgia
- Banks, Idaho
- Banks, Oregon
- The Banks, Cincinnati, a development project in Cincinnati, Ohio
- Banks Township (disambiguation)

=== Vanuatu ===
- Banks Islands, Vanuatu

== Other uses ==
- Banks (album), a 2012 album by Paul Banks
- Bank (geography), the land alongside a body of water
- Banks (given name)
- Banks (surname), a surname (and list of people and fictional characters with the name)
- Banks (singer) (born 1988), American singer
- Banks', a brand of Marston's Brewery
- Banks Barbados Brewery
- FaZe Banks, CEO of FaZe Clan
- Food bank

== See also ==
- Bank (disambiguation)
- Lists of banks
