= Stadium Village station =

Light rail station in Minneapolis, Minnesota

Stadium Village
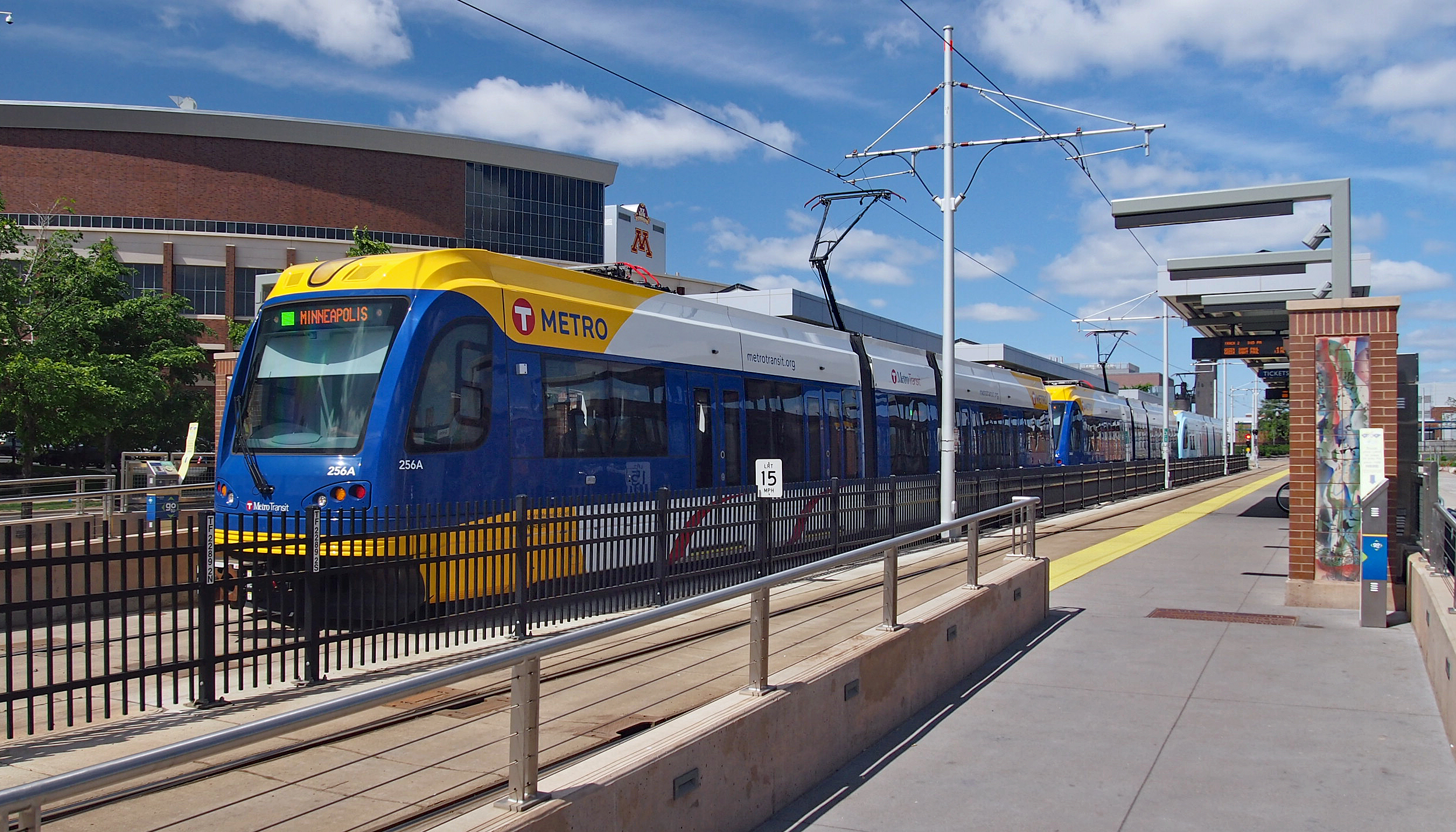
- Stadium Village station platform

General information
- Location: 2301 University Avenue; Minneapolis, Minnesota
- Coordinates: 44°58′29″N 93°13′23″W
- Owner: Metro Transit
- Platforms: 2 side platforms
- Tracks: 2
- Connections: Metro Transit: 6, 33

Construction
- Structure type: At-grade
- Cycle facilities: Racks, Nice Ride stations, U of M Transitway
- Accessible: Yes

Other information
- Station code: STVI

History
- Opened: June 14, 2014

Passengers
- 2025: 1,495 daily ▲13.9%
- Rank: 8 out of 37

Services
Preceding station	Metro	Following station
East Bank toward Target Field	Green Line	Prospect Park toward Saint Paul Union Depot
Location

Stadium Village station is a light rail station on the Green Line on the University of Minnesota campus in Minneapolis. Located in the Stadium Village area, it lies east of 23rd Avenue Southeast between University Avenue and 4th Street, across the road from Huntington Bank Stadium. East of the station, the rail line parallels the U of M Transitway until 29th Street SE, where it turns to enter Prospect Park station.

== History and design ==
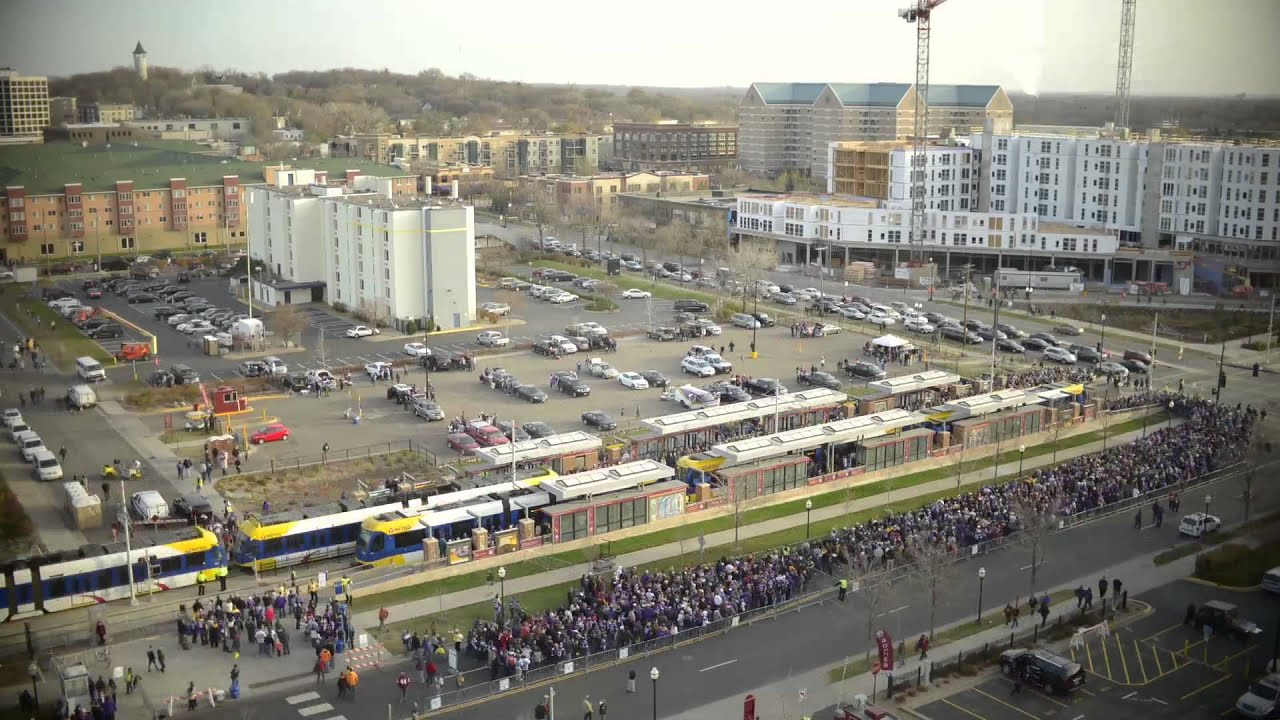
Queues for trains after a Minnesota Vikings game in November 2014.

The first light rail proposal in 1981 by the Metropolitan Council identified an Oak Street station on Washington Avenue adjacent to Stadium Village's namesake Memorial Stadium. These plans, which included an entire network, were largely mothballed after the Minnesota Legislature banned the use of public funds on light rail transit in 1985.

In 1999 a direct bus predecessor to the Green Line, Route 50, was created as a limited stop service with Oak Street also the final stop on campus before 27th Avenue. The original Central Corridor design was roughly similar to its current design at 23rd Avenue, except the station would be configured as a sunken island platform. Directly south would have been the west portal for a tunnel under Washington Avenue. North it would have followed the same alignment and climbed to grade parallel with the Transitway. The Final EIS in 2009 concluded trains would run at grade on Washington Avenue, modifying the station to be built at grade configuration.

Construction of the line along the Transitway began in 2011, with construction of the station starting in 2012. The station opened along with the rest of the line in 2014.

Stadium Village was the west end of a free-fare zone with the Campus Zone Pass available to University of Minnesota students, staff, and facility. The program launched with the fall 2014 semester and was discontinued the fall 2022 semester after the university moved to a free universal transit pass for students.

In 2025 the E Line opened to serve the station, with new University & 23rd Avenue station facilities constructed for bus rapid transit operations.

== Bus connections ==
Connections can be made to local Routes 6 and 33 on University Avenue. At the U of M Transitway connections can be made to University of Minnesota Campus Shuttle Routes 121 (Campus Connector) and 120 (East Bank Circulator) and express Route 272. There is a significant transfer point short distance west at University Avenue and Oak Street. Connections could be made to Route 960 during the 2019 Minnesota State Fair season due to a detour; service was suspended for following seasons.

The Green Line Night Bus and rail replacement buses stop on University Avenue.
