= East Bank (disambiguation) =

The East Bank is the part of the Southern Levant east of the Jordan River, mostly contained in present-day Jordan.

East Bank may also refer to:

== Places ==
- East Bank, West Virginia, a town in the US
- Nicollet Island/East Bank, Minneapolis, a neighborhood in Minneapolis, US
- Eastbank Esplanade, a pedestrian and bicycle path in Portland, Oregon, US
- Banda Oriental (East Bank), now Uruguay and southern Brazil
- East Bank, an educational and cultural development in Queen Elizabeth Olympic Park, London

== Education ==
- Eastbank Academy, Glasgow, Scotland
- East Bank, a campus of the University of Minnesota, Minneapolis, US
  - East Bank station, serving the campus

== See also ==
- Southport Eastbank Street railway station, Merseyside, England
- Eastern Bank (disambiguation)
