= Neva embankments =

The Neva embankment refer to various embankments along the Neva River in Saint Petersburg, Russia:

- The Admiralty Embankment (Russian: Адмиралтейская набережная, Admiralteyskaya Naberezhnaya), a street along the Neva River in Central Saint Petersburg
- The English Embankment (Russian: Английская набережная, Angliyskaya Naberezhnaya), a street along the Neva River in Central Saint Petersburg
- The Kutuzov Embankment (Russian: Набережная Кутузова, Naberezhnaya Kutuzova)
- The Palace Embankment (Russian: Дворцовая набережная, Dvortsovaya Naberezhnaya), a street along the Neva River in Central Saint Petersburg
- The Universitetskaya Embankment (Russian: Университетская набережная), an embankment on the Bolshaya Neva, on Vasilievsky Island in Saint Petersburg, Russia
- Admiral Makarov Embankment, near Tuchkov Bridge

== See also ==
- Embankment (disambiguation)
