= Bank, Azerbaijan =

Bank, Azerbaijan may refer to:

- Bankə, Azerbaijan
- Promysel Narimanova, Azerbaijan
- Vəng (disambiguation), several places in Azerbaijan
