= University of Minnesota Campus Shuttle =

Zero-fare bus service in Minnesota, U.S.

Campus Shuttle
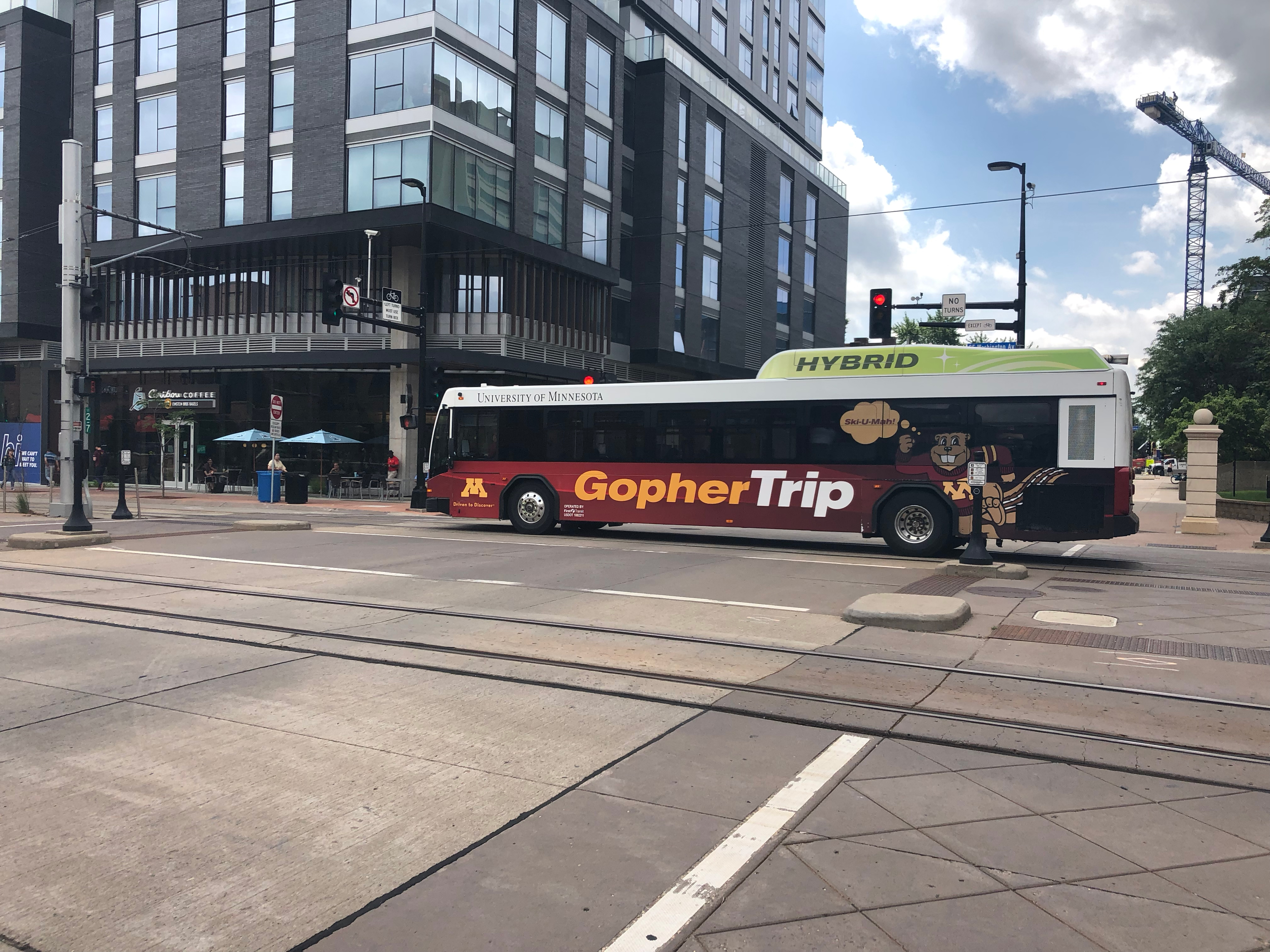
- Hybrid bus on Washington Avenue Mall, East Bank
- Parent: University of Minnesota Parking and Transportation Services
- Headquarters: 511 Washington Avenue SE; Minneapolis, MN 55455
- Locale: Minneapolis, Minnesota; Falcon Heights, Minnesota
- Service area: University of Minnesota
- Service type: Bus rapid transit Paratransit
- Routes: 7
- Depots: 901 29th Avenue SE; Minneapolis, MN 55414
- Operator: Transdev

The University of Minnesota's Campus Shuttle is a zero-fare bus service operating on the University's Minneapolis and St. Paul (Falcon Heights) campuses. In 2009, the system carried more than 3.9 million riders, making it the second-busiest transit system in Minnesota after the Twin Cities' primary provider Metro Transit. It outpaces all of the suburban transit providers in the Twin Cities, as well as providers in other metropolitan areas in the state. Duluth Transit Authority serving Duluth, Minnesota, and Superior, Wisconsin, is the state's third-busiest provider, while the Minnesota Valley Transit Authority ranks fourth. The shuttles are operated under contract by Transdev through the University's Parking and Transportation Services (PTS) department.

== System description ==
There are seven regular routes in the system. Additionally, the University operates paratransit services and offers a shuttle route during game days at Huntington Bank Stadium.

Route number	Route name	Terminal	Ridership (2023-24)	Route description	Notes
120	East Bank Circulator	Fay Thompson Center for Environmental Management	13,752	This route circles counter-clockwise through the East Bank campus.	
121	Campus Connector	St. Paul Student Center	1,798,739	The route begins on St. Paul campus on Buford Avenue and along the edge of the Minnesota State Fairgrounds before entering the University of Minnesota Transitway. The route does not stop until Huntington Bank Stadium, where it loops around the north end and continues west along 4th Street SE. The route turns south onto 15th Avenue to Washington Avenue bridge, where it continues to West Bank, looping over Washington Avenue on Cedar Avenue, and stopping at Blegen Hall for layover.	This is the longest and busiest route in the system.
121	Campus Connector	Blegen Hall	1,798,739	The route departs Blegen Hall and crosses the Washington Avenue bridge, stopping at the Student Union before entering the Washington Avenue transit mall. The next stop is at Huntington Bank Stadium on Oak Street, and then the route enters the University of Minnesota Transitway after a stop at Stadium Village station. The route runs along the edge of the Minnesota State Fairgrounds and Buford Avenue before laying over at St. Paul Student Center.	This is the longest and busiest route in the system.
122	University Avenue Circulator	Carlson School of Management	418,274	This route circles clockwise from the West Bank to the East Bank and back across the Mississippi River using the 10th Avenue Bridge, University Avenue, Washington Avenue Mall, and the Washington Avenue Bridge. During weeknights and weekends, the route is extended to Territorial and Frontier Residence Halls on East Bank and Middlebrook Hall on West Bank.	
123	4th Street Circulator	19th Avenue Ramp	282,204	This route circles counter-clockwise from West Bank to the East Bank across the Mississippi River using the Washington Avenue Bridge, Washington Avenue Mall, 4th Street SE, and the 10th Avenue Bridge. It is a directional pair to the University Avenue Circulator.	
124	St. Paul Campus Circulator	St. Paul Student Center	17,978	This route circles clockwise through the St. Paul campus.	
125	Dinkytown Connector	Carlson School of Management at 4th St S	—	This route connects Dinkytown and West Bank. Starting from Carlson School of Management, it loops around Hanson Hall, goes north to cross the 10th Avenue Bridge, and makes a loop around Dinkytown via University Avenue SE, 15th Avenue SE, 7th ST SE, and 10th Avenue SE, before going back over to West Bank.	Opened in 2025.
126	Campus Express	St. Paul Student Center	—	This route circulates through the St. Paul campus, East (including Dinkytown), and West Bank campuses. It starts at the St. Paul Student Center, then stops at the intersection of Cleveland Avenue and Como Avenue, going then back to Coffman Memorial Union. The route then goes over the Washington Avenue Bridge to make a stop at Willey Hall on West Bank, going over the 10th Avenue bridge onto University Avenue where it makes a stop at University and Pleasant St SE in Dinkytown, to then complete the route by going back to the Cleveland and Como stop, finishing at the St. Paul Student Center.	Opened in 2026. Intended to cut down on travel time between campuses by having fewer stops than the 121.

The system began running hybrid-electric buses in 2008. As of 2010, the system's fleet is primarily composed of hybrid buses. The system also uses a handful of Van Hool European-styled BRT buses leased from the corporation as to not violate the Buy America Act, which requires transit vehicles to be built in the United States.

During the school year on regular weekdays, the shuttles operate with schedule-less service as often as every five minutes. In 2008, the system carried 3.55 million riders. Despite the fact that the shuttle service is free, it is comparatively inexpensive to operate: with an operating cost of $4.55 million in 2008, the operating subsidy was only $1.28 per passenger. For comparison, Metro Transit's busy Metro Blue Line required a subsidy of $1.44 that year, and that was with many riders paying $1.75 or more for a ride.

In 2010, Parking and Transportation Services received the annual Transit System of the Year award from the Minnesota Public Transit Association.

== GopherTrip ==
GopherTrip is real-time information system that provides bus arrival information to assist in trip planning for the Campus Shuttle system. GopherTrip is available as a mobile app for iPhone and Android systems. Users can also text a stop number to 41411 and receive estimated arrival times for that stop. Certain stops on the system have audiovisual arrival boards. Since buses do not operate on schedules, merely time-points, the app has become useful for trip planning. At the beginning of the 2018 school year, buses were repainted to promote the GopherTrip service.

Audiovisual arrival boards are synced with NexTrip, Metro Transit's own real-time information service, and will announce and display only local buses who share stops. However, the app has no integration with Metro Transit's own app or offers information on any outside service. Sequentially, NexTrip cannot predict the arrival of Campus Shuttles.

== Ridership ==
The ridership statistics shown here are of fixed route services only and do not include demand response services.

== See also ==
- Metro Transit
