= Go-To card =

Transit farecard in Minnesota, U.S.

- Current Go-To card design
- Location: Minneapolis–Saint Paul, Minnesota
- Launched: 2007
- Technology: MIFARE
- Operator: Cubic Transportation Systems
- Currency: United States dollar ($400 maximum load)
- Validity: Metro Transit; SouthWest Transit; Minnesota Valley Transit Authority
- Retailed: Stations; Online; Mail order; Independent retailers; Metro Transit Service Centers
- Variants: Metropass; U-Pass/College Pass
- Website: www.metrotransit.org/go-to-card

Original Go-To card

The Go-To card is a contactless smart card used to pay fares for bus, light rail, and commuter rail lines operated by Metro Transit and other transit agencies in the Twin Cities area of Minnesota. The system has significantly sped up boardings on area buses while alleviating wear and tear on existing ticket machines and fare boxes. The old magnetic strip reading machines were weather sensitive and could not be placed out in the elements like at the Hiawatha Line light rail stations.

The Go-To card went into full operation in early 2007.

== Problems and delays ==
The Go-To card was originally meant to go into service in September 2003 and become the first such system in the United States, but technical difficulties delayed introduction. Cubic Transportation Systems, Inc. worked under a contract valued at $16.4 million (equivalent to $27.5 million in 2025), but Metro Transit stopped payment at $9.4 million in May 2003 when it became apparent that the rollout would be behind schedule.

Cubic Transportation Systems initially promoted this system as the first contactless smart card installation in the country, but since introduction was delayed, at least one other system in the U.S. went into use ahead of the Go-To card. While traditional smart card systems require the card to be swiped through or inserted into a reader, the Go-To card requires a passenger to tap it against the reading device. This reduces mechanical wear dramatically, and removes the need for readers to be hardened against the sometimes cold and wet climate of Minnesota. Ticket machines on Metro Transit's Blue Line were designed with the Go-To card in mind.

Before this system was sent into full release, some Metro Transit employees and selected area riders were part of a test program, started in the latter half of 2004, using the cards as they go about their daily business. In November 2004 after five months of service, Metro Transit's general manager stated that the devices only achieved 20% reliability.

Cubic said that the issues that were originally delaying introduction were software problems. Frequently, either the reader or the card did not properly detect when it has been used. Software for the central computer system, which handles synchronization and how funds are replenished, was not fully operational until late April 2005. In March 2006 Metro Transit sent Cubic a letter of default demanding a plan to correct issues with the 2 1/2-year-delayed system.

The underlying technology is Philips' MIFARE system, implementing the ISO/IEC 14443 (Type A) standard.

== Full service ==
In November 2005, Metro Transit allowed 18,000 trial users to begin using the Go-To card system, with hopes of rolling out the cards to all users by the fourth quarter of 2006.

On November 15, 2006, Metro Transit unveiled the Go-To card for 2,500 users to use during a trial period lasting until January 31, 2007. By April 2007, Go-To cards were being sold to the general public at Metro Transit stores. It is also possible to buy and refill cards at other locations that sell transit passes, such as some local grocery stores.

== Metropass ==
The Metropass is a transit pass for trains and buses sold at a discounted rate to employees purchased by local companies. The pass is purchased monthly and allows unlimited rides during the month.

== College transit pass programs ==
=== University of Minnesota ===
The Metro Transit U-Pass program was created in 2000 and was a discounted transit pass sold only to University of Minnesota students or employees taking at least one credit of courses. The pass allowed for an unlimited number of rides during the semester it was purchased and had a mandatory $19 (as of Spring 2013) transportation fee not included with the actual cost of the pass. The University of Minnesota switched to the Go-To card in 2007 which allowed for semester renewal up to six years. For the 2021-2022 school year, the cost was $114. Starting with the 2022-2023 school year, the U-Pass was eliminated in favor of a $45 increase in the mandatory transportation fee but the universal availability of unlimited transit rides for all students.

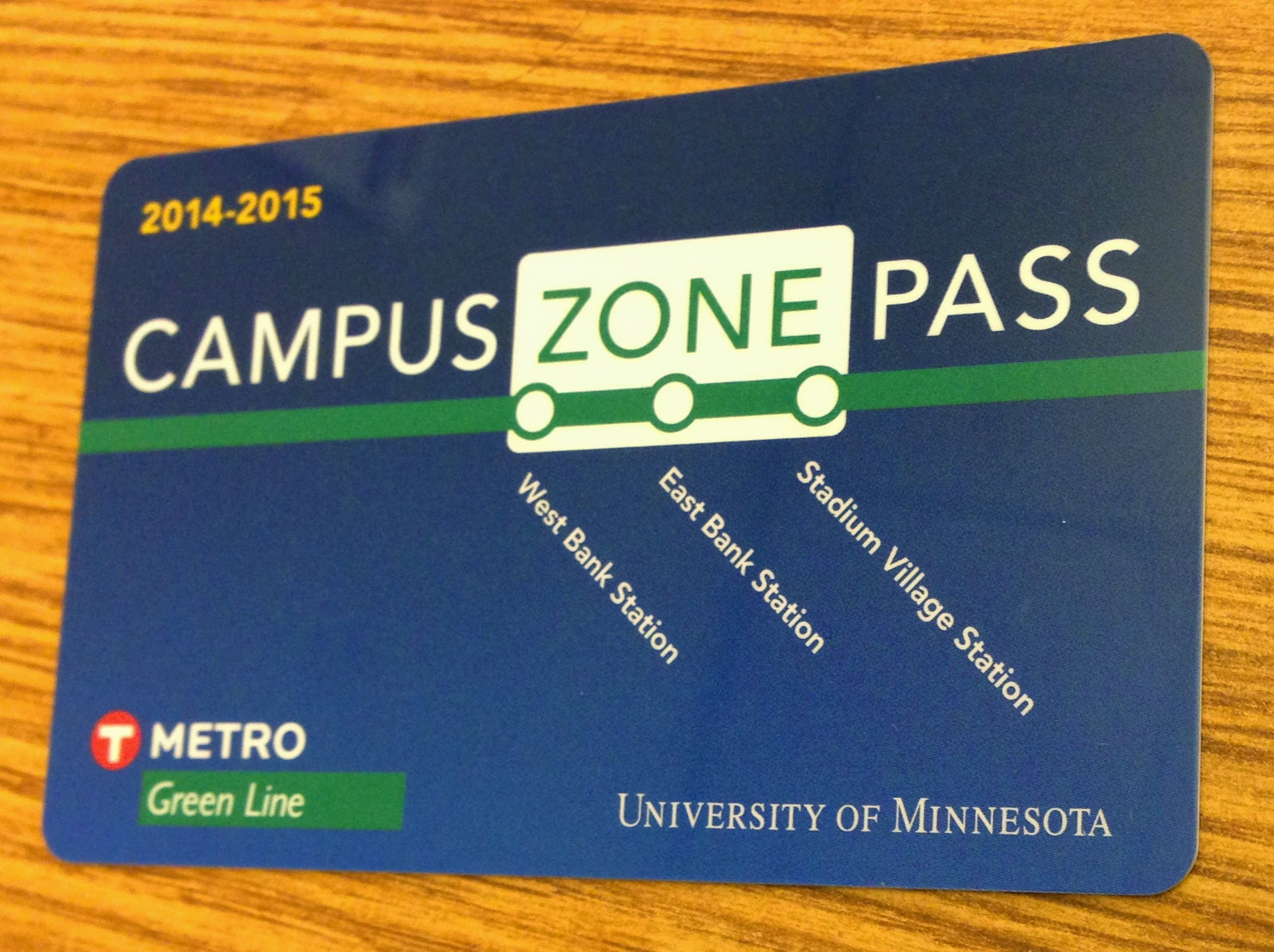
Campus Zone Pass card

The Campus Zone Pass allowed free travel between the West Bank, East Bank, and Stadium Village Green Line light rail stations. The card was free to registered students, faculty, and staff of the University of Minnesota Twin Cities. The Campus Zone Pass was eliminated with the introduction of the Universal Transit Pass program for University of Minnesota students.

=== College Pass ===
The Go-To College Pass is a pass good for unlimited bus and train rides per semester in the Minneapolis-St. Paul area sold at a discounted rate to eligible college and university students. Participating schools include Anoka-Ramsey Community College, Anoka Technical College, Augsburg University, Aveda Institute, Bethel University, Century College, Concordia University, Dunwoody College of Technology, Hamline University, Hennepin Technical College, Inver Hills Community College, Macalester College, Metropolitan State University, Minneapolis Business College, Minneapolis College of Art and Design, Minneapolis Community and Technical College, Normandale Community College, North Central University, North Hennepin Community College, Northwestern Health Sciences University, Saint Mary's University of Minnesota, St. Catherine University, Saint Paul College and University of St. Thomas. Ridership at Augsburg and Macalester nearly doubled after all students were given universal transit passes allowing unlimited transit rides.

== Limited Edition Go-To Cards ==
Event	Image	Description
Metro Green Line Grand Opening		This Go-To Card was sold/given out ahead of the grand opening of the METRO Green Line that runs between downtown Minneapolis and downtown St. Paul.
MLB All Star Week 2014		Commemorative All-Star Week Go-To Cards with $20 of stored fare value were available for purchase through Metro Transit's online store, at Metro Transit Service Centers and at The Minneapolis Convention Center.
LGBTQ+ Pride 2023		This Go-To Card was sold at Metro Transit Service Centers and was given out at the Twin Cities Pride Festival in 2023.
LGBTQ+ Pride 2024		This Go-To Card was given out at the Twin Cities Pride Festival in 2024.
LGBTQ+ Pride 2025		This Go-To Card was given out at the Twin Cities Pride Festival in 2025.
Adopt A Stop Volunteer		This Go-To Card is provided to community members that volunteer to clean up a bus stop, BRT Station or LRT Station.
LGBTQ+ Pride 2026		This Go-To Card was given out at the Twin Cities Pride Festival in 2026.
