= Bancker =

Bancker may refer to:

People:

- Emily Bancker (1861/62–1897), American stage actress
- Evert Bancker (mayor) (1665–1734), American trader and politician, mayor of Albany, New York
- Evert Bancker (speaker) (1721–1803), American merchant and politician, speaker of the New York state assembly
- Mary E. C. Bancker (1860–?), American author
- Gerard Bancker 1740–1799), American surveyor and politician, New York State Treasurer
- Studs Bancker (1853–1888), American professional baseball player

Places

- Bancker, Louisiana

== See also ==
- Banker (disambiguation)
