= Left Bank =

Left Bank generally refers to the bank of a river or other body of water that is on the left side when facing downstream. It may specifically refer to:

== Places ==
- Left Bank of the Rhine, the western bank of the Rhine, formerly part of the Holy Roman Empire
- Left Bank (Biscay), the left bank of the Nervión in Biscay, Spain
- The left bank of the Ishim in Astana, Kazakhstan
- Left-bank Ukraine, a historical region in Ukraine and part of Kyiv
- Bordeaux wine regions#Left Bank, a wine region in France
- Left Bank, a laneway adjoining Cuba Street, Wellington
- Rive Gauche, the southern bank of the Seine in Paris, France

== Other uses ==
- Left Bank (horse), an American Thoroughbred racehorse
- Left Bank (film), a 2008 Belgian film
- Rive Gauche Nightclub, a Parisian-themed nightclub in the River West District of Chicago, US
- Left Bank, an offshoot of the French New Wave
- "Left Bank", a song from the 2007 album Pocket Symphony by Air
- LB.ua, or Left Bank, a Ukrainian online newspaper
- St Margaret of Antioch Church, Leeds, now an arts centre known as Left Bank Leeds

== See also ==
- Bank (geography)
- Right Bank (disambiguation)
- The Left Banke, a 1960s American pop group
- Administrative-Territorial Units of the Left Bank of the Dniester
