= Rive Gauche Nightclub =

Coordinates: 41°53′13.5″N 87°38′51.8″W

Rive Gauche Nightclub, open late 1999 to mid-2005, was a popular nightclub located in the River West district near Chicago's Greektown neighborhood, and the Loop. Rive Gauche is a French title meaning Left Bank, an appropriate name for a nightclub that had a unique Parisian theme, despite it being located on the right bank of the Chicago River. Rive Gauche is simply known as Rive by Chicago’s nightclub enthusiast community.

== History & Atmosphere ==
Before Rive opened as a nightclub that eventually catered to a crowd of Chicago's young Polish population, it was known as a predominantly male homosexual venue dubbed The Generator. It is true that the owners of The Generator and Rive's owners are the same.

Rive was the place to be for European tourists and celebrities at the height of its popularity. Its visitors included the founder of Playboy Magazine, Hugh Hefner. Rive was undoubtedly an adult playground where only female patrons were allowed to dance on stripper poles and the miniature Eiffel Tower statues, sometimes three or four at a time. Some young women would eagerly participate in these stripper-like activities to gain attention from young male patrons, and the house-sanctioned photographers.

Early 2003 also saw troubles for Rive Nightclub. The E2 nightclub catastrophe on Chicago's South Side caused the city to create a task force to inspect all Chicago nightclubs for possible capacity violations and other building code violations. Rive was immediately handed a citation and had to close down for short period of time to fix their outside exit doors so they will open outward as opposed to inward.

In 2005, due to the age of the nightclub and patrons passing up Rive for newer venues, Rive Gauche Nightclub owners decided to close down and remodel the club back into the Generator, a club catering particularly to the African-American gay community. The Generator closed its doors on September 16, 2007 to remodel and reopen as Mannequin on November 30, 2007. The new mainstream club boasts itself as a modern-day spin on what Rive used to be.

=== Mannequin Nightclub (2007 - 2009) ===
Mannequin is among the few nightspots to implement Illinois's statewide public smoking ban well before becoming law on January 1, 2008. One reason for doing so is to preserve the club's new decor.
