= Right Bank =

Right Bank generally refers to the bank of a river or other body of water that is on the right side when facing downstream. It may specifically refer to:

- Right Bank (Biscay), the right bank of the Nervión in Biscay, Spain
- Right-bank Ukraine, a historical region in Ukraine
- Right Bank (Bordeaux), a wine region in France
- Rive Droite, the northern right bank of the Seine in Paris, France

== See also ==
- Bank (geography)
- Left Bank (disambiguation)
