= Eastern Bank (disambiguation) =

Eastern Bank may also refer to:

- Eastern Bank Ltd, a former British bank founded in 1909, and acquired by Chartered Bank (now Standard Chartered) in 1957.
- Eastern Bank, a large bank in New England, Massachusetts; founded as Salem Savings Bank in 1818 and renamed to Eastern Bank in 1989.
- Eastern Bank Ltd (Bangladesh), a bank headquartered in Dhaka, Bangladesh and commenced operation in 1992.

== See also ==
- East Bank
