= South Bank (disambiguation) =

The South Bank is an area of Central London, England.

South Bank or Southbank may also refer to:

== Places ==
=== United Kingdom ===
- South Bank, Redcar and Cleveland, a suburb of Redcar, North Yorkshire, England
- South Bank, York, a suburb of York, North Yorkshire, England
- Leeds South Bank, an area of Leeds, West Yorkshire, England

=== Australia ===
- South Bank, Queensland, an area of Brisbane, Australia
  - South Bank Parklands
- Southbank, Victoria, a suburb of Melbourne, Australia
  - Southbank tram depot

=== United States ===
- Southbank (Jacksonville), a neighborhood of Jacksonville, Florida, US
  - Southbank Riverwalk
- South Bank (PAT station), Pittsburgh, Pennsylvania, US
- Southbank Riverwalk, ecological park
- Southbank, Chicago

== Arts and culture ==
- Southbank Centre, a complex of artistic venues in London, England
  - BFI Southbank, the leading repertory cinema in the UK
- The South Bank Show, a television arts magazine show

== Education ==
- London South Bank University, England
- Southbank Institute, Brisbane, Queensland, Australia
- Southbank International School, London, England

== See also ==
- Bank of the South, a monetary fund and lending organization for the Americas
