= Banks (given name) =

- Gender: unisex

Origin
- Origin: English
- Meaning: from English place name meaning “by a bank.”

Banks is a given name of English origin that is a transferred use of a surname or place name that means “by a bank.” It also has modern associations with wealth due to the name for a financial institution and the family surname of the family in the Mary Poppins books and the 1964 film and its 2018 sequel and to Banksy, a pseudonymous England-based street artist and political activist.

The name has recently increased in popularity as a name for boys born in the United States, along with other names derived from surnames and names ending in the letter “s.” The name has recently been used for their children by celebrities, which raised awareness of the name among parents. It was first ranked among the top 1,000 names used for newborn American boys in 2019 and rose in popularity in 2020 and 2021. The name is also in use for girls.
