= Banker (surname) =

Banker is a surname. Notable people with the surname include:

- Ashok Banker (born 1964), Indian author and screenwriter
- Bill Banker (1907–1985), American college football player
- Grace Banker (1892–1960, director of the World War I Signal Corps Female Telephone Operators Unit, Distinguished Service Medal recipient
- Howard James Banker (1866–1940), American mycologist
- Mark Banker (born 1956), American football coach
