= U of M Transitway =

Busway in Minnesota, U.S.

Coordinates: 44.97429°N 93.19953°W

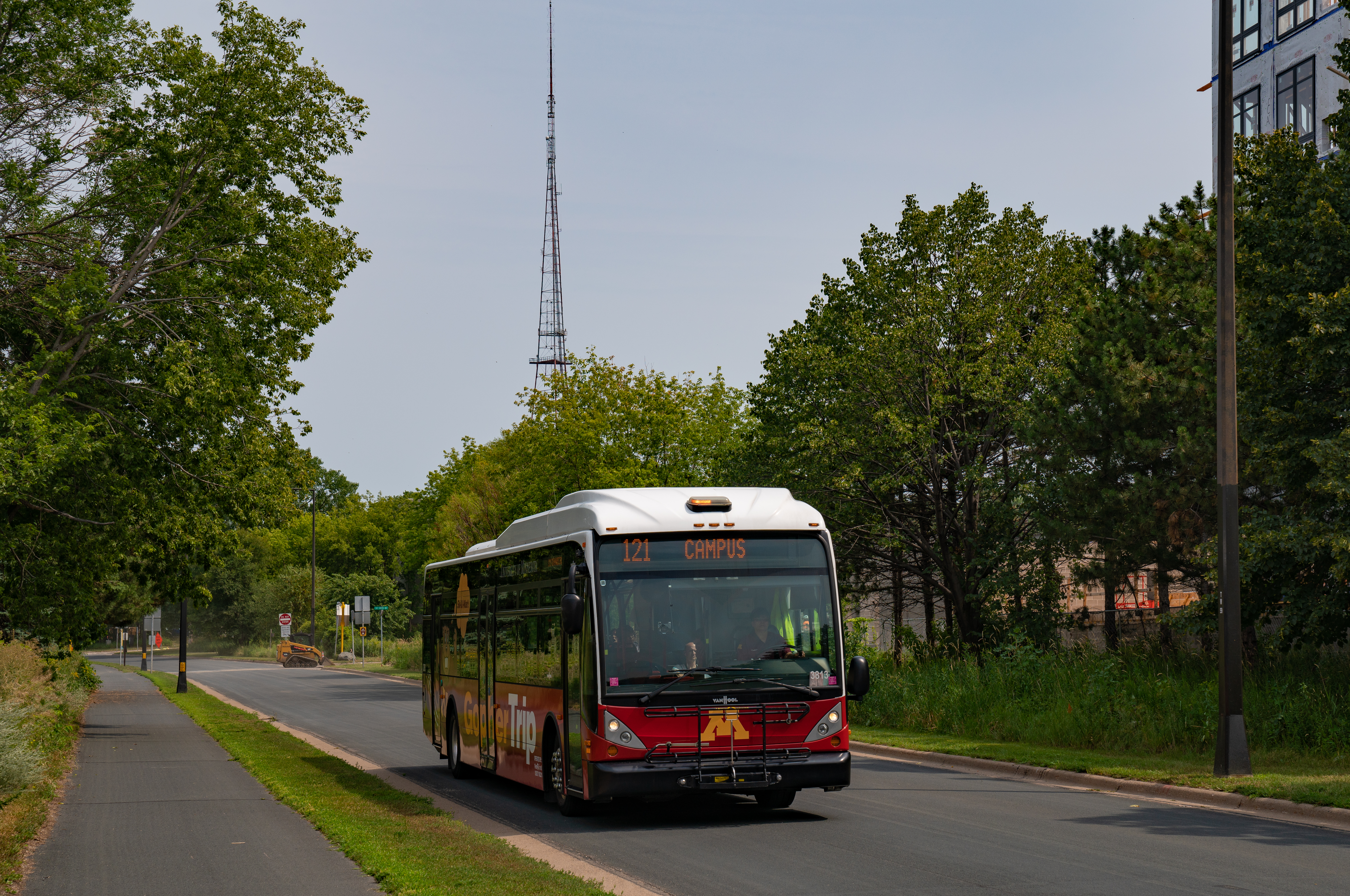
- A U of M Campus Connector bus near the Transitway's western terminus

Overview
- Locale: Minneapolis–Saint Paul, Minnesota
- Termini: U of M East Bank Campus; U of M St. Paul Campus
- Connecting lines: METRO Green Line
- Stations: 2

Service
- Type: Bus rapid transit
- System: University of Minnesota Campus Shuttle
- Services: Year-round: 121 Campus Connector; Seasonal: Minnesota State Fair shuttles
- Operator(s): University of Minnesota

History
- Opened: 1992

Technical
- Line length: 2.6 mi (4.2 km)
- Character: At-grade
- Operating speed: 40 mph (64 km/h)

The U of M Transitway is a busway operated by the University of Minnesota between its Minneapolis and St. Paul campuses. The Transitway is primarily used by the #121 Campus Connector route of the U of M Campus Shuttle, with additional seasonal services for the Minnesota State Fair and Minnesota Golden Gophers athletic events. The Transitway opened in 1992 as part of a project to ease parking demand on the Minneapolis campus.

The Transitway is 2.6 mi (4.2 km) long, with no intermediate stations. Its intersections are equipped with signal priority, and buses often run nonstop along the entire line. Bicyclists and emergency vehicles are also permitted in the Transitway, and a shared-use path runs parallel to the western half of the line.

== Route and services ==
The Transitway runs between the University of Minnesota's East Bank and St. Paul campuses, running parallel to rail lines at some points. Stations are located at either end of the Transitway, and regular service continues past the Transitway in both directions. The Transitway has no intermediate stations, and buses travel at speeds of up to 40 mph (64 km/h). The Transitway is partially grade-separated, with 3 dedicated bridges and 7 at-grade intersections.

The primary service on the Transitway is the #121 Campus Connector route of the University of Minnesota Campus Shuttle. The Campus Connector operates year-round between the university's West Bank campus and the St. Paul Student Center, via the Transitway and Washington Ave SE.

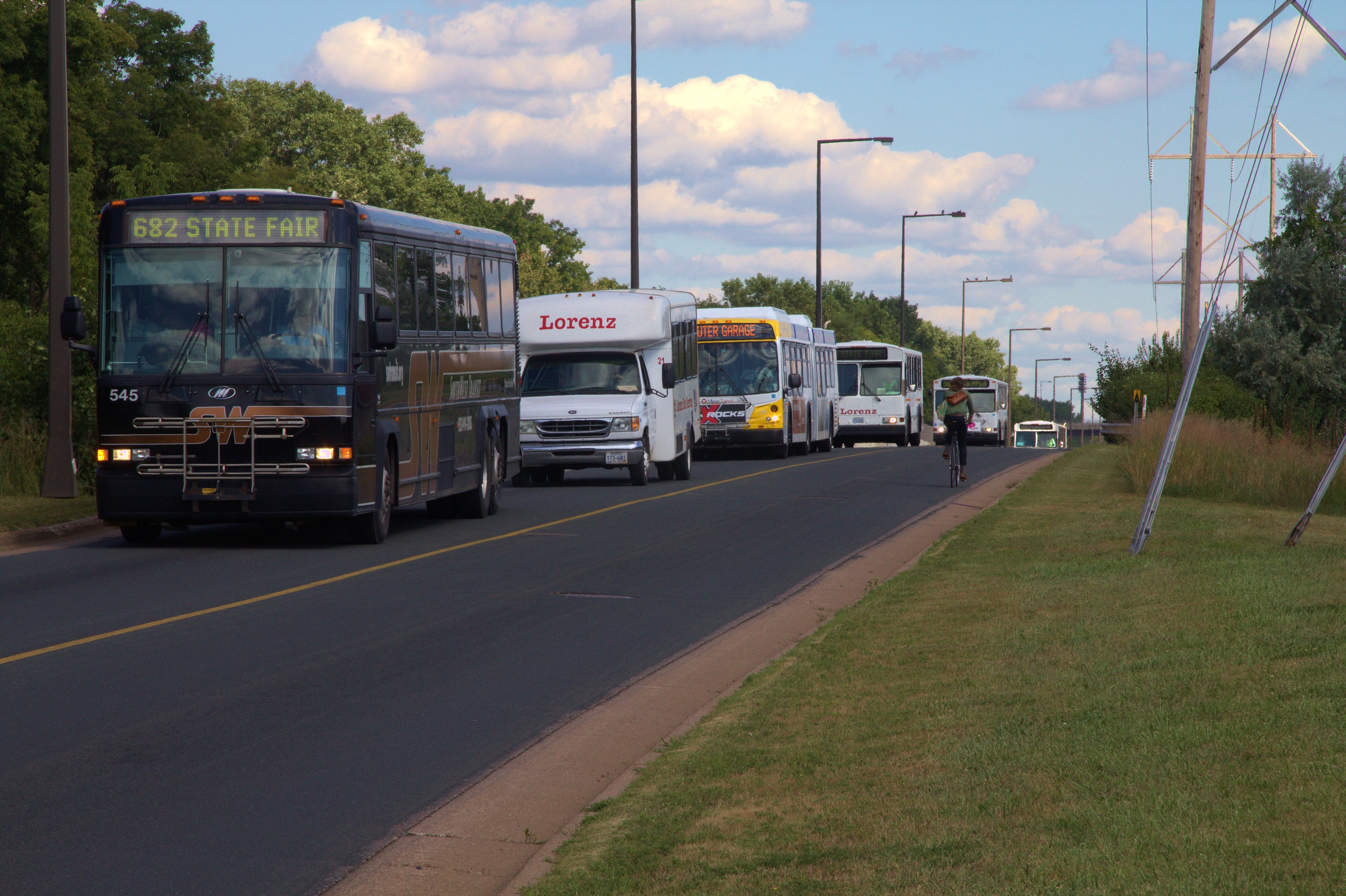
State Fair shuttle buses and a bicyclist on the Transitway in 2011

The Transitway's eastern terminus is adjacent to the Minnesota State Fairgrounds, and it sees heavy use by shuttle buses during the annual State Fair. The Transitway is a major component of the State Fair's large park-and-ride shuttle operation, which transported over 1.8 million passengers in 12 days for the 2023 fair season. Metro Transit, SouthWest Transit and the Minnesota Valley Transit Authority operate express services to park-and-ride lots in the suburbs, and the State Fair contracts private operators to provide service to lots close to the fairgrounds. The Transitway is also open to charter buses during the State Fair.

== History ==
Plans for a system of park-and-ride lots on the Saint Paul and Minneapolis campuses were first introduced in 1976. The project was delayed due to St. Anthony Park neighborhood concerns, required land purchases, University budgets and federal transportation requirements. U.S. Representative Martin Olav Sabo pushed through $2.8 million for the transitway in the 1987 House appropriations bill. The final project was approved in 1990 and included three park and ride lots, two in Minneapolis and one in Saint Paul. The project added 2,400 parking spaces to the Minneapolis campus, at a total cost of $21 million, equivalent to $48 million in 2023. $1.2 million in funding was provided by MnDOT, with $6.4 million from the University and $13.5 million in federal money from the Interstate Substitution Funds. The busway opened in 1992.

The western end of the transitway was cut back about 1/4 mile (0.40 km) in 2008 in order to make way for the new TCF Bank Stadium. Previously, it had run all the way to Oak Street in front of Mariucci Arena. This process also removed two stops on the western end of the transitway where there had previously been parking lots. Northbound Campus Connectors loop north around the stadium on 6th Street and Oak Street, while southbound buses use Oak Street to University Avenue before turning right onto 26th Avenue. The western stops were eliminated, while the eastern stops were moved to the entrance of the transitway. Stops at the eastern end of the transitway at Commonwealth Avenue were not affected.

== Safety ==
Following the opening of the Transitway in 1992, crash rates on Campus Connector buses increased dramatically. The Transitway opened with 7 at-grade intersections, of which only 2 were equipped with traffic signals to stop traffic. The remaining grade crossings were located at infrequently-used side streets, and were equipped only with stop signs.

A 1996 study of Transitway stop-sign intersections found that 20% of the drivers of vehicles crossing the Transitway were not looking both ways, and 50% were not fully stopping. In response, the university added more signage to Transitway intersections, and installed warning devices that alerted cross traffic when a bus was due to approach the intersection. Additionally, sight lines were improved at the intersections by trimming brush and removing street parking.

Despite these improvements, crashes continue to occur. In 2011, a truck failed to stop at a Transitway intersection, colliding with a bus and injuring 4 people.
