= Banker's mark =

Type of mark found on ancient Roman coins

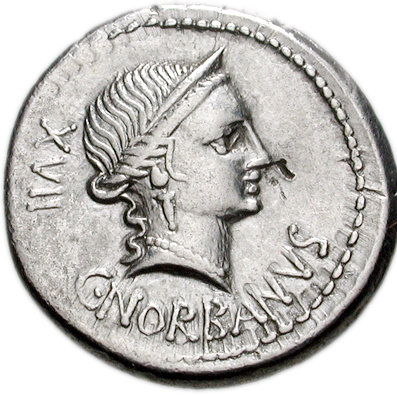
Denarius of 83 BCE, depicting Venus, with a banker's mark next to the tip of her nose

A banker's mark (or bankers' mark) is a symbol or letter stamped or scratched into many republican and early imperial Roman coins, whose exact purpose is unclear.

The marks are found on either the obverse or reverse of a coin.

Historians and numismatists have speculated that the marks may have been used to assess the purity of a coin's silver, demonstrate that it was not a plated forgery, for accounting or auditing purposes, or to denote that the coin did or did not have the specified weight.

There is also debate as to why these marks stopped appearing after very early imperial Roman coinage.

Research on coins found in the Netherlands has shown that four types of marks exist: punch marks, symbols, single letters, and letter combinations. This diversity in mark types suggests that no single explanation suffices. Rather, a combination of purposes (validation, custody, identification, or administrative accountability) is more likely. The marked coins can therefore be placed within a broader military and administrative context of coin circulation, rather than interpreting them solely as metal tests or banker's marks.

== See also ==
- Countermark
- Mason's mark
- Merchant's mark
- Mint mark
- Mintmaster mark
- Privy mark
- Roman graffiti
