= Phone bank =

Phone bank or phone banking may refer to:

- A collection of telephones within an organization or event such as a call centre or telethon
- A banking institution that does business solely or mostly via telephone. See telephone banking.
- A political campaign strategy to collect voter data and get out the vote. See canvassing.
