= Bankers' bank =

A bankers' bank is a financial institution that provides financial services to community banks in the United States. Bankers' banks offer services only to community banks, not to the general public, and are typically owned by some of their customers. The principal service that they provide is correspondence, the management of payment balances with other banks. By aggregating the transactions of their client banks, bankers' banks are able to realize economies of scale that enable their clients to do business alongside larger banks.

The present system of bankers' banks developed in the 1970s–80s, when independent banks found that their correspondent banks no longer provided a satisfactory level of service and in some cases competed against them. The first institution organized exclusively as a bankers' bank was United Bankers' Bank, formed in Minnesota in 1975. As of 2023, there are 12 bankers' banks across the US. The largest of these is TIB (The Independent BankersBank), which corresponds on behalf of 1,400 customer banks.

== See also ==
- Bank
- Corporate credit union
- Credit union
