= North Bank =

North Bank or Northbank may refer to:

== Places ==
=== United States ===
- Northbank (Jacksonville), a financial district in Jacksonville, Florida
- North Bank Highway
- Spokane, Portland and Seattle Railway, alternatively named The North Bank Road, with a train named North Bank Limited
  - North Bank Depot Buildings, Portland, Oregon

=== United Kingdom ===
- Thames Embankment, London
- The North Bank, a stand in Arsenal FC's home ground Highbury Stadium
- Northbank, a business improvement district in London, focused on The Strand

=== Australia ===
- Northbank (Brisbane), a commercial development
- Northbank Plaza, an office tower in Brisbane
- WTC Northbank Wharf

=== Other places ===
- North Bank tunnel, New Zealand
- North Bank Division, an administrative division of the Gambia
