= Banks Township =

Banks Township is the name of a few townships in the United States:

- Banks Township, Fayette County, Iowa
- Banks Township, Michigan
- Banks Township, Carbon County, Pennsylvania
- Banks Township, Indiana County, Pennsylvania
