= East Bank station =

Light rail station in Minneapolis, Minnesota

East Bank
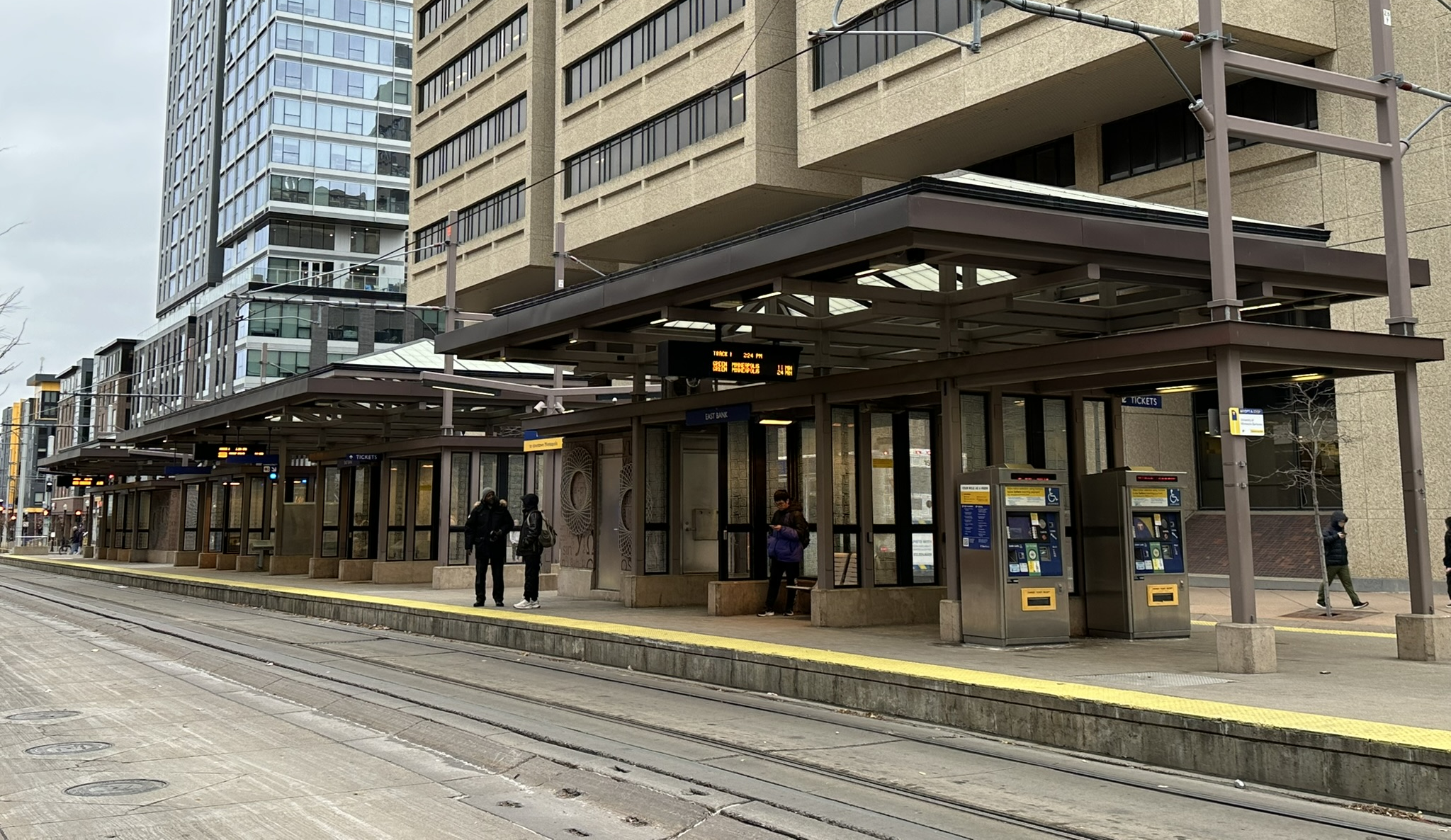
- East Bank station platform

General information
- Location: 551 Washington Avenue; Minneapolis, Minnesota
- Coordinates: 44°58′25″N 93°13′51″W
- Owner: Metro Transit
- Platforms: 1 island platform
- Tracks: 2
- Connections: Metro Transit: 2

Construction
- Structure type: At-grade
- Cycle facilities: Racks
- Accessible: Yes

History
- Opened: June 14, 2014

Passengers
- 2025: 3,366 daily ▼0.3%
- Rank: 1 out of 37

Services
Preceding station	Metro	Following station
West Bank toward Target Field	Green Line	Stadium Village toward Saint Paul Union Depot
Location

East Bank station is a light rail station along the Green Line in Minneapolis, Minnesota, located on Washington Avenue on the East Bank campus of the University of Minnesota. It is located between Union Street and Harvard Street. This is south of the Transportation and Safety Building and north of Moos Tower and Weaver-Densford Hall.

Washington Avenue on the East Bank was converted into a transit mall when the light-rail line was being built. Construction began in the area in May 2011, and the station opened along with the rest of the line in 2014.

As of 2025, the station received the highest average weekday ridership of any Metro Transit light rail station.
