= Embankment =

Embankment may refer to:

== Geology and geography ==
- A levee, an artificial bank raised above the immediately surrounding land to redirect or prevent flooding by a river, lake or sea
- Embankment (earthworks), a raised bank to carry a road, railway, or canal across a low-lying or wet area
- Embankment dam, a dam made of mounded earth and rock
- Land reclamation along river banks, usually marked by roads and walkways running along it, parallel to the river, as in:
  - The Thames Embankment along the north side of the Thames River in London, England
    - The Victoria Embankment contained within the Thames Embankments
    - The Chelsea Embankment contained within the Thames Embankment
  - The Albert Embankment along the south side of the Thames River in London, England
  - The Embanking of the tidal Thames, a centuries-long process carried out largely by uncoordinated local initiative.
  - The Neva embankments along the Neva River in Saint Petersburg, Russia
- Embankment tube station, a station on the London Underground

== Arts ==
- "Embankment", a work by artist Rachel Whiteread
