= Promysel Narimanova =

- Location within Azerbaijan
- Coordinates: 39°26′N 49°09′E
- Country: Azerbaijan
- Rayon: Neftchala
- Time zone: UTC+4 (AZT)
  - Summer (DST): UTC+5 (AZT)

Promysel Narimanova (also, Bank, Bankovski-Promysl, Bozhiy Promysel, Bozhly Promysel, Imeni Narimanova, and Promysel imeni Narimanova) is a village in the Neftchala Rayon of Azerbaijan.
