= Metro Transit (Minnesota) =

Public transit operator in the Twin Cities region of Minnesota

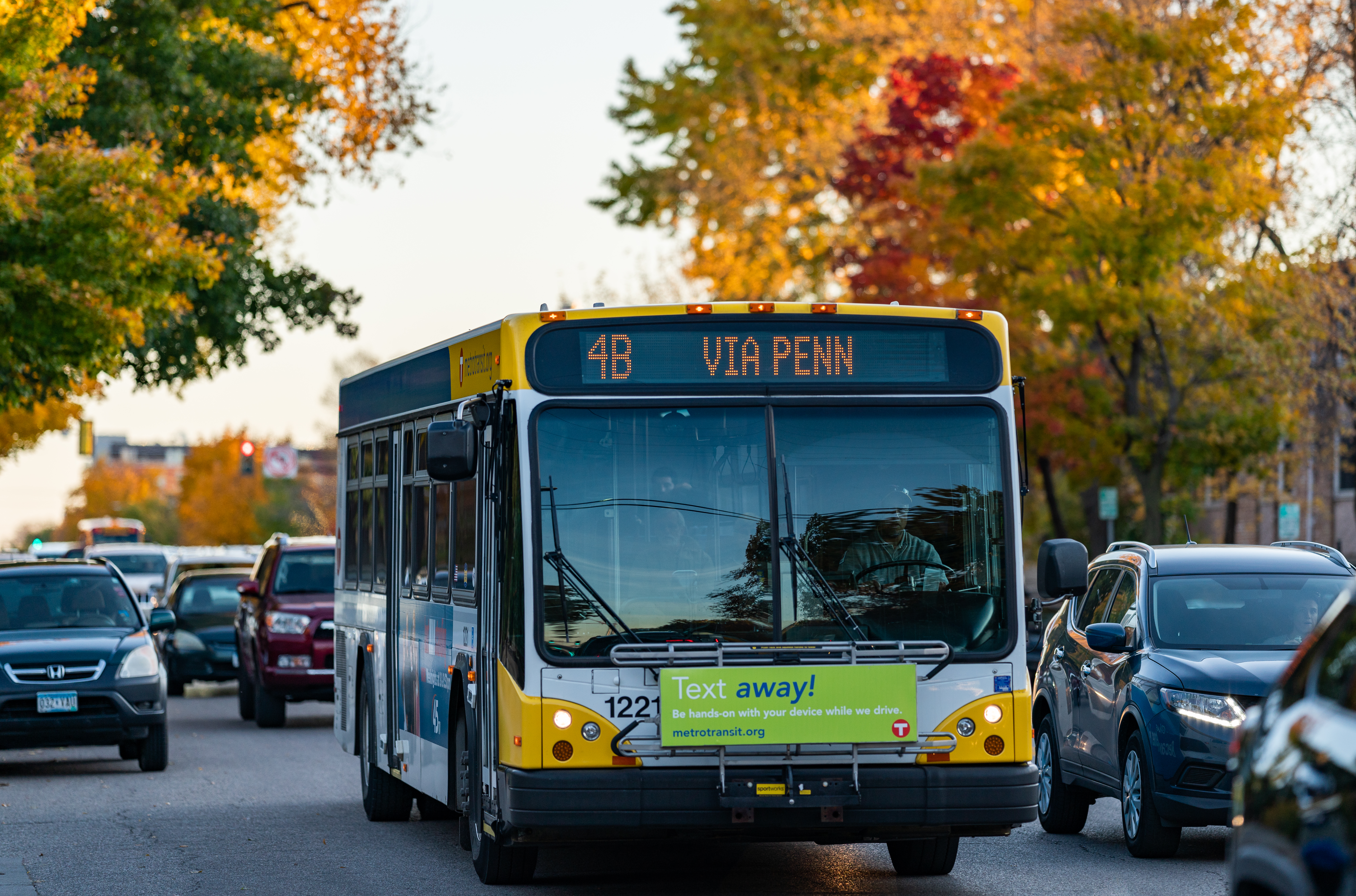
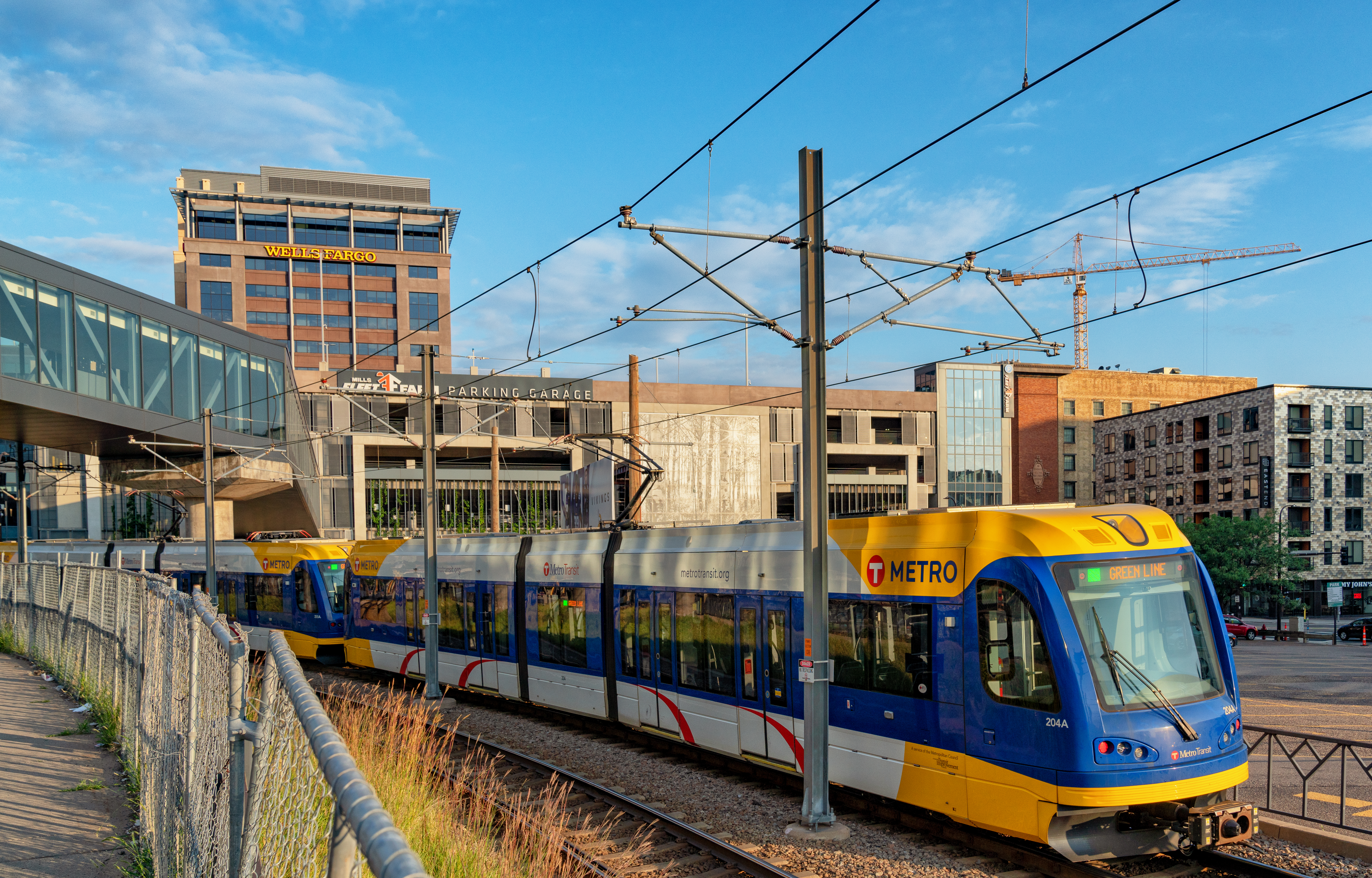
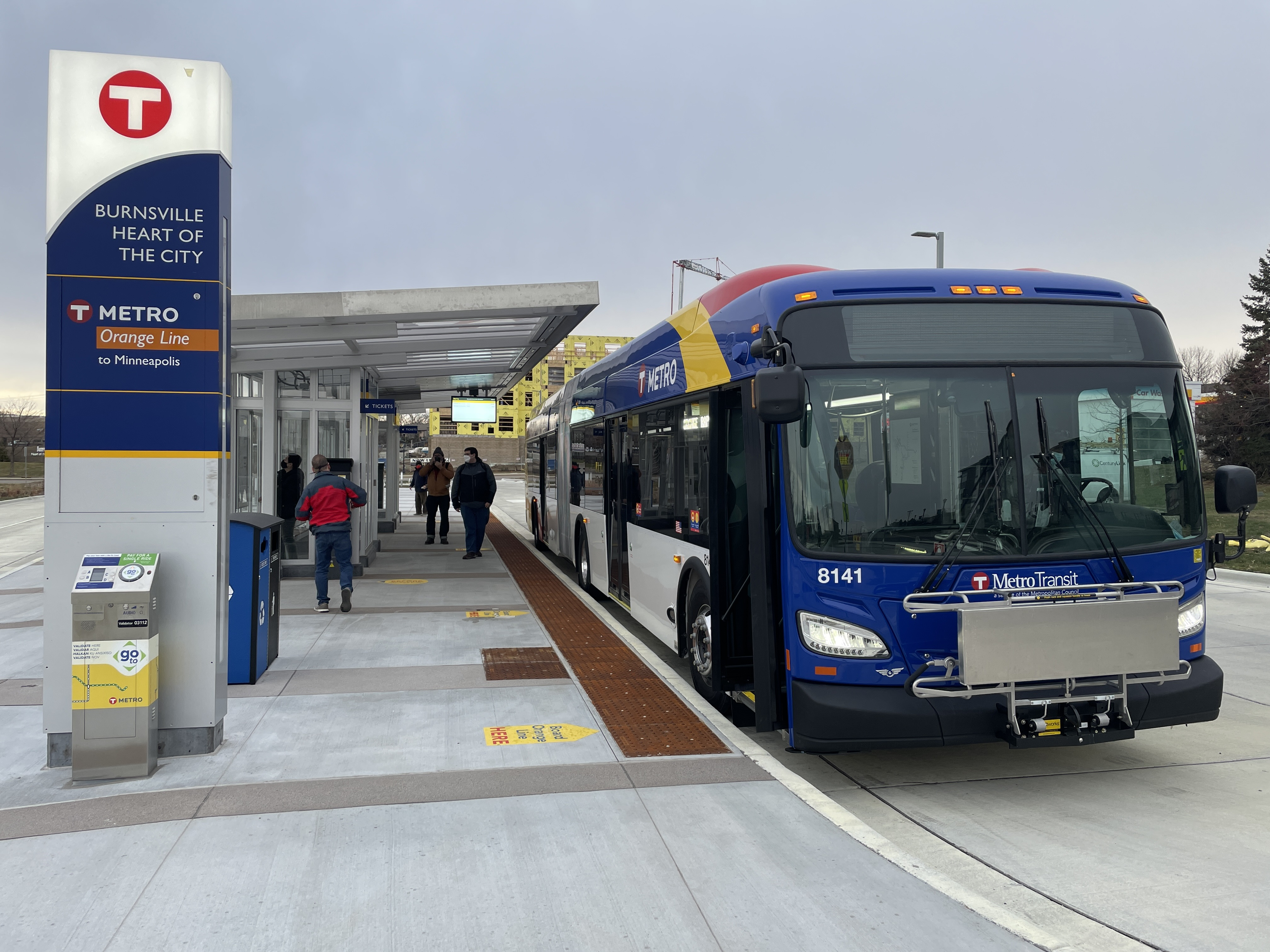
- Metro Transit services: local bus, light rail, and bus rapid transit

Overview
- Owner: Metropolitan Council
- Locale: Minneapolis–Saint Paul
- Transit type: Transit bus; Bus rapid transit; Light rail; Paratransit
- Number of lines: 125 routes: 37 urban local; 71 express; 9 suburban local; 2 light rail transit; 7 bus rapid transit
- Number of stations: 37 light rail 99 bus rapid transit
- Daily ridership: 162,300 (weekdays, Q2 2026)
- Annual ridership: 45,151,500 (2025)
- Chief executive: Lesley Kandaras
- Headquarters: Fred T. Heywood Office Building and Garage; 560 North Sixth Avenue; Minneapolis, Minnesota, United States
- Website: metrotransit.org

Operation
- Began operation: May 20, 1967 (established); September 18, 1970 (bus operations); June 26, 2004 (light rail); June 11, 2016 (bus rapid transit)
- Number of vehicles: 916 buses: 529 diesel buses; 114 hybrid-electric buses; 8 electric buses; 201 articulated buses; 64 coach buses; 115 rail vehicles: 91 light rail vehicles

Metro Transit is the primary public transportation operator in the Minneapolis–Saint Paul area of the U.S. state of Minnesota and the largest operator in the state. In 2025, the system had a ridership of 45,151,500, or about 162,300 per weekday as of the second quarter of 2026.

The system is a division of the Metropolitan Council, the region's metropolitan planning organization (MPO), carrying 90% to 95% of the transit riders in the region on a combined network of regular-route buses and light rail. The remainder of Twin Cities transit ridership is generally split among suburban "opt-out" carriers operating out of cities that have chosen not to participate in the Metro Transit network. The biggest opt-out providers are Minnesota Valley Transit Authority (MVTA), Maple Grove Transit and Southwest Transit (SW Transit). The University of Minnesota also operates a campus shuttle system that coordinates routes with Metro Transit services. It is considered to be one of the fastest growing mass transit networks in the US.

In 2017, buses carried about 68% of the system's passengers. Just above 16% of ridership was concentrated on Metro Transit's busiest route, the Green Line light rail. The region's other light rail line, the Blue Line, fell close behind, carrying 13% of Metro Transit passengers. Nearly 2% rode the A Line arterial rapid bus line. The remaining approximately 1% rode the former Northstar Line service. In 2015, Metro Transit saw its highest yearly ridership ever, with a total of 85.8 million trips, 62.1 million (72%) of which were on buses. The remaining 23.7 million (28%) of passengers traveled on the region's rail lines, including the then new Green Line. The single-day ridership record is 369,626, set on September 1, 2016.

Metro Transit drivers and vehicle maintenance personnel are organized through the Amalgamated Transit Union. The agency also contracts with private providers, such as First Transit, to offer paratransit services which operate under the Metro Mobility brand.

== History ==
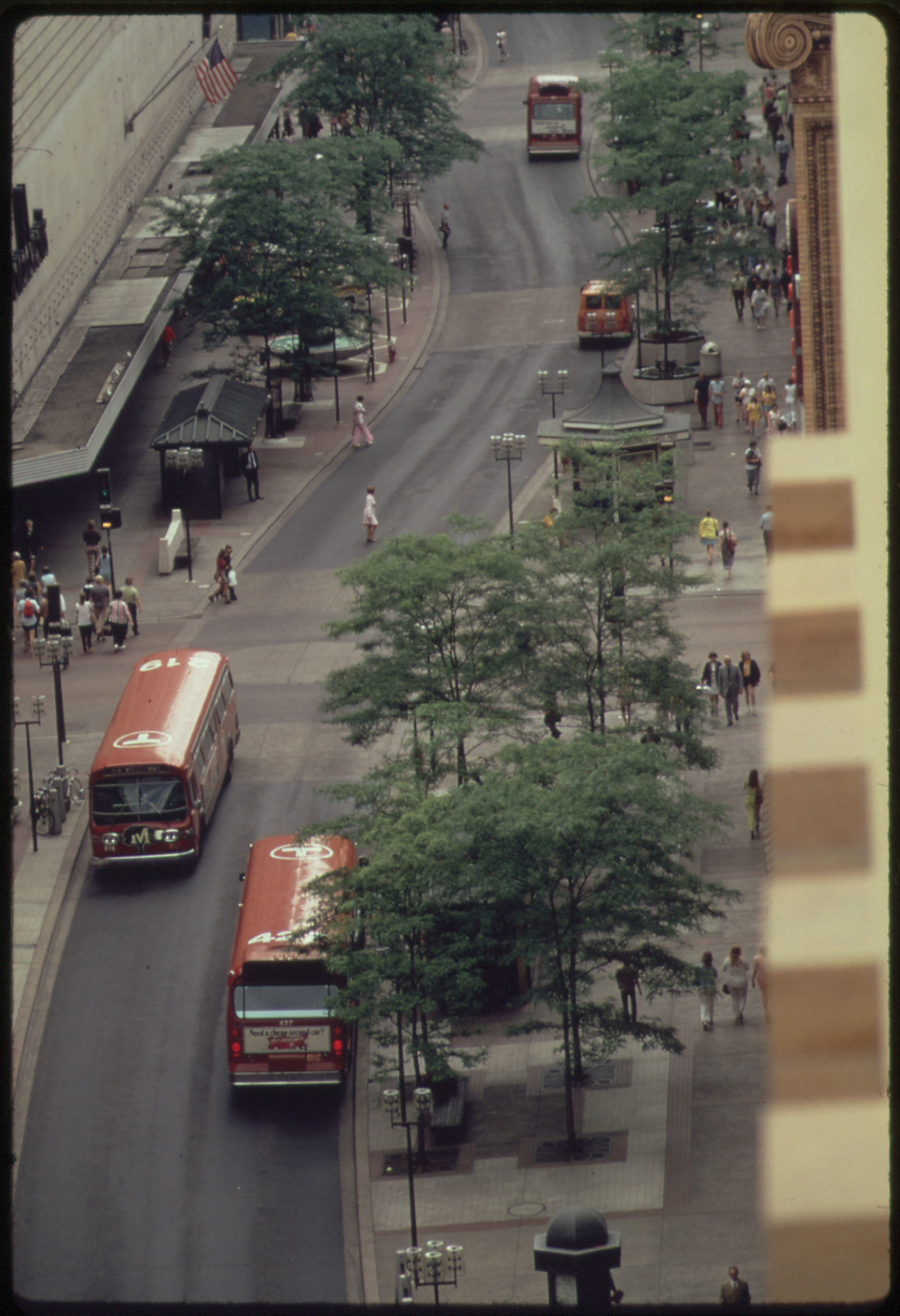
Buses on Nicollet Mall, June 1973

The agency was established by the Minnesota State Legislature in 1967 as the Metropolitan Transit Commission (MTC), with the purpose of overseeing transit planning and improvements for the region. The idea for such an agency was first floated in 1950 and gained momentum at the Legislature in 1965 when it was supported by two separate studies. The Twin Cities' primary transit operator, Twin City Lines traces its history back to the first horsecar lines in the late 19th-century. In the eclipse of public takeover, Twin City Lines had 635 buses: 75% of those were over 15 years old and 86 buses were so old that they were banned in Minneapolis. The public complained that Twin City Lines buses were too slow, uncomfortable, and lacked connection with the other seven private suburban bus companies. The 64th Legislature failed to pass the establishment of a transit commission with regulatory, planning, and other powers in 1965. The 65th Legislature established MTC two years later after overwhelming support from 23 cities and Twin City Lines itself. Originally, the bill also would have provided MTC the authority to acquire private bus companies though condemnation, but was removed after lobbying from Twin City Lines. MTC composed of nine members, eight appointed by local governments and a chair appointed by the governor. The iconic "Circle T" came into use shortly after its creation, becoming a regionally recognizable symbol today.

With the new commission lacking expertise themselves, MTC retained two transit consulting firms. Simpson & Curtin were hired to analyze the current transit network and recommend improvements. Alan M. Voorhees & Associates took on the role of developing a long-range transit plan, including rapid transit. MTC had been involved in talks with Twin City Lines about purchasing them since fall 1968. MTC was reluctant to negotiate, since they did not have condemnation powers; while Twin City Lines was also reluctant because they did not want to be condemned. In October 1969 Simpson & Curtain, over two other alternatives, recommended public ownership of Twin City Lines, ridiculing them for "a record of long-term neglect". The other alternatives were to subside the bus company or jawboning the company to make improvements. On September 18, 1970, MTC acquired the dilapidated Twin City Lines bus system from businessman Carl Pohlad after mounting pressure for public ownership. At 5 am that morning, buses rolled out with "Circle T" decals applied to old buses over the night, with a long-term rebranding effort ahead. From Simpson & Curtain, MTC already had a 13-point bus improvement plan, and had gained federal commitment of $9.7 million to help fund the acquisition and the first phase of the plan. MTC established a five year, $20 million program to modernize the system: kicking off the first year purchasing 93 new buses, building 135 new bus shelters, installing new bus stop signs, and the creation of a 24-hour information center. By 1975, MTC had acquired four private suburban companies, introduced 665 new buses to the fleet, and created the first highway express bus.

Shortly after the acquisition of Twin City Lines, a long battle began to return rail transit to the region and efforts for additional lines continue at a snail's pace. It would take 32 years to see the first line implemented. In 1972, the Regional Fixed Guideway Study for MTC proposed a $1.3 billion 37- or 57-mile (sources differ) heavy rail rapid transit system, but the then-separate Metropolitan Council disagreed with that idea—refusing to even look at the plan—and continuing political battles prevented its implementation. The Met Council had its own plans for bus rapid transit in the Cities. Another system using smaller people movers was proposed in the 1975 Small Vehicle Fixed Guideway Study and gained the most traction with the Saint Paul city council, but was eventually dropped in 1980. In the 1980s, light rail was proposed as an alternative and several possible corridors were identified, including the Central Corridor, for which a draft environmental impact statement (DEIS) was drawn up in 1982.

In 1994, MTC became a division of the Metropolitan Council, prompting a name change to Metropolitan Council Transit Operations (MCTO). Realizing the new name was not embraced by the public, the agency rebranded itself in late 1997 to Metro Transit. The effort was to create a "new name for a new beginning" in a period where support for light rail transit was beginning to peak. In 1998, Hennepin County Commissioner and Hennepin County Regional Rail Authority chairman Peter McLaughlin and Congressman Martin Sabo respectively secured local and federal funding for the Hiawatha Line. A year later Governor Jesse Ventura was able to secure state funding. Light rail began operation on June 26, 2004, just over 50 years since the last regular-service streetcar ran on June 19, 1954, under Twin City Lines. Heavy-rail commuter service began on November 14, 2009, with the Northstar Line, and ended on January 4, 2026 with the last Northstar train.

Metro Transit does not cover the whole Twin Cities area. Bus service in the suburbs was being cut back in the early 1980s and suburb-to-suburb service was limited (an issue that remains today). In 1986, cities and counties in the seven-county metropolitan area were given the option to run their own bus services and leave the MTC system. About 17.5% of the area which has regular route transit service is served by these six other "opt out" transit systems. About 5% of the system is contracted to private transit providers.

== Funding ==
Metro Transit currently receives the majority of its funding from the State Motor Vehicle Sales Tax, the State General Fund, fares and federal revenues. Metro Transit prepares an annual calendar budget, but most of its funding comes from state funds, on a July 1 biennial budget. Between 2001 and 2006, reductions in state general funds and state motor vehicle sales tax collections forced a set of service cuts, fare increases and fuel surcharges, all of which reduced ridership.

Local policy requires that one third of the system's funding is to come from fares and current operations slightly exceed that level. Since October 1, 2008, fares on all buses and trains increased by 25 cents. Express routes cost more (on limited-stop portions) and certain eligible individuals (such as riders with disabilities) may ride for $1. Many of the fares used to be more expensive during rush hour periods. For instance, a rush-hour ride on an express bus used to cost $3.25, as opposed to $2.50 for non-rush hours. In 2024, Metro Transit announced that they would be eliminating the rush-hour fare in an attempt to make the fare system more simplistic. This change took effect on January 1, 2025.

The system does not make much use of fare zones aside from downtown zones in Minneapolis and St. Paul, where rides only cost $0.50. Fare transfer cards valid for 2.5 hours are available upon payment of fare. A number of discounted multiple-use transit pass options are available. In early 2007, the system introduced a contactless smart card (the Go-To card) for paying fares.

A second fare increase occurred in 2017. "Under the new system, local fares for off-peak hours will increase from $1.75 to $2; while rides will go from $2.25 to $2.50 for peak hours. Metro Mobility users will pay $3.50 to $4.50 per ride, as well as an additional 75-cent surcharge for trips greater than 15 miles. Transit Link Dial-A-Ride fares will increase, on average, by $1.60, and include a 75-cent distance surcharge."

== METRO System ==
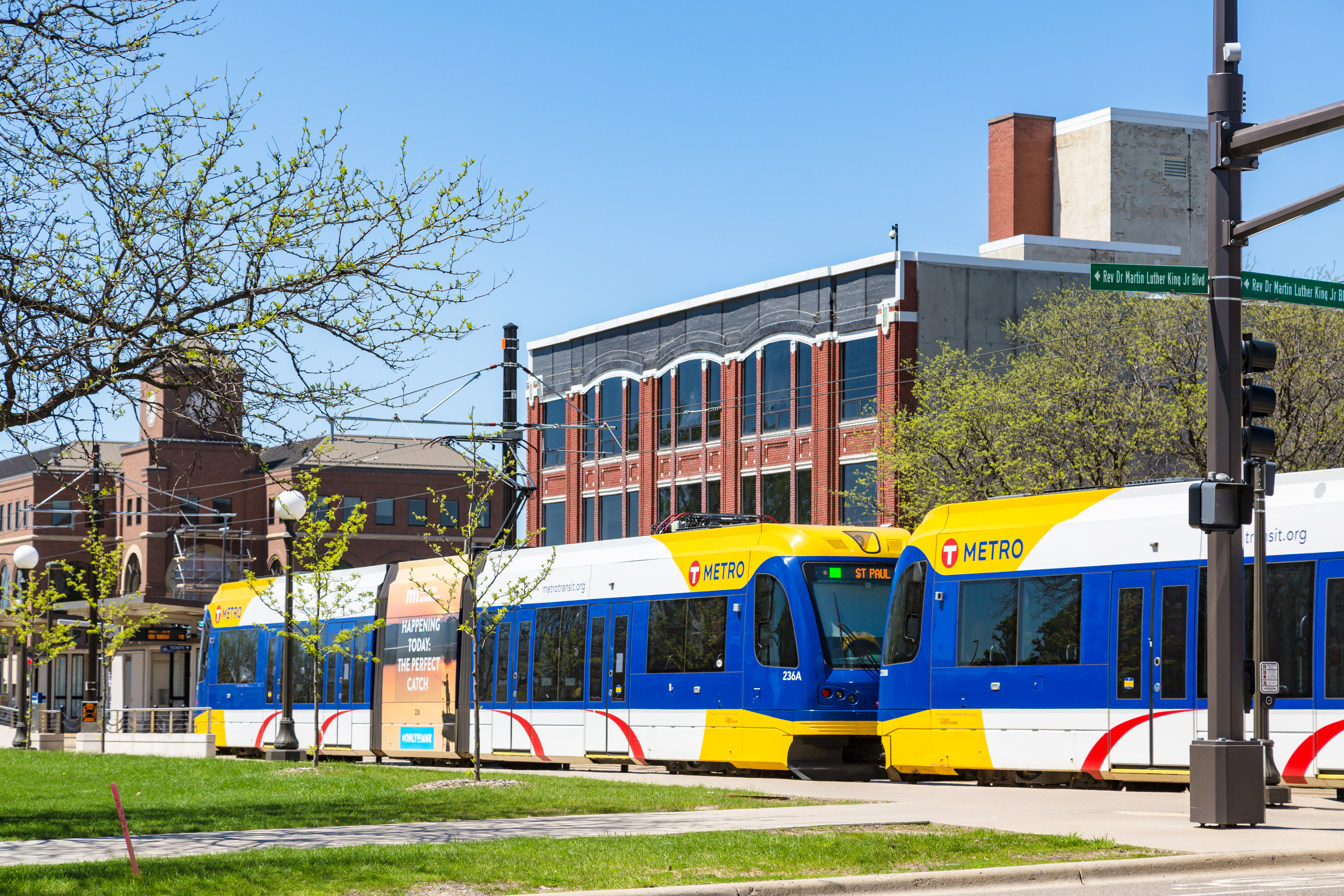
A Green Line light rail train on University Avenue next to the Minnesota State Capitol in Saint Paul.

Metro is the system of frequent, all-day light rail and bus rapid transit lines owned by the Metropolitan Council that provide station-to-station service to the Twin Cities region. Metro Transit is the operator of both of the region's light rail lines, the Metro Blue Line and the Metro Green Line, and the region's bus rapid transit lines: the Metro A Line, Metro B Line, Metro C Line, Metro D Line, Metro E Line, Metro Orange Line, Metro Red Line, and Metro Gold Line. An extension of the Metro Green Line is currently under construction.

=== Light rail ===
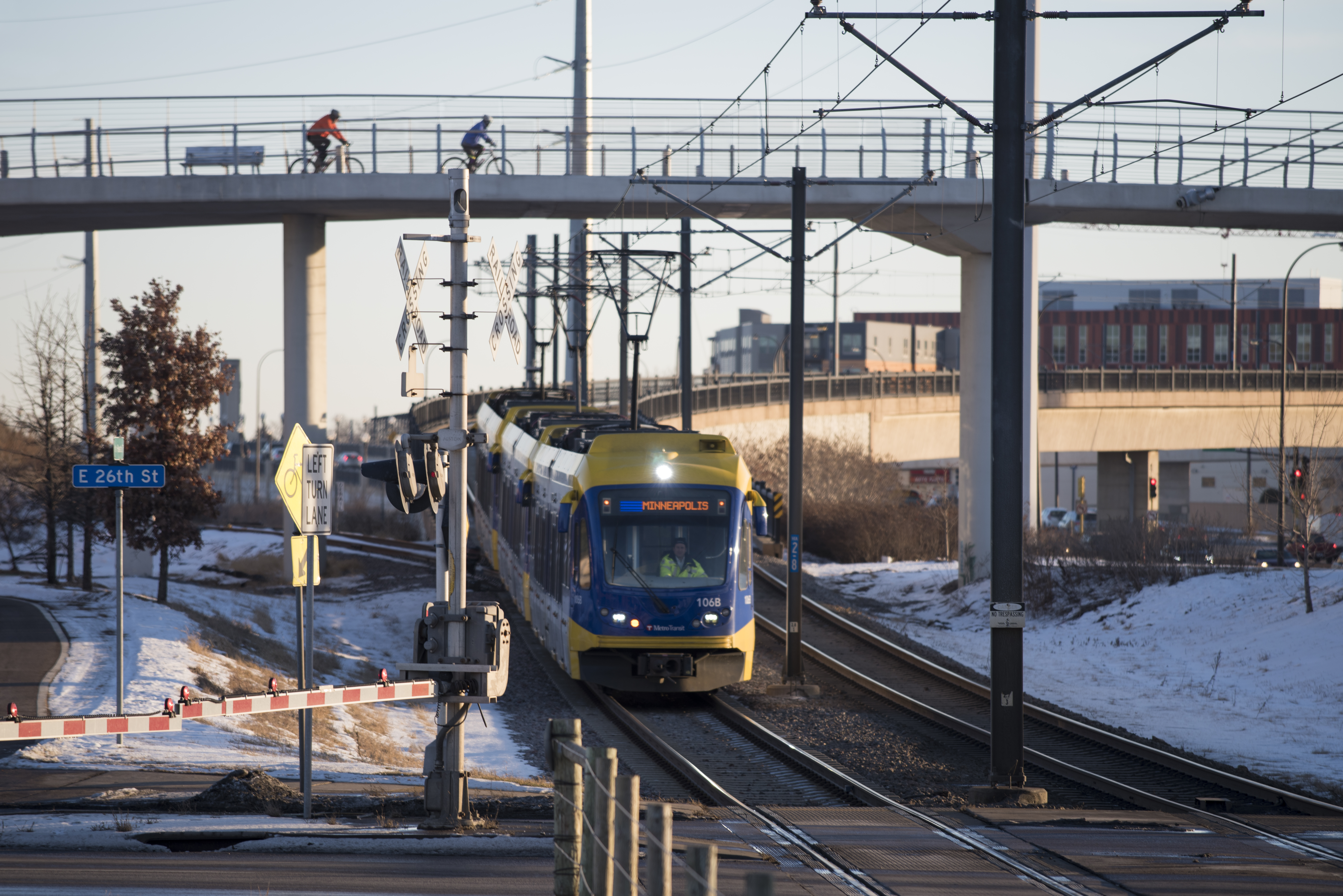
A Blue Line light rail train crossing under the Martin Olav Sabo Bridge (Hiawatha LRT Trail) near Highway 55

The METRO Blue Line opened on June 26, 2004, as the state's first light rail line, providing service between Hennepin Ave./Warehouse District Station and Fort Snelling station. On December 4, 2004, service was extended to Mall of America station via Minneapolis–St. Paul International Airport. As part of the Northstar Line project, on November 14, 2009, the Blue Line was extended a few blocks north to Target Field station to provide connections to the new commuter rail line. Current plans call for a northern extension of the Metro Blue Line to Brooklyn Park.

The METRO Green Line opened on June 14, 2014, and connects Downtown Minneapolis, the University of Minnesota, the Midway and Saint Anthony Park neighborhoods of St. Paul, the State Capitol and Downtown St. Paul with light rail service. The Metro Green Line Extension is a currently under construction extension of the Green Line through the southwest suburbs to Eden Prairie. On January 14, 2021, the Metropolitan Council announced that the Metro Green Line Extension would not be able to make its targeted opening year of 2023 due to poor soil conditions in the Kenilworth Corridor. The expected opening date was revised to 2027 the following year.

=== Arterial bus rapid transit ===
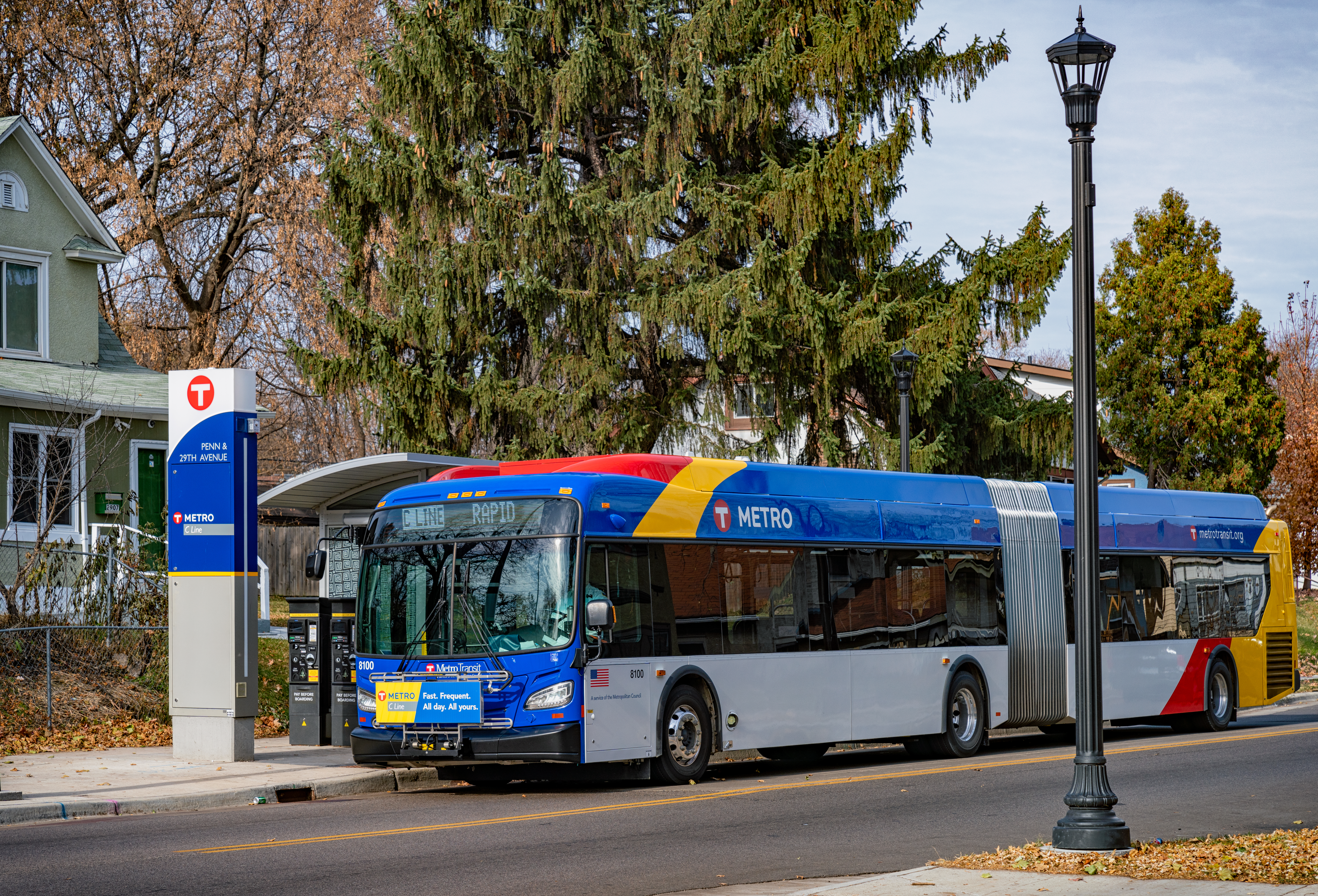
METRO C Line bus in Near North, Minneapolis

The METRO A Line is a bus rapid transit line that operates along Snelling Avenue and Ford Parkway. The A Line runs between 46th Street Station to the Rosedale Transit Center, with connections to the METRO Blue Line at 46th Street Station and the METRO Green Line Snelling Avenue station. The A Line was the first in a series of planned bus rapid transit lines that replace high ridership local routes. Service began on June 11, 2016.

The METRO B Line serves the Selby-Lake corridor, mostly following the route of the former 21 bus service. It runs between West Lake Station, west of Uptown in Minneapolis eastward to downtown Saint Paul. The line began operations on June 14, 2025.

The METRO C Line is a bus rapid transit line that operates along Penn Avenue and Olson Memorial Highway. The C Line connects Brooklyn Center, North Minneapolis, and Downtown Minneapolis. Service began on June 8, 2019.

The METRO D Line is a bus rapid transit line that operates along Fremont Avenue and Chicago Avenue. It connects Brooklyn Center, North Minneapolis, Downtown Minneapolis, South Minneapolis and Mall of America. Service began on December 3, 2022.

The METRO E Line is a bus rapid transit line that operates along Hennepin Avenue. It runs from the University of Minnesota through Downtown Minneapolis, Uptown Minneapolis, Southwest Minneapolis, and Edina to Southdale Center. Service began on December 6, 2025.

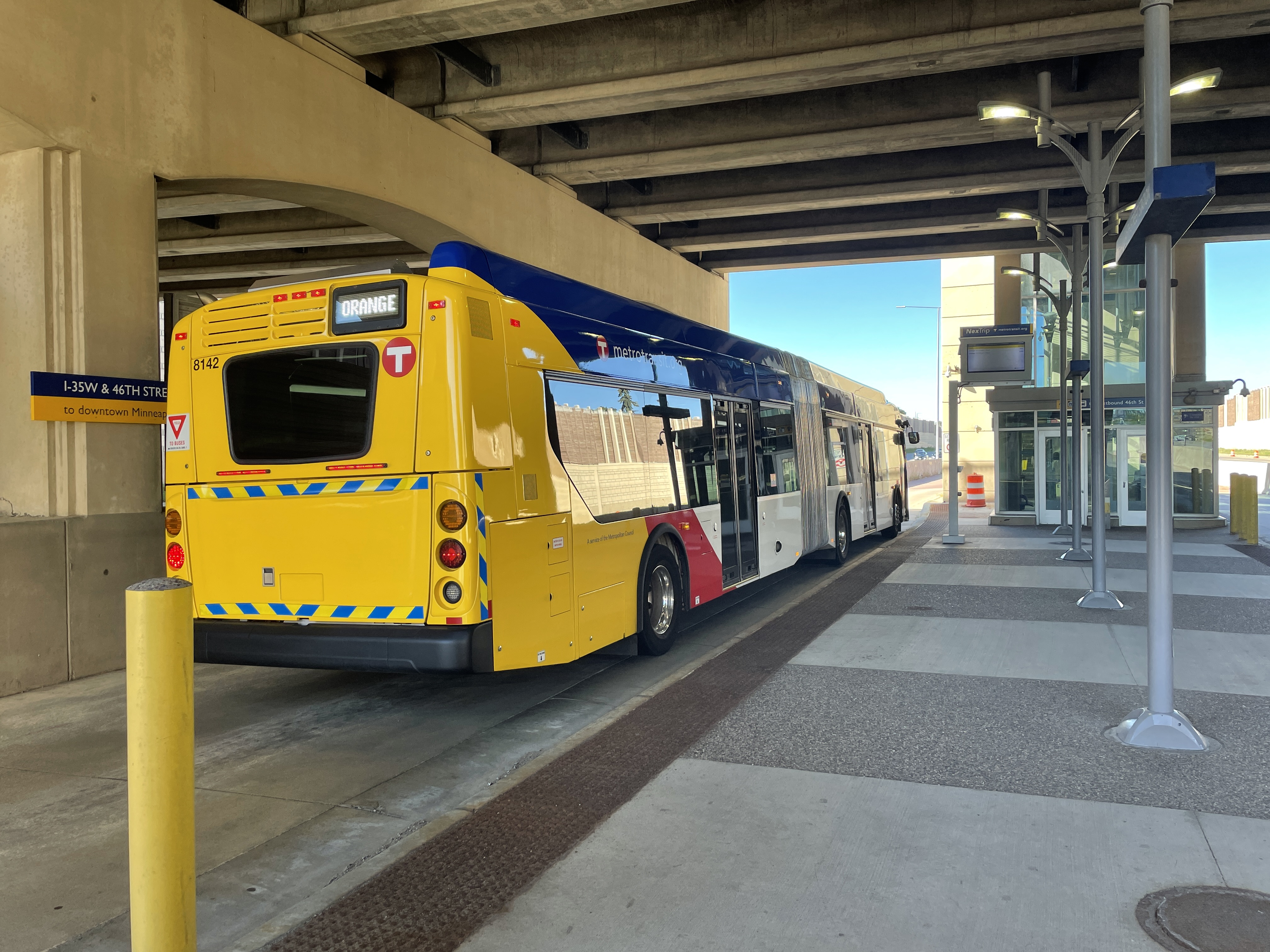
Orange Line bus at I-35W & 46th Street station, in the median of Interstate 35W

=== Highway bus rapid transit ===
The METRO Red Line is a bus rapid transit line providing connections between the Metro Blue Line at Mall of America and the southern suburb of Apple Valley. The line began service on June 22, 2013, operated by Minnesota Valley Transit Authority on behalf of the Metropolitan Council. On December 4, 2020, Metro Transit assumed all operations the Red Line.

The METRO Orange Line operates along Interstate 35W from Downtown Minneapolis to the southern suburbs, terminating in Burnsville. Transit improvements in the corridor had been discussed for decades before bus rapid transit was chosen as the preferred mode. The line began operations on December 4, 2021.

=== Bus rapid transit ===
The METRO Gold Line is a bus rapid transit line that runs from Downtown Saint Paul to Woodbury. It's the first bus rapid transit line in the state to have dedicated lanes with 90% of the route traveling in these lanes. Operations began on March 22, 2025. The Gold Line will be extended to Minneapolis in March 2027, replacing 94 express bus service running down I-94 between Minneapolis and Saint Paul.

== Transitway projects in development ==
=== Metro Bronze Line ===
The METRO Bronze Line, formerly the Purple Line, is a bus rapid transit line undergoing environmental analysis. The line will travel from downtown Saint Paul to White Bear Lake and 85-90% of the route will run on its own dedicated roads. The project would cost between $420-470 million and could open as soon as 2026.

=== Other corridors ===
In fall 2020 Metro Transit announced that they would be resuming community engagement and development of upgrading local routes to bus rapid transit lines as part of Network Next. Out of 11 corridors, three would be selected as to be upgraded after completion of the Metro E Line. All three lines would be constructed at once around 2024–2025 and would be part of the METRO network. In February 2021, it was announced that the corridors would be:

- F Line: Northtown Mall—Downtown Minneapolis via Central Avenue, currently served by Route 10.
- G Line: Little Canada Transit Center—Downtown Saint Paul—Dakota County Service Center via Rice and Robert Streets, currently served by Routes 62 and 68.
- H Line: Downtown Minneapolis—Sun Ray Transit Center via Como and Maryland Avenue, currently served by parts of Route 3, 64, and 80.

Seventeen candidate corridors were identified in Spring 2025 as potential BRT corridors. Of these, three would be selected to be upgraded in between 2030 and 2035 into bus rapid transit lines. In January 2026, it was announced that two of the selected corridors would be:

- J Line: Mall of America station—Downtown Saint Paul via West 7th Street, currently served by Route 54.
- K Line: Downtown Minneapolis—Bloomington via Nicollet Avenue, currently served by Route 18.

The Metro L Line was originally planned to be announced on the same day, but Metro Transit decided that an additional study would be needed, which would include answering questions about the feasiblity of the Franklin/Grand/3rd corridor alongside the Johnson/Lyndale South and Randolph/East 7th Street candidate corridors before identifying it later in 2026.

== Bus services ==
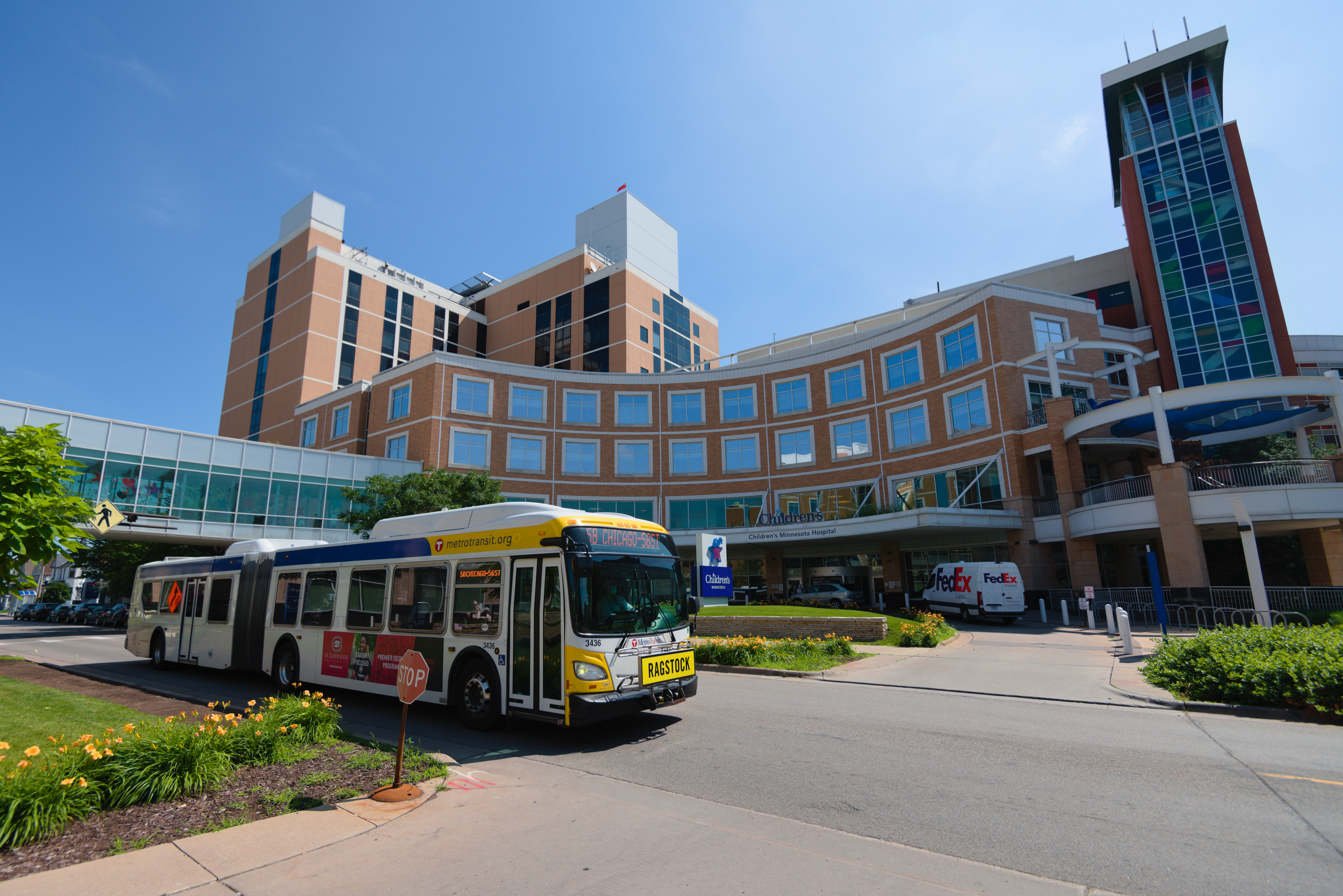
Metro Transit local bus at Children's Minnesota Hospital, Minneapolis

Metro Transit operates 123 bus routes, 66 of which are local routes and 51 are express routes. An additional six bus routes are operated under contract with Maple Grove Transit. In 2012, Metro Transit buses averaged 230,575 riders per weekday. The system operates almost 900 wait shelters, including 180 reclaimed from CBS Outdoor in March 2014.

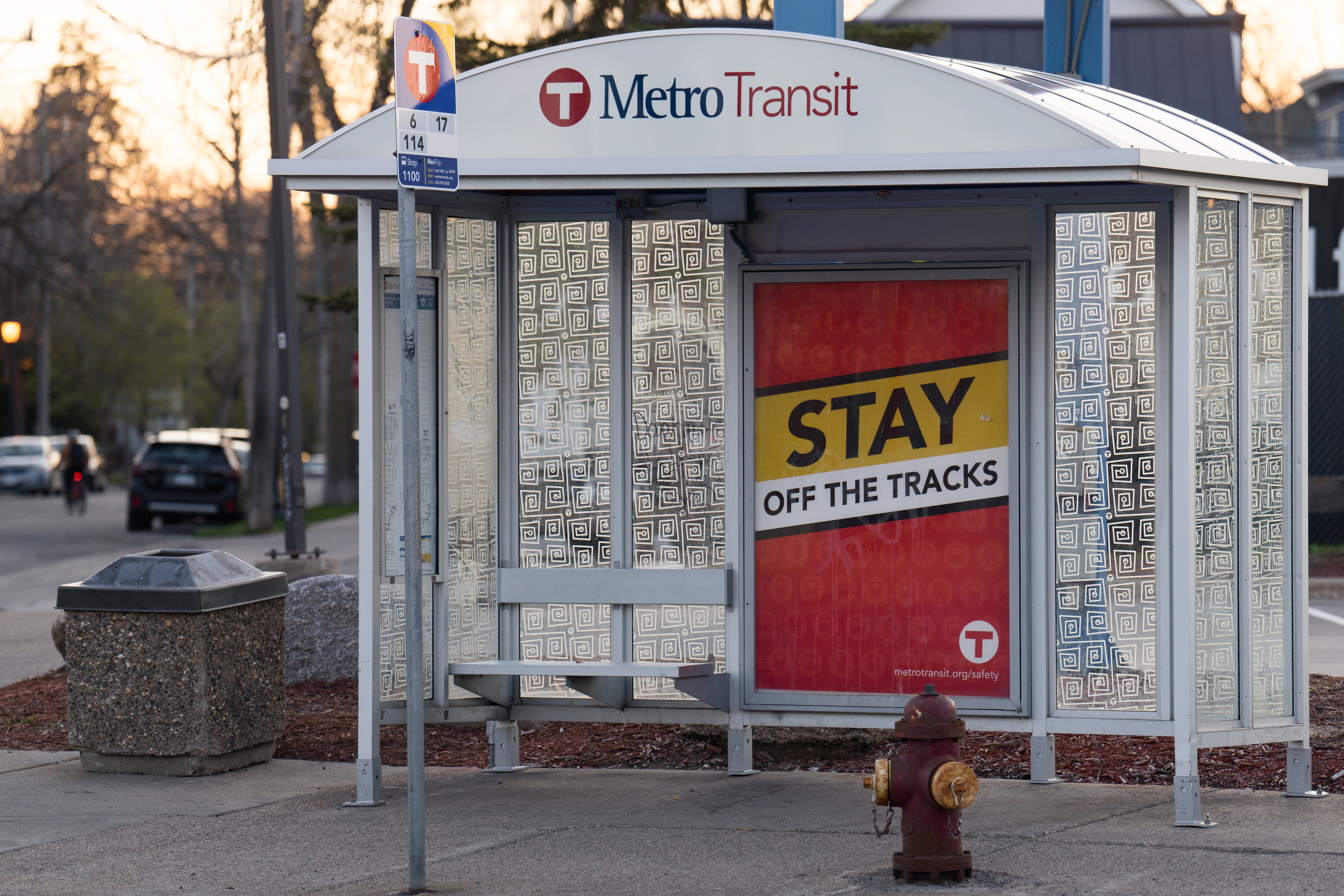
Metro Transit local bus stop on Hennepin Avenue

Bus routes are numbered in accordance to portions of the metropolitan area served. Bus routes that primarily serve Minneapolis are numbered 1–49, 50–59 are inner-city limited-stop routes, 60–89 primarily serve St. Paul, and route 94 is an express route that connects the core areas of Minneapolis and St. Paul via I-94. 100 series routes are primarily commuter routes connecting outlying neighborhoods of Minneapolis and St. Paul to the cities' cores, as well as the University of Minnesota. 200 series routes serve the northeast metro, 300 series the southeast, 400 series the southern Dakota and Scott County suburbs, 500 series the suburbs of Richfield, Edina, and Bloomington, 600 series the west and southwest metro, 700 series the northwest metro and 800 series serves northern Anoka County suburbs.

Three-digit route numbers are further subdivided into two groups. Routes ending in x00–x49 are typically local service bus routes connecting METRO stations, shopping areas and other local destinations, whereas those ending in x50–x99 are primarily express service routes which connect outlying suburbs and park and ride facilities to the central business districts of Minneapolis and St. Paul.

=== High Frequency Network ===
A sub-network branded as the High Frequency Network (originally spelled Hi-Frequency) was created on September 9, 2006. This network highlights sixteen routes that offer headways of 15 minutes or better during weekdays from 6 am to 7 pm and Saturdays from 9 am to 6 pm. As of December 2023, segments of Routes 2, 3, 6, 10, 11, 18, 54, 64 and all of Routes, 63, and METRO A, C, D, Blue, Orange, and Green Lines are part of the High Frequency Network. All of Route 16 and segments of Routes 5, 19 and 84 were formerly part of the network until being replaced by METRO lines in the same corridor. As of June 2025, the High Frequency Network is no longer referenced on Metro Transit's maps or its website.

== Northstar Line ==
The Northstar Line was a commuter rail line providing service between Minneapolis and Big Lake, Minnesota, which opened on November 16, 2009. There were additional bus connections to Becker and St. Cloud, with three round-trips in the peak direction, one reverse commute round-trip on weekdays, and no weekend service. Additional service was provided on event days, such as during Twins and Vikings games. However, service was not provided on holidays. In August 2025, the agency announced the discontinuation of the line in favor of bus service, the last day of services is planned for January 2026. The last trains on the line ran on January 4, 2026, serving a Vikings–Packers game, with replacement bus service commencing on January 5, 2026.

== Facilities ==
=== Dedicated bus lanes ===
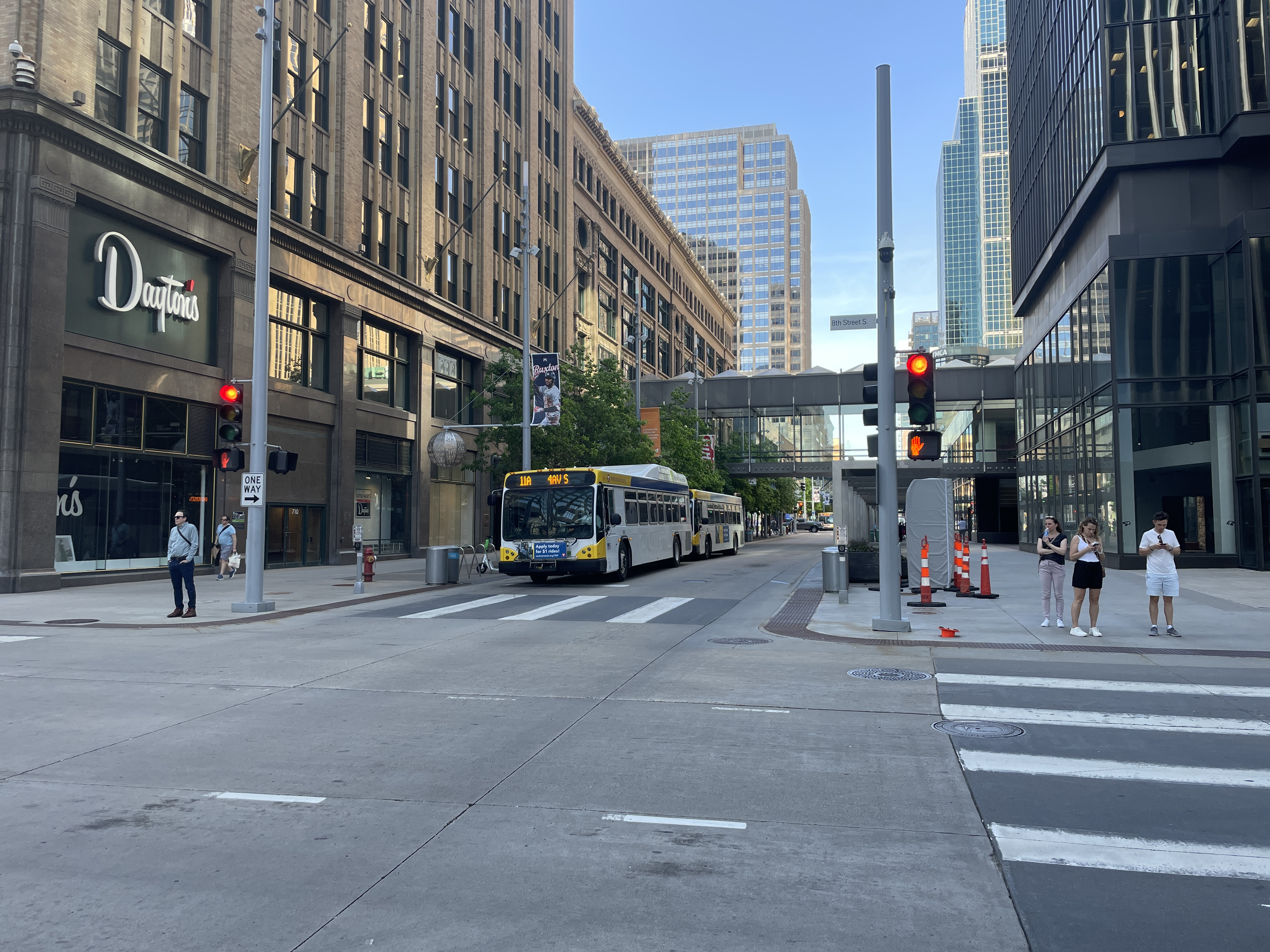
Nicollet Mall in 2024

Several local transit routes travel along a dedicated transit mall in downtown Minneapolis. Nicollet Mall runs roughly south to north through downtown. An experiment to move buses off of Nicollet Mall to Hennepin Avenue in the afternoon rush hour occurred in 2005 and the results attracted mixed reviews. In 2007, 964 buses travelled through Nicollet Mall every day serving both local and express customers.

Some express routes used to travel along Nicollet Mall but starting in 2009, most express routes in downtown Minneapolis moved to the paired streets of Marquette Avenue and 2nd Avenue South on the Marq2 transit corridor. The $32 million dollar project was partly funded by the federal government under the Urban Partnership Agreement. The two-lane busways were built along the parallel roads which each travel one-way in opposite directions. The two lanes allow buses to stop at the curb to pick up customers and pass other buses in the second lane. A system of lettered gates was established, by which buses would only stop every other block along those two one-mile corridors. Some trip travel times were reduced by 10 minutes after 1,400 trips were consolidated in the corridor. NexTrip digital signs with arrival times were also added, although they weren't functioning at the beginning of the rollout. NexTrip information has also been available through the Metro Transit website since 2008 and can be accessed with mobile web browsers. After 10 years NexTrip signs on Marquette and 2nd Avenues were upgraded with new versions that have improved connectivity, better reliability, and improved NexTrip travel time predictions.

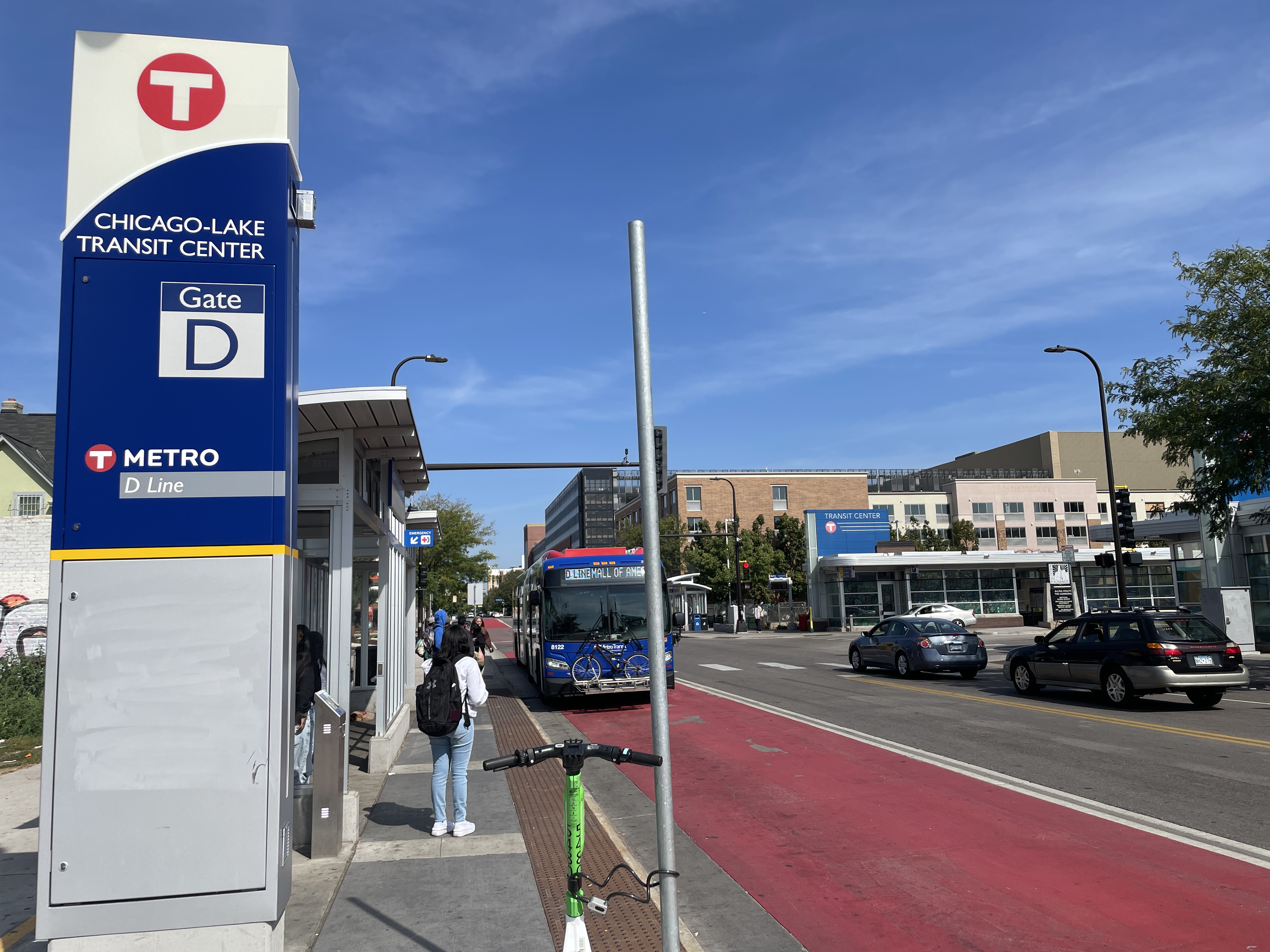
Dedicated bus lanes on Chicago Avenue

Bus-only lanes were first introduced to Hennepin Avenue South in 2018 and became permanent after a successful trial run. The bus-only lanes were found to improve speeds and reliability of travel through the corridor. The future Metro E Line would utilize these lanes. While bus-only lanes on Hennepin Avenue are only exclusively for transit during peak periods, a 24-hour bus-only lane was added to 7th Street in downtown Minneapolis in 2021. Local and express routes use 7th Street including the Metro C Line and Metro D Line. There is a southbound bus lane on Chicago Avenue between 28th and Lake Street as well.

=== Bus-only shoulders ===
Since 1991, Metro Transit buses have been allowed to use "bus-only shoulders," road shoulders to bypass traffic jams. Currently, buses are allowed to travel no more than 35 mph (56 km/h) or 15 mph (24 km/h) faster than the congested traffic in the general purpose lanes. Bus drivers must be very attentive when taking the bus onto the shoulder, since that part of the road is only about one foot wider than the buses in many cases. To help with this issue, researchers at the University of Minnesota helped rig up a bus with a lane-keep system, along with a heads-up display connected to a radar system to alert the driver of any obstacles. The technology was an adaptation of a system previously tested with drivers of snowplows and made some headlines in the early 2000s. This system will be more widely deployed under the Urban Partnership Agreement that assisted in the Marq2 project.

=== Transit centers ===
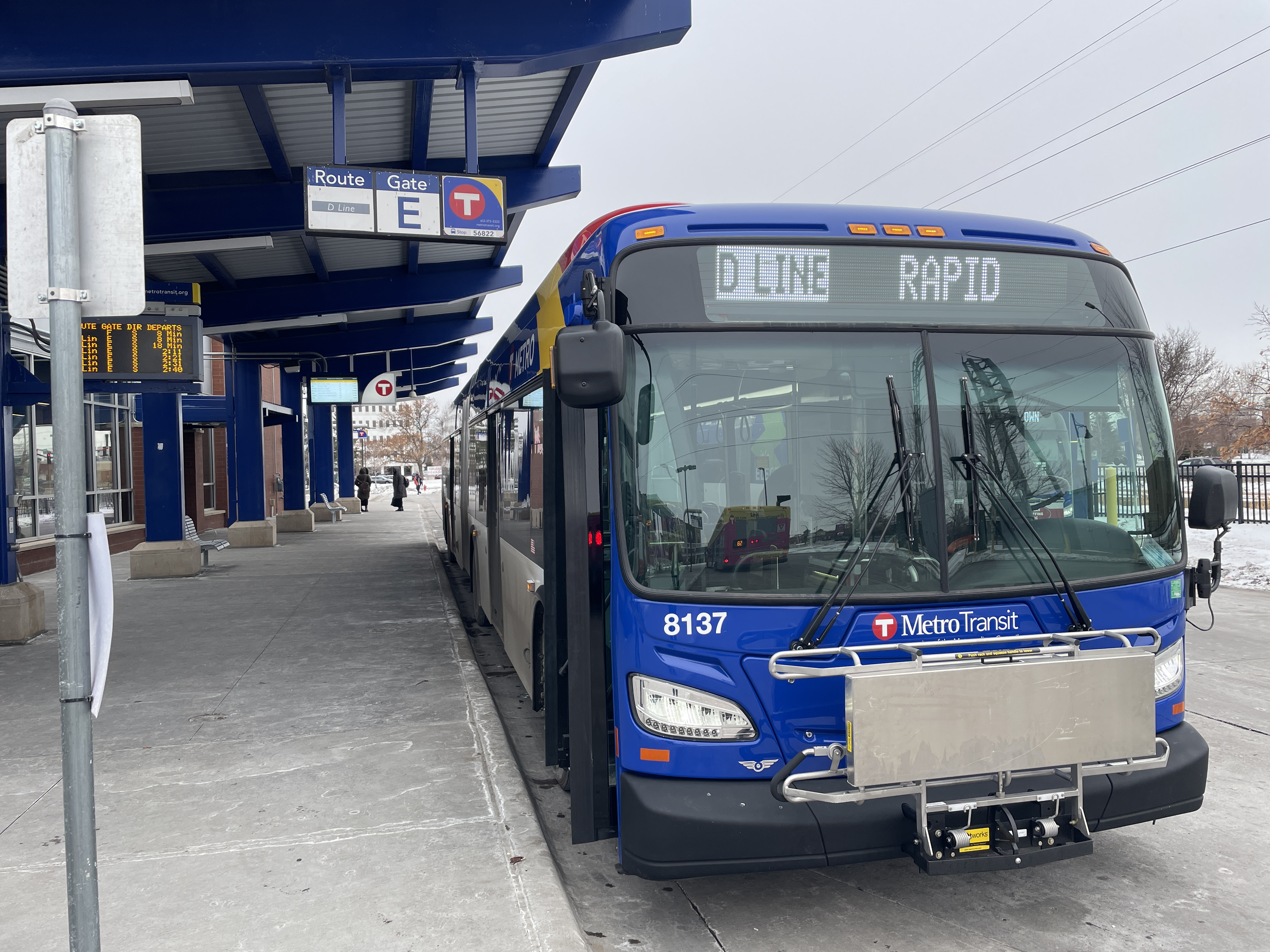
Boarding platforms at the Brooklyn Center Transit Center

Metro Transit operates 29 transit centers, which provide connection points for bus and rail services throughout the metropolitan area.

=== Park and rides ===
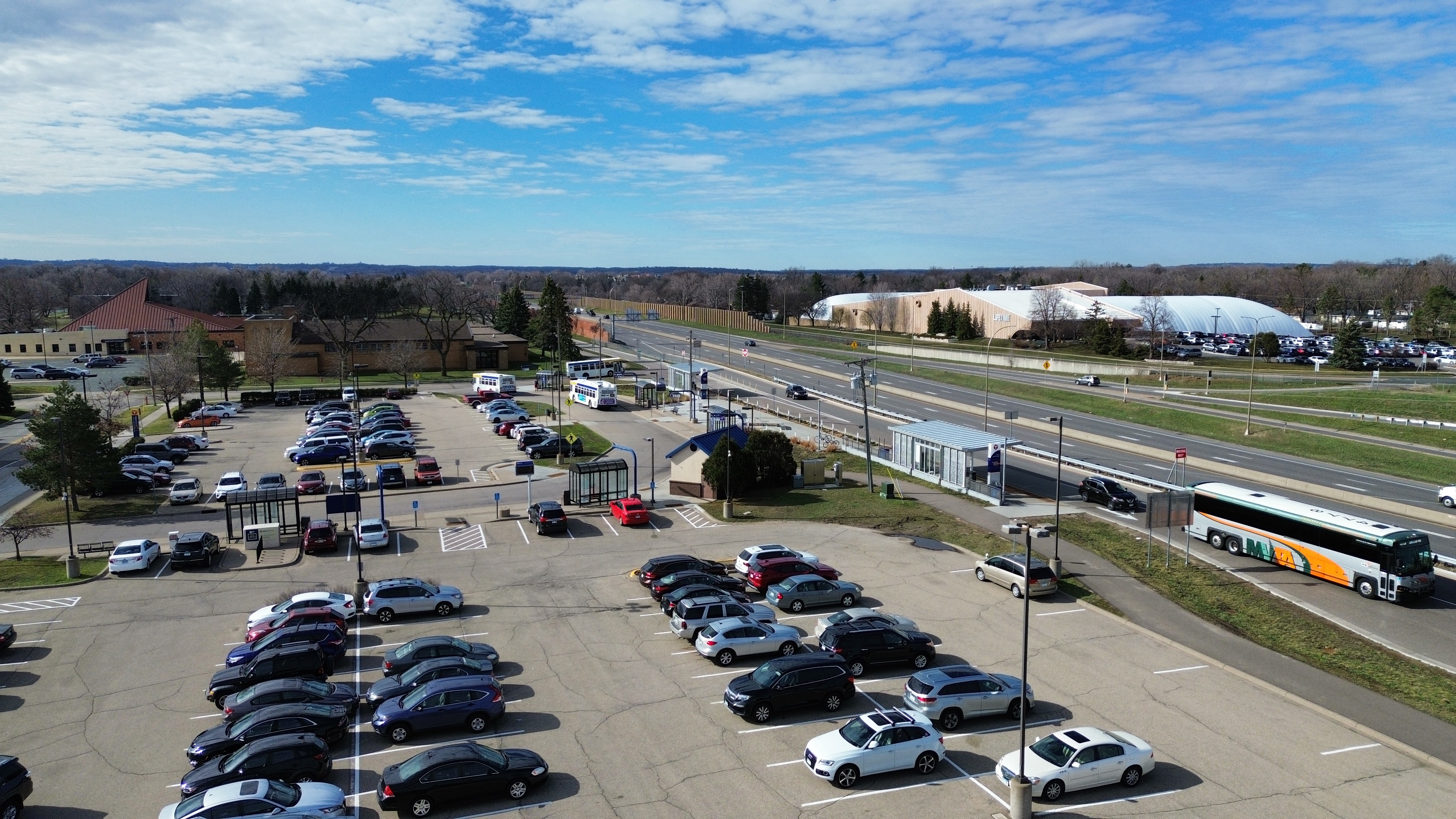
Park-and-ride lot at I-35W & 98th Street station in Bloomington

Metro Transit operated service to 70 park and ride lots and ramps, with a total of 20,570 parking spaces available in 2019. Almost 12,000 spaces were used on a typical day during the 2019 survey. These lots allow commuters to park their cars for free and take buses and trains to the downtown areas to avoid traffic congestion and parking fees. A report on the region's park and ride system, including other transit agencies, is published annually.

=== Better Bus Stops ===
After a Star Tribune investigation found mismatches between bus stops with enough riders to qualify for a bus shelter and bus shelters without enough rides to justify a shelter, Metro Transit committed to spending $5.8 million to improve shelters, with $3.26 million coming from a Federal Transit Administration "Ladders of Opportunity" grant. The 2014 investigation found that 460 bus stops in Metro Transit's service area had enough riders to qualify for a shelter under the agency's standards but did not have one, while 200 of the 801 existing shelters did not have enough riders to justify a shelter. To spend the money Metro Transit created a program called Better Bus Stops that reevaluated shelter placement guidelines. Metro Transit dedicated 10% of project funds on community outreach, which helped guide bus shelter and transit information changes at bus stops. Bus stop signs were redesigned to include more route information, and the agency made a goal of adding 150 additional shelters for a total of around 950. New shelter placement guidelines did away with different threshold for suburban and urban stops, and made the criteria based just on number of boardings and proximity to priority locations.

== Fleet ==
=== Buses ===
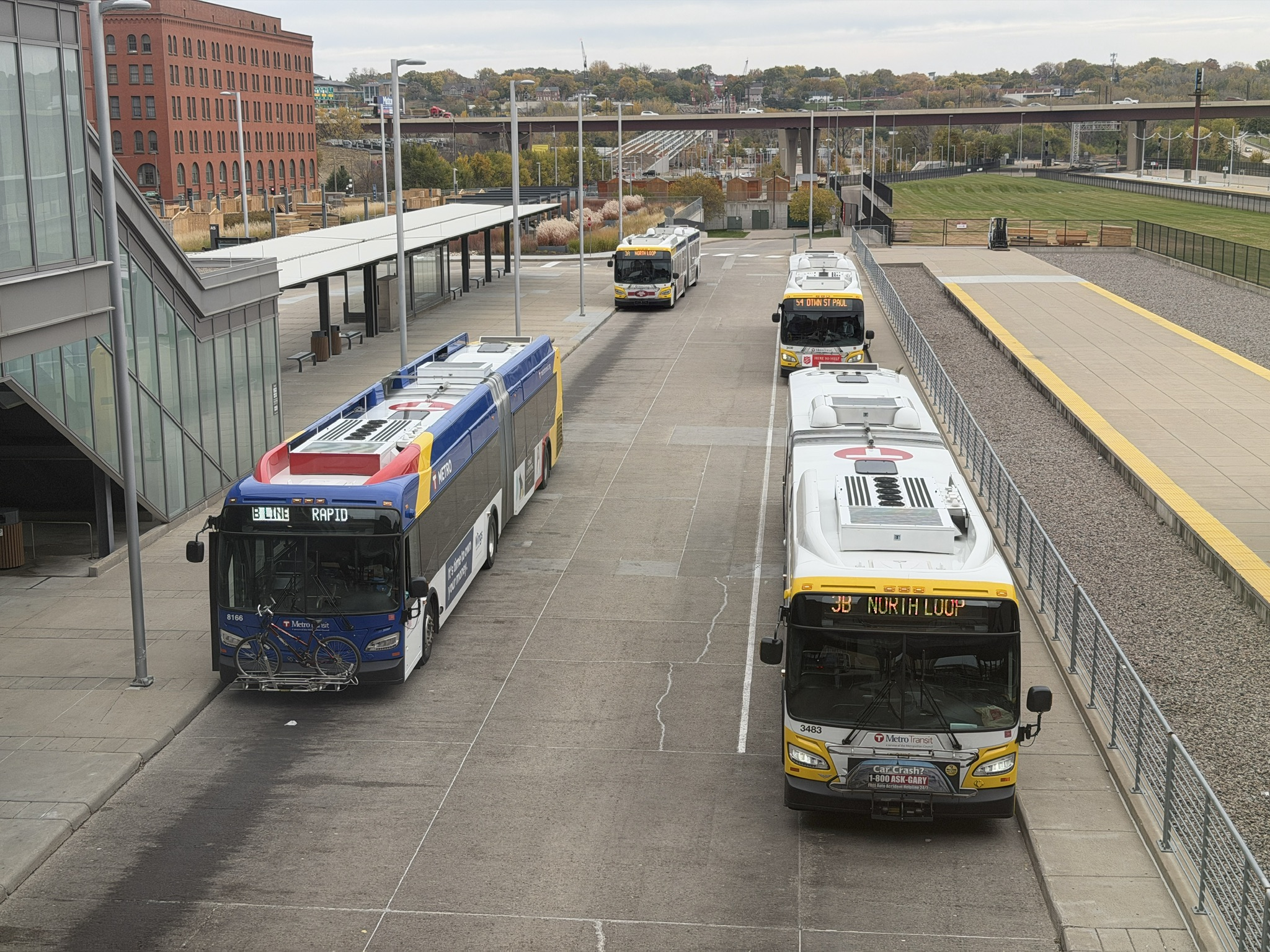
Metro Transit local and B Line buses at Saint Paul Union Depot

In the 2000s, most buses had a mostly white livery with a predominantly blue strip running horizontally along the side and a large white "T" inside a red circle on the roof. Diesel–electric hybrid buses introduced toward the end of the decade spurred new color schemes, with yellow at the front and the blue line moved above the side windows. The METRO buses are more colorful : principally blue with swooshes of red and yellow, with white beneath the windows. Metro Transit also uses vehicle wrap advertising on some buses and light rail cars, creating a different appearance.

All of the buses are handicapped-accessible, either using hydraulic lifts or a low-floor design. The Metropolitan Council also operates the Metro Mobility paratransit system for door-to-door transportation.

All Metro Transit buses and light rail trains have bike racks installed.

As of 2026, Metro Transit’s bus fleet consists of the following:

- Gillig BRT 40’
- Gillig BRT HEV 40’
- Gillig BRT Plus 40’
- Gillig Low Floor 40’
- Gillig Low Floor HEV 40’
- Gillig Low Floor Plus 40’
- Gillig Low Floor Plus EV 40’
- MCI D4500CT
- New Flyer D60LFR
- New Flyer XD60
- New Flyer XE60

=== Rail ===
Metro Transit operates 27 Bombardier Flexity Swift vehicles on the Blue Line light rail line. There are also 64 Siemens S70 vehicles operating on both the Blue and Green Line light rail lines. The METRO light-rail vehicles are predominantly blue and white, with yellow on each end and small red swooshes at each door.

== See also ==
- List of bus transit systems in the United States
- List of rail transit systems in the United States

Opt-out and regional providers:

- Maple Grove Transit
- Minnesota Valley Transit Authority
- Plymouth Metrolink
- SouthWest Transit
