= Eagan Transit Station =

Bus transit station in Eagan, Minnesota

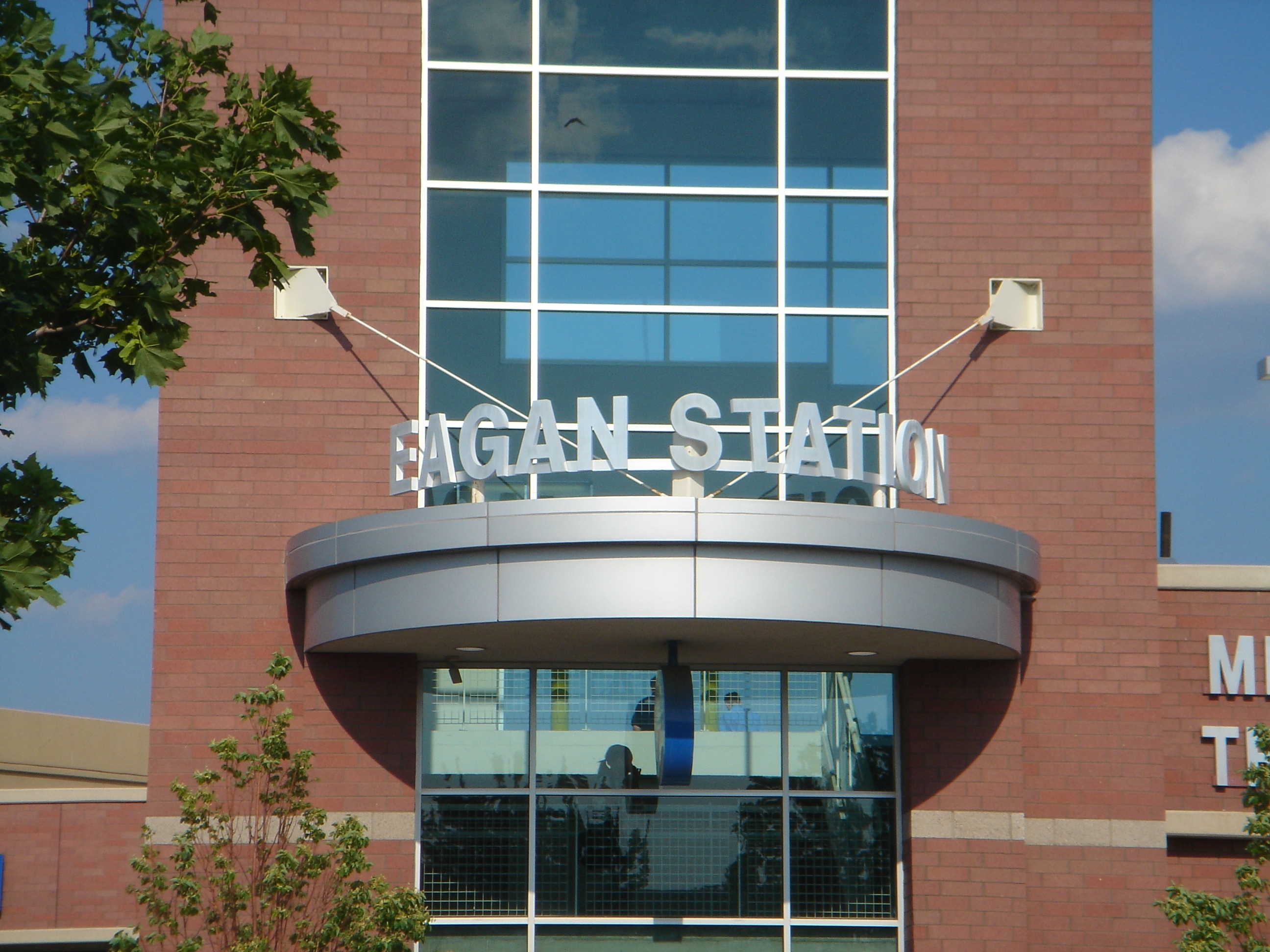

General information
- Location: 3470 Pilot Knob Road, Eagan, Minnesota
- Coordinates: 44°49′56″N 93°10′00″W
- Owner: Minnesota Valley Transit
- Line: 445, 446, 470, 480

Construction
- Accessible: Yes

History
- Opened: Originally Opened - 1999; Upgrade - 2003
Location

The Eagan Transit Station is a transit facility located in Eagan, Minnesota. Riders also hail from the nearby communities of Mendota Heights and Northern Rosemount. The Park & Ride lot has 750 parking spaces for bus passengers and retail employees.

Originally a surface lot for a park-and-ride stop, it currently includes retailers such as Bruegger's Bagels, The Tobacco Outlet, LeeAnn Chin and T-Mobile. Starbucks originally had a location at the station but moved up the street to Central Park Commons shortly after the opening of HyVee in September 2016. The facility is owned by Minnesota Valley Transit Authority.

In 2019, the station had 328 cars parked at the facility in a fall survey of park and rides in the Twin Cities. During the COVID-19 pandemic, usage dropped to only 22 cars in fall 2020 but by fall 2023, it had grown to 94.

== Bus connections ==
MVTA Bus routes:

- Route 445 (Cedar Grove Station / Blue Cross Road / Yankee Doodle Road / Eagan Town Center / Thomson Reuters)
- Route 446 (46th Street Station / Parkview Plaza / Mendota Heights Business Park / Corporate Center Drive / Eagandale / USPS Minnesota Hub / Wescott Rd & Denmark Ave / Duckwood Dr & Lexington Ave / Eagan High School)
- Route 470 (Downtown Minneapolis / Lake Street I-35W Station / Donald Rd & Yankee Doodle Rd / Blackhawk P&R)
- Route 480 (METRO Green Line - Saint Paul Union Depot / Blackhawk / Palomino Hills / METRO Red Line - Apple Valley Transit Station / Cliff Rd / Burnsville Parkway / Heart of the City P&R)

Connection Notes: Route 445 provides direct connections to the METRO Red Line and MVTA routes 440 (to VA Medical Center), 444 (to Burnsville & Savage w/connections to Shakopee on Route 495 @ Burnsville TS) and 475 (to the U of M) at Cedar Grove. Route 446 provides direct connections to the METRO Blue Line and METRO A Line (to Rosedale Center), along with Metro Transit routes 7 (to the U of M w/connections to Golden Valley and Richfield), 9 (to St. Louis Park & Golden Valley w/limited connections to Ridgedale), 46 (to Edina w/connections to Opus & Southdale), and 74 (to Highland Park & Downtown St. Paul) at 46th Street Station. Express Service to Downtown St. Paul is offered on Route 480 during the morning rush hour. Riders are encouraged to use MVTA Connect to reach other locations in Eagan & Rosemount not covered by local route or rideshare services like Uber or Lyft to reach destinations in nearby cities like Mendota Heights, Lilydale, West St. Paul, Inver Grove Heights, and Cottage Grove. Riders can reach Lakeville and Farmington via rideshare from Apple Valley, which can be reached on Route 442 or METRO Red Line.
