= Apple Valley station =

Transit facility in the United States

Apple Valley
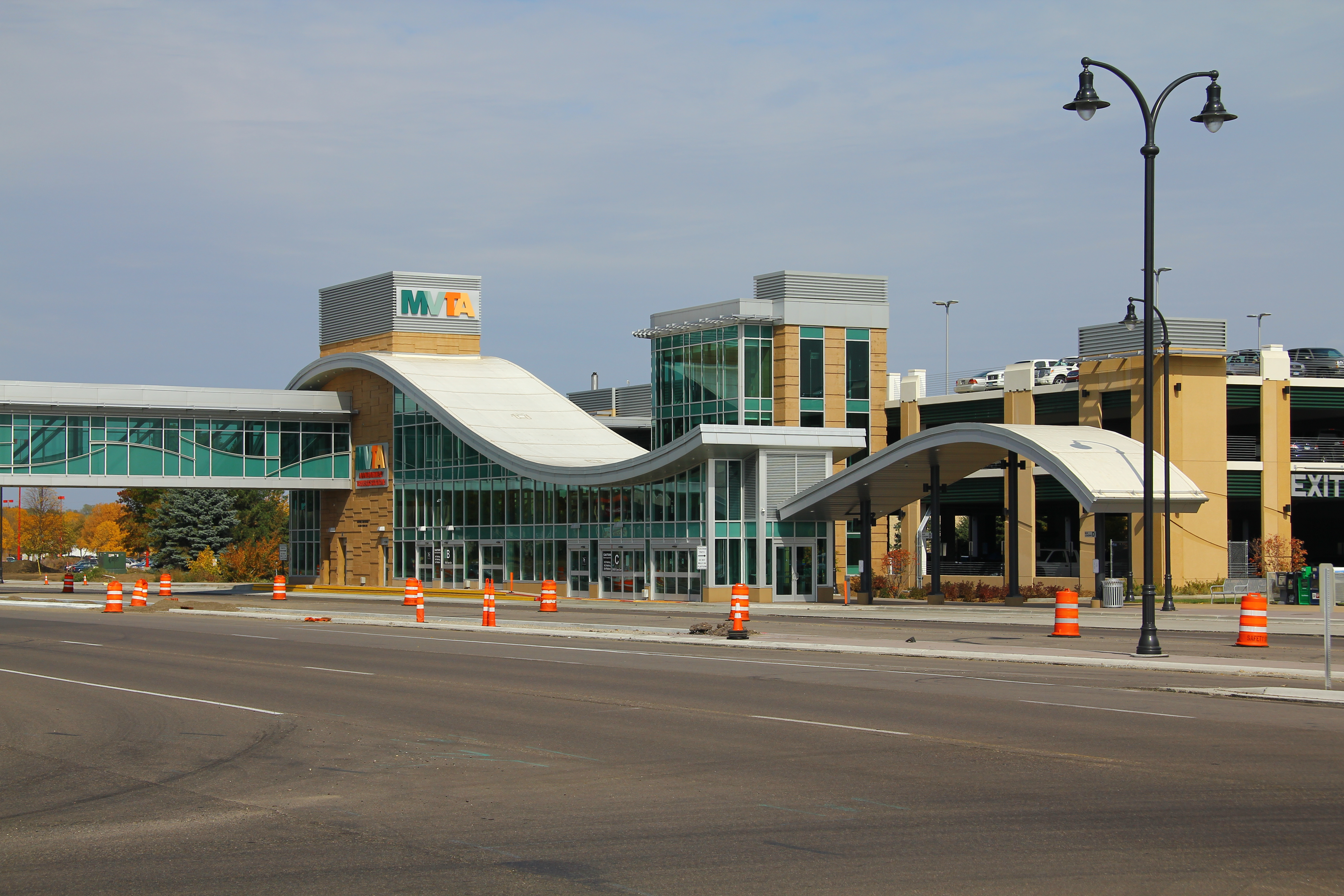
- Apple Valley station in 2012

General information
- Location: 15450 Cedar Avenue South
- Coordinates: 44°43′33″N 93°13′04″W
- Line: Red Line
- Connections: 420, 440, 442, 447, 475, 477, 480A

Construction
- Accessible: Yes

History
- Opened: Old Station - Summer 1999; New Station - January 4, 2010

Passengers
- 2025: 184 daily
- Rank: 62 out of 129

Services
Preceding station	Metro	Following station
147th Street toward Mall of America	Red Line	Terminus
Location

The Apple Valley Transit Station is a transit facility located in Apple Valley, Minnesota. It is owned by the City of Apple Valley and the MVTA. The transit station is near Cedar Avenue and Gaslight Drive. The station has capacity for 1,098 vehicles. It also serves the nearby communities of Lakeville and Farmington.

As part of the Metro Red Line BRT, the transit station was relocated. A construction groundbreaking ceremony took place on April 14, 2009 and an opening ceremony took place on January 7, 2010. This location was originally a Menards location when it opened in 1986, then in 1998 it became a recreational store called Watson's and it became this transit station.

The station's parking structure was originally 3 stories tall but was expanded in 2019 to 5 stories tall. An additional 330 spaces were added in the expansion. The expansion cost $8 million. Prior to the additional parking spaces being added in 2019, utilization of parking spaces was around 96%-99%. Funding came from MVTA, Dakota County, the Metropolitan Council and the federal government. While the parking ramp was closed for construction, nearby lots were used so transit riders could continue parking at the station.

In 2019, the station had 743 cars parked at the facility in a fall survey of park and rides in the Twin Cities. During the COVID-19 pandemic, usage dropped to only 38 cars in fall 2020 but by fall 2023, it had grown to 333. It was the third busiest park-and-ride in the Twin Cities region in 2023.

== Bus connections ==
- Route 420 (Southport Shopping Center / Rosemount Community Center / Rosemount Transit Station)
- Route 440 (Southport Shopping Center / 153rd Street / Garrett Ave / 147th Street Station / Pennock Ave / 140th Street Station / Eastview High School / Johnny Cake Ridge Road / Minnesota Zoo / County Road 38 / Palomino Hills P&R / Nichols Road / Cedar Grove / VA Medical Center)
- Route 442 (Mall of America / Cedar Grove / Palomino Hills P&R / Whitney Drive / Garden View Road / Apple Valley Community Center / Evergreen Drive / Fairview Ridges Hospital / Burnsville Center)
- Route 447 (County Road 42 / Burnsville Center / Savage Park & Ride / Prior Lake / Mystic Lake Casino)
- Route 475 (Downtown Minneapolis / Lake Street I-35W Station / Cedar Grove / Minnesota Zoo / University of Minnesota (Coffman, Anderson, Wiley & Cooke) / Ridder Arena / Huntington Bank Stadium / Stadium Village Station)
- Route 477 (Downtown Minneapolis / Lake Street I-35W Station / Palomino Hills / 157th Street Station / Lakeville Cedar)
- Route 480A (St. Paul Union Depot / Eagan Transit Station / Palomino Hills / Blackhawk P&R)

Connection Notes: Route 420 is the only local route providing service to Rosemount, riders are encouraged to use MVTA Connect for nearby destinations like DCTC or rideshare services like Uber or Lyft to reach other destinations in Hastings, Cottage Grove, Inver Grove Heights, Lakeville and/or Farmington. Route 440 makes direct connections to the METRO Blue Line and Metro Transit Route 22 (to Brooklyn Center) @ VA Medical Center. Route 447 provides service to Mystic Lake Casino and is the only local route from this station with frequent service to Prior Lake, riders are encouraged to use Rideshare Services like Uber or Lyft to reach other destinations, this could include nearby Shakopee & Prior Lake, along with cities outside MVTA's service zone like Eden Prairie, Jordan, Jackson, Chaska, Carver and/or Chanhassen. Route 475 provides service to the U of M. Route 477 provides limited weekday service southbound to Lakeville, riders are encouraged to use Rideshare services like Uber or Lyft as a definitive alternative. Route 480A is non-stop along Palomino Drive, 127th Street and Galaxie Avenue and by-passes Burnsville via terminal letter "A", with trips going Northbound to the Eagan Transit Station & St. Paul Union Depot during rush hour/peak periods.

== See also ==
- Other Transit Facilities
