= Burnsville Transit Station =

Transit facility in Burnsville, Minnesota

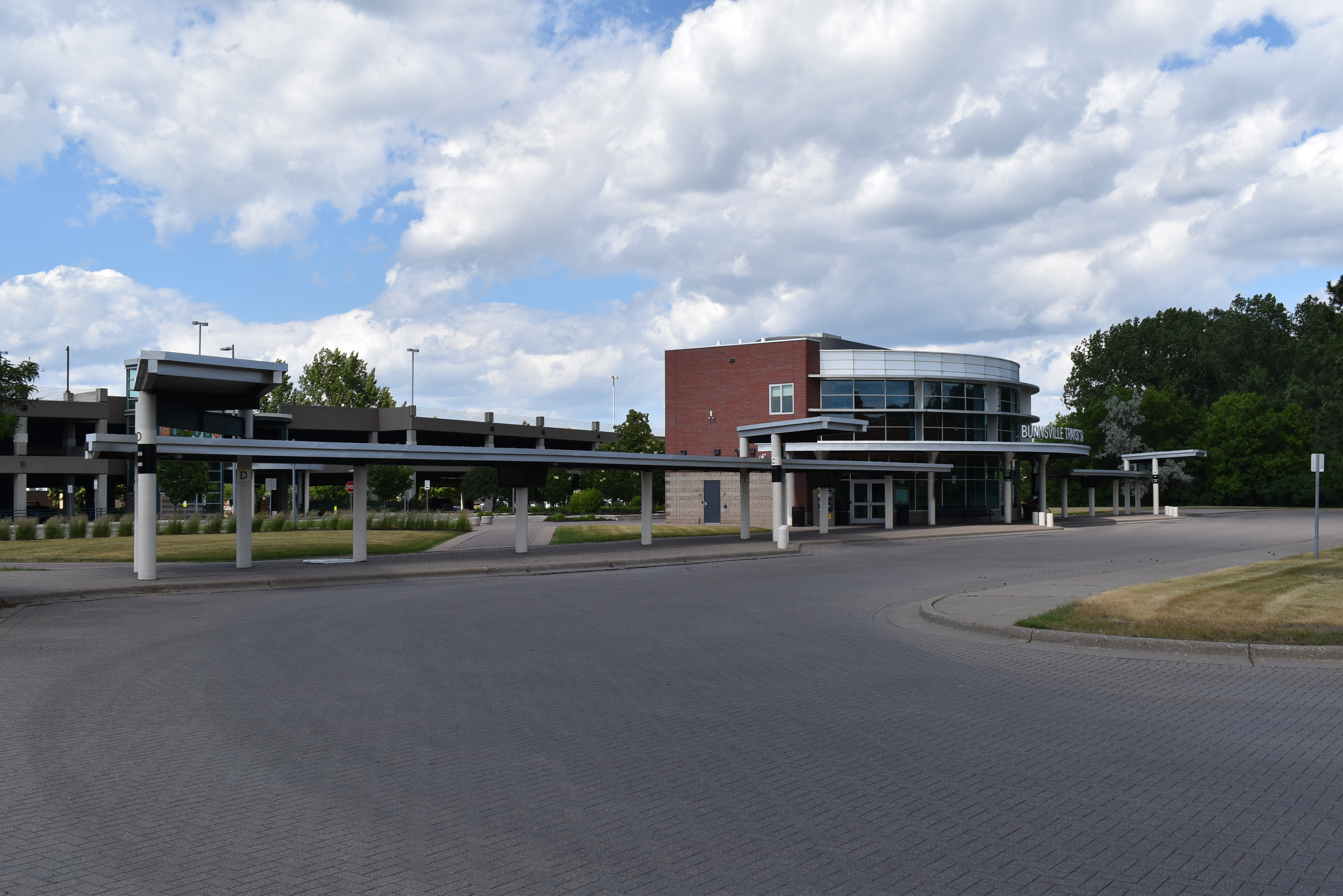
- The Burnsville Transit Station

General information
- Location: 100 E. Highway 13
- Coordinates: 44°46′44″N 93°16′34″W
- Owner: Minnesota Valley Transit Authority
- Connections: 421, 426, 444, 460, 465, 495

Construction
- Parking: 1,428 spaces
- Accessible: Yes

History
- Opened: July 31, 1995
Location

Burnsville Transit Station is a transit facility located in the vicinity of downtown Burnsville, Minnesota, and is the flagship station of the Minnesota Valley Transit Authority (MVTA). The station is the busiest park and ride location in the Twin Cities region and offers approximately 1,400 parking spaces. It is also a major transfer hub for routes operating the south of the Minnesota River. The station has indoor climate-controlled waiting, restrooms, lost and found, drinking fountains, vending machines, Go-To card sales, newspaper racks, and transit information. Due to high park and ride demand, MVTA moved some service to the 370 space Heart of the City public ramp about a 1/2 mile (0.80 km) south in 2018. The Metropolitan Council's 2021 park-and-ride system report found 267 cars parked at the station compared to 1,116 in 2019 before the COVID-19 pandemic.

The Burnsville Heart of the City bus rapid transit station on the METRO Orange Line is located kitty-corner across Minnesota State Highway 13, about a 1/4 mile (400 m) away. Consideration was given to locating the Orange Line terminus at the MVTA station but the existing amount of buses and riders encouraged Metro Transit to locate the station elsewhere.

== History ==
Express bus service from Burnsville to downtown Minneapolis has existed since at least 1972. Early park-and-rides were located near I-35W and Minnesota Highway 13. Service was provided by the predecessor of Metro Transit, MTC, until the creation of Minnesota Valley Transit Authority. MVTA was formed in 1990 and transit service from Burnsville began operating under the MVTA branding in 1991. Service in MVTA communities expanded and while 1,085 parking spaces were provided for riders throughout their system, 97% were full by 1993. MVTA sought funding from the Regional Transit Board, the agency supervising transit service in the Twin Cities region, to improve park-and-ride locations in Apple Valley, Burnsville, and Eagan. Demand for more spaces was projected as needing 300 more spaces in 1993 and 700 more spaces by 1996. A need for a 500 space park-and-ride lot in Burnsville by I-35W were identified but no timeline for construction had been established. A year later in 1994, the new park-and-ride lot in Burnsville near I-35W was slated for construction in that same year. The 550 space lot with room for expansion would quadruple the previous lot. Burnsville Transit Station opened in 1995 and its combination of many parking spaces, indoor waiting area, space for additional businesses nearby was the first in the Twin Cities.

The station cost $2.5 million in 1995 when it opened on the site of the old Lucky Twin Drive-In movie theater. The station originally opened with 600 parking spaces and was designed to include commercial spaces on its 15-acre site such as doctor offices, dentist offices, a day-care center, or other tenants that would make running an errand after work easier for riders. The station first served riders on July 31, 1995. It was the first bus station in the metro area to include commercial development as part of its creation rather than just bus rider amenities like restrooms, heated waiting spaces, and electronic departure signs. Within two months of opening 510 spaces were used daily compared to the 350 spaces that had been used at a park and ride across the street. A second deck to the parking ramp expanded the number of spaces available and the station was serving 2,120 rides a day by 1998. Funding for an expansion costing $2.4 million was approved by the Metropolitan Council in 2000. By 2000 MVTA was focusing more on accommodating the growth of ridership which had grown 9-12% each year since opening the Burnsville Transit Station then promoting new riders who may be attracted by commercial tenants other than the day-care operating there. A third level to the parking structure was planned for 2001. By 2014 the parking ramp for Burnsville station could park 1,428 vehicles and was up to 80% full at times. In the busiest hour 27 buses served the station as part of 217 daily bus trips. Ticket vending machines for Go-To cards were added in 2014.

== Bus connections ==
- Orange LINK (Burnsville Walmart / Burnsville Heart of the City Station / Fairview Ridges / Burnsville Center / 150th & Greenhaven Dr)
- Route 444 (Mall of America / Cedar Grove / Highway 13 / Travelers Trail / Heart of the City / Burnsville Parkway / County Road 5 / Burnsville Center / County Road 42 / 143rd & Irving / Savage Park & Ride)
- Route 460 (Downtown Minneapolis / I-35W & Lake Street)
- Route 465U (University of Minnesota - Coffman, Anderson, Wiley & Cooke / Ridder Arena / Huntington Bank Stadium / Stadium Village Station / Downtown Minneapolis / I-35W & Lake Street / South Bloomington Transit Center)
- Route 480B (Blackhawk P&R / Eagan Transit Station / Union Depot)
- Route 495 (Mall of America / Marschall Road Transit Station / Mystic Lake Casino)

== See also ==
- Burnsville Heart of the City station
- METRO Orange Line
- Other Transit Facilities
