= Cedar Grove Transit Station =

Cedar Grove
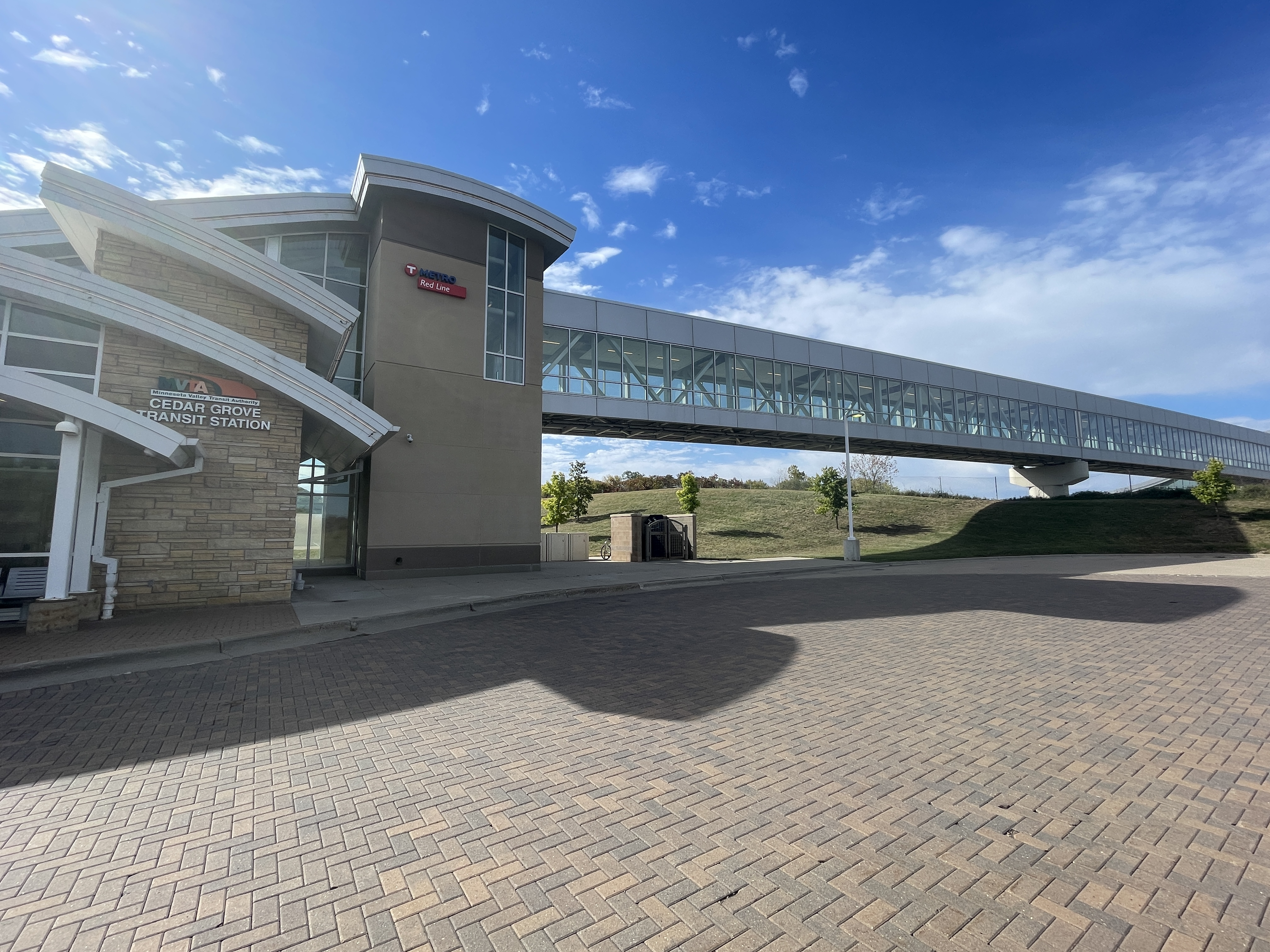
- Cedar Grove Station bus circle, waiting area, and skyway to central island platform.

General information
- Coordinates: 44°48′45″N 93°13′06″W
- Owner: Minnesota Valley Transit Authority
- Line: Red Line
- Platforms: Online island platform
- Connections: 440, 442, 444, 445, 475U

Construction
- Accessible: Yes

History
- Opened: March 20, 2010 (Regular service); June 22, 2013 (BRT service)

Passengers
- 2025: 72 daily
- Rank: 109 out of 129

Services
Preceding station	Metro	Following station
Mall of America Terminus	Red Line	140th Street toward Apple Valley
Location

The Cedar Grove Transit Station is a transit facility in Eagan, Minnesota. It serves the Minnesota Valley Transit Authority bus system and the Metro Red Line bus rapid transit system. It opened March 20, 2010, in the Cedar Grove community.

The station was built adjacent to Cedar Avenue freeway (Minnesota State Highway 77), but there was not any direct access from the freeway to the station for buses. Red Line Buses had to exit the freeway at Diffley Road, travel up Nicols Road to the station, pick up passengers, then double back along Nicols Road and Diffley Road to get back on the freeway, a maneuver that added five to ten minutes for each trip.

The lengthy, indirect routing was seen as lowering the potential ridership of the Red Line. During planning for the Orange Line, elected officials saw the Cedar Grove Transit Station as a design to avoid and a danger to the success of the Orange Line. Ultimately, the Burnsville Heart of the City station was built offline from I-35W but it serves as the terminus of the route and detours fewer customers than the Cedar Grove Transitation design.

New "in-line" access was designed with a station platform in the freeway median and a pedestrian bridge over the northbound lane of Cedar Avenue, connecting it to the original station area. The platform layout bears a similarity to the 46th Street station on Interstate 35W in Minneapolis, which is about 11 miles north via the highway. Buses perform a "crossover" maneuver to have left-hand running around the platform, which is necessary since Red Line buses only have doors on the right-hand side. A groundbreaking ceremony for the $15 million station upgrade was held on April 28, 2016, which opened on May 20, 2017. Despite this upgrade, MVTA buses still exit and enter the freeway at Diffley Road to access the station.

== Bus connections ==
- Route 440 (VA Medical Center / Highway 77 - Cedar Ave / Nicols Road / Palomino Hills / County Road 38 / Minnesota Zoo / Johnny Cake Ridge Road / 140th Street Station / Pennock Ave / 147th Street Station / Garret Ave / Southport Shopping Center / Apple Valley Transit Station)
- Route 442 (Mall of America / Palomino Hills / Apple Valley Transit Station / Whitney Drive / Garden View Road / Apple Valley Community Center / Evergreen Drive / Fairview Ridges Hospital / Burnsville Center)
- Route 444 (Mall of America / Highway 13 / Burnsville Transit Station / Travelers Trail / Heart of the City / Burnsville Parkway / County Road 5 / Burnsville Center / County Road 42 / Savage)
- Route 445 (Yankee Doodle Road / Blue Cross Road / Donald Ave / Coachman Oaks / Eagan Transit Station / Duckwood Drive / Eagan Town Center / Thomson Reuters)
- Route 475U (University of Minnesota (Coffman, Anderson, Wiley & Cooke) / Ridder Arena / TCF Bank Stadium / Stadium Village METRO Green Line LRT Station / Downtown Minneapolis / Lake Street I-35W Station / Minnesota Zoo / Apple Valley)

Connection Notes: Riders can connect to the METRO Blue Line @ Mall of America from the METRO Red Line and MVTA Routes 442 & 444. Route 440 "V" terminal trips make connections to Metro Transit Route 22 (Minneapolis/Brooklyn Center) @ VA Medical Center. Route 475 operates frequent weekday service to the U of M. Service to Shakopee and Prior Lake is available on Route 495, which transit users will be able to make connections to @ Mall of America. MVTA riders/transit users are encouraged to use the Connect on-demand service where local service isn't available within the service area, and Uber/Lyft outside the service area south and east of Eagan.

== Gallery ==
Cedar Grove Transit Station gallery photos
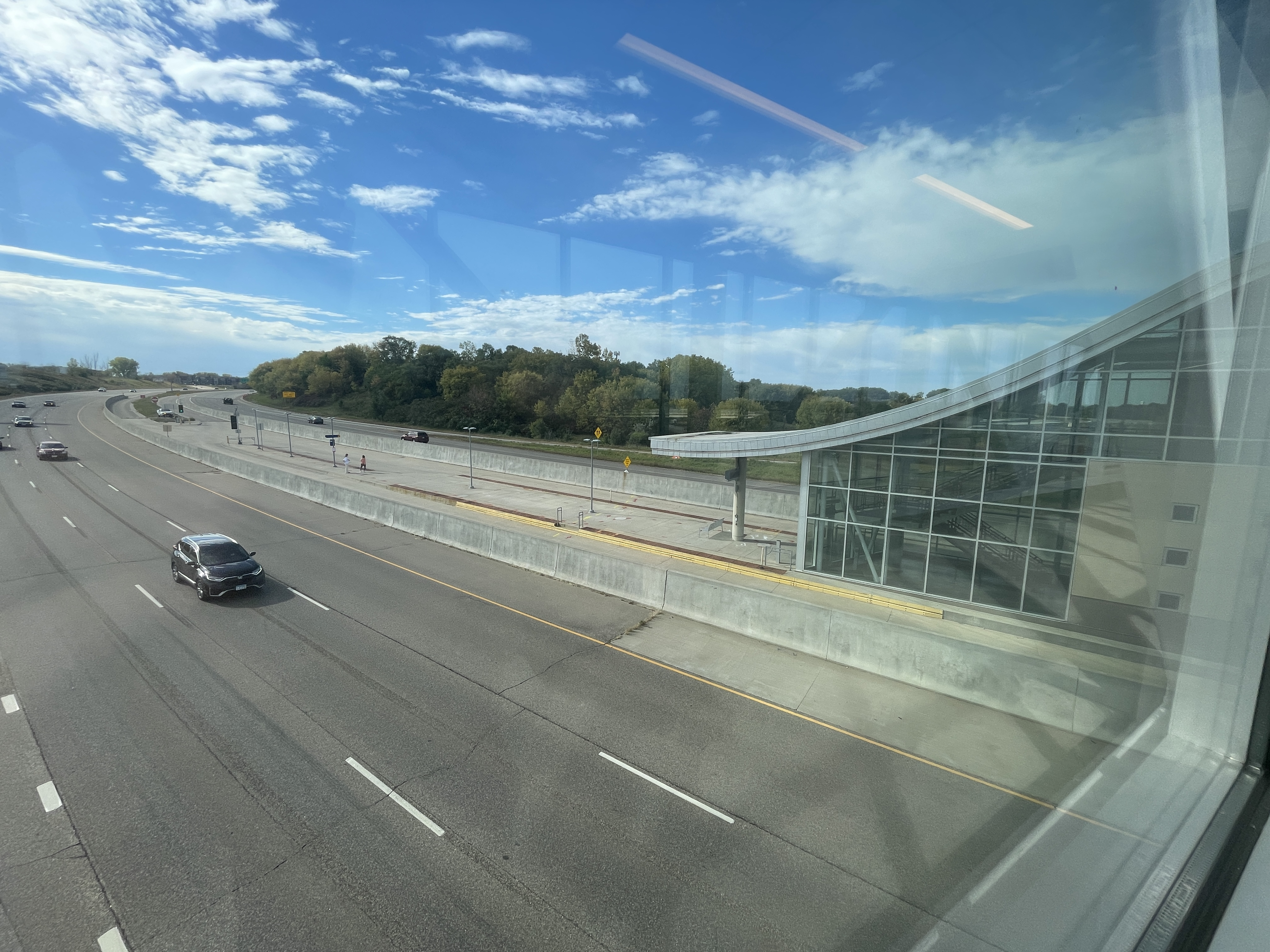
Cedar Grove Station looking down from the skyway.

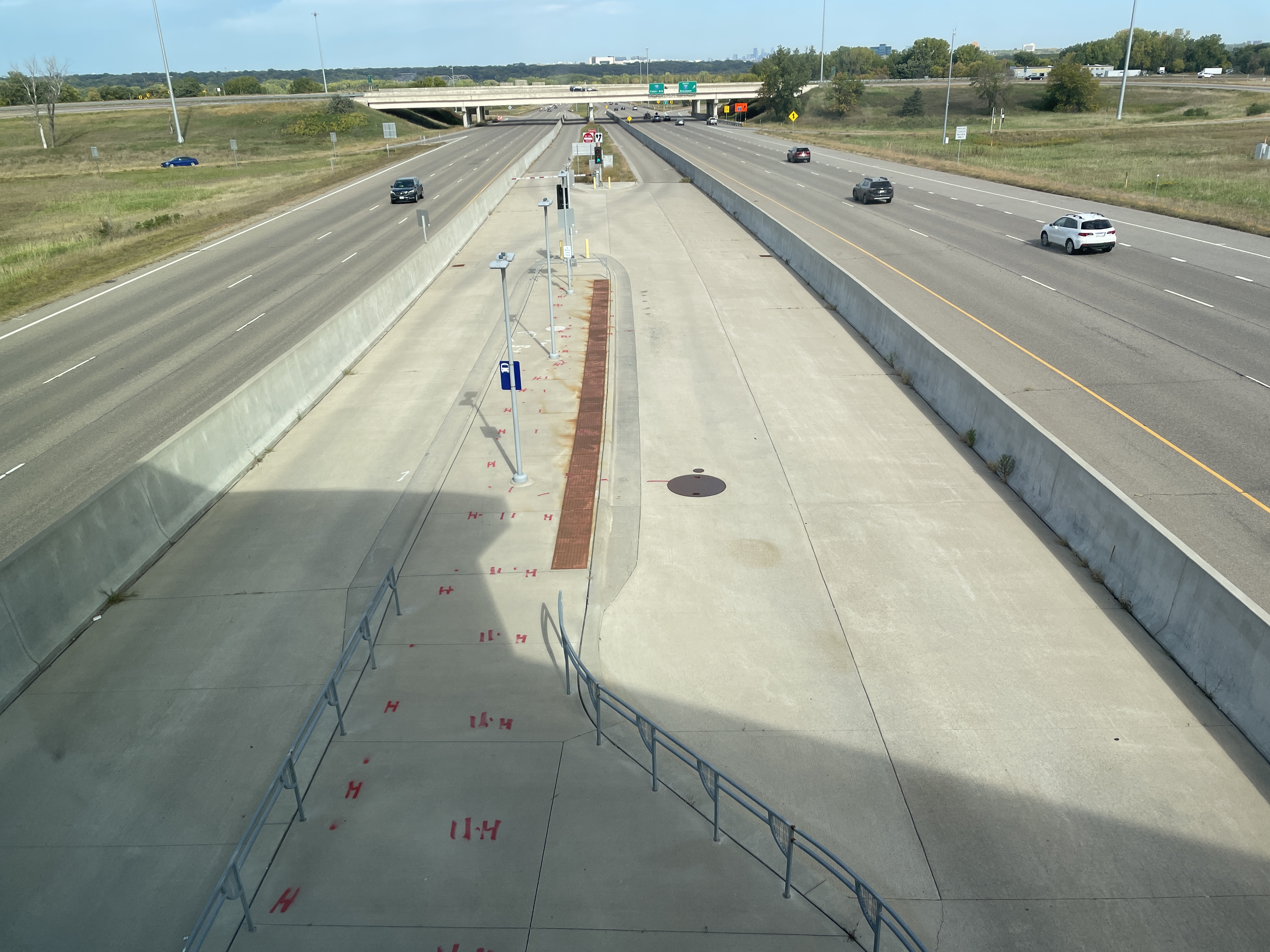
Cedar Grove Station looking down towards boarding platforms

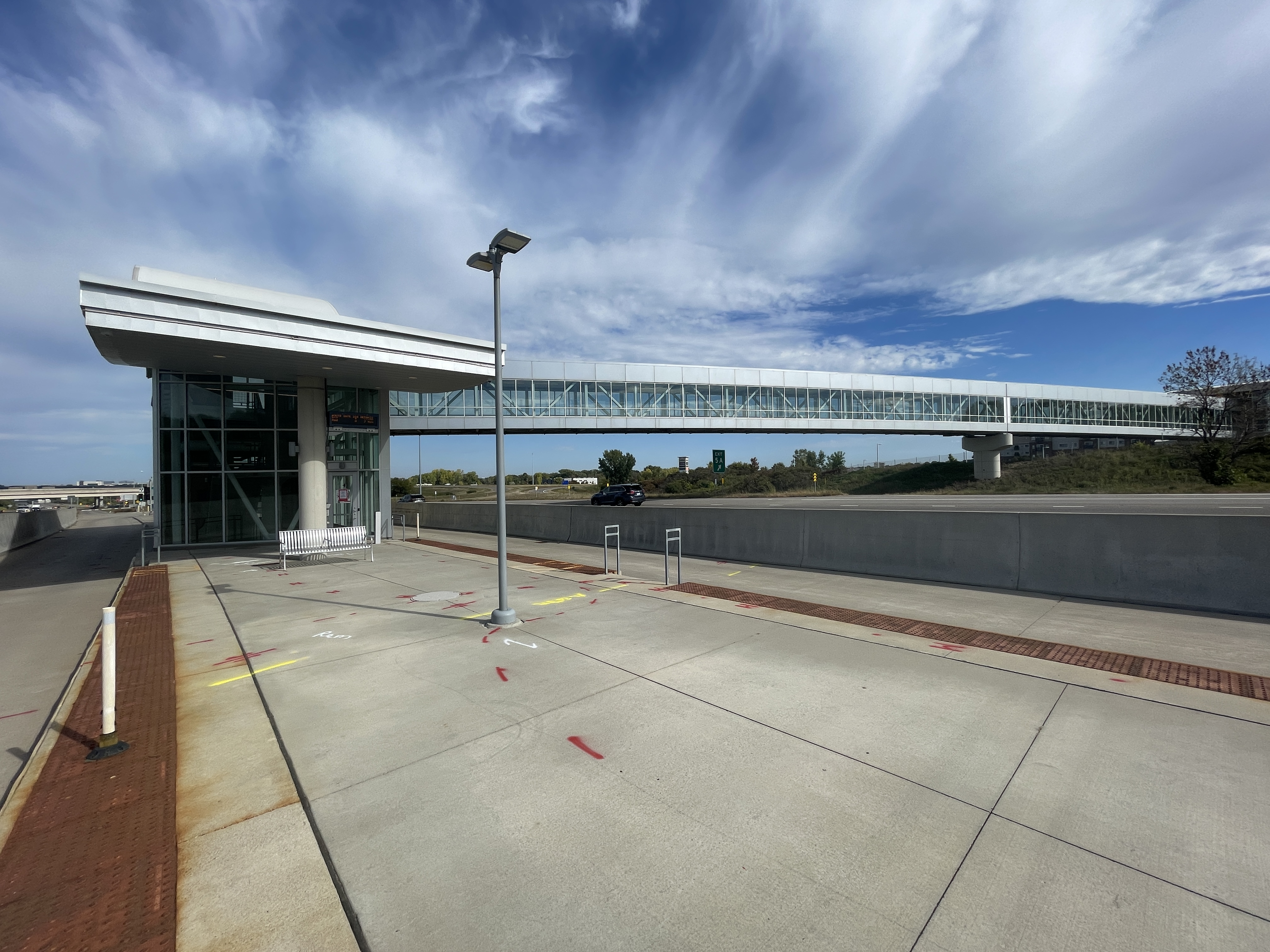
Cedar Grove Station from platform towards skyway.

== See also ==
- Other Minnesota Valley Transit Authority facilities
