= Scott County Transit =

Scott County Transit operates the Shakopee Transit Buses which runs the Route 496E East Circulator and Route 496W West Circulator in Scott County, Minnesota. These buses loop as local routes through Shakopee, Minnesota. Shakopee Transit along with the Prior Lake Laker Lines operate the BlueXpress, which is a direct express to Minneapolis. Scott County operates a Dial-A-Ride for anyone in Scott, Carver, and surrounding Counties. Each ride is a one way ride to their destination with no transfers. Riding in Shakopee is $2.00 In Scott County (Out of Shakopee but in the county) and Chaska (Carver County) $3.00. Prices are different in other counties.
