= Metro Red Line (Minnesota) =

Bus rapid transit line

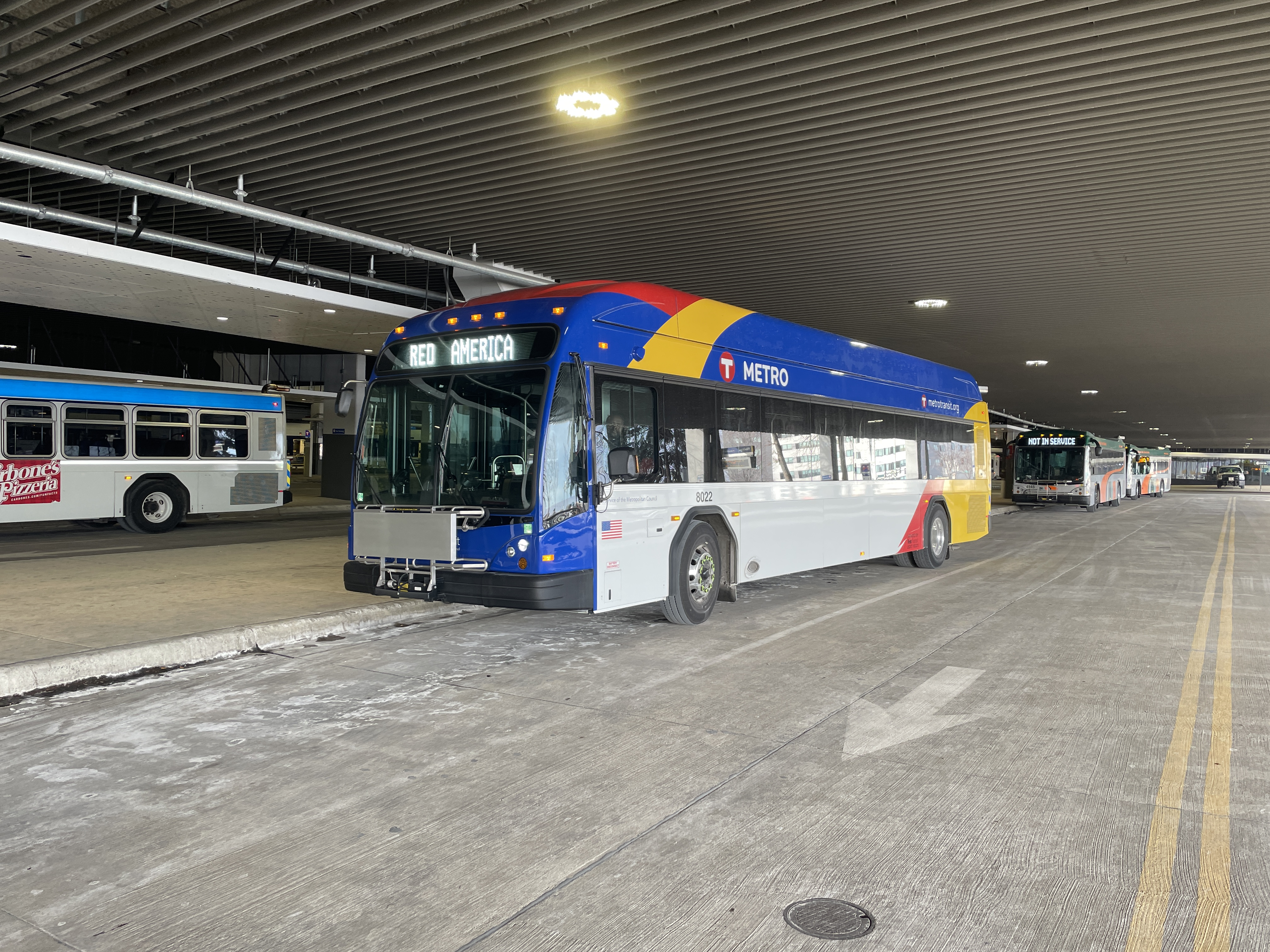
- Red Line bus at Mall of America station in 2022.

Overview
- System: Metro
- Operator: Metro Transit
- Garage: Nicollet
- Vehicle: Gillig Low Floor BRT Plus
- Status: Operational
- Began service: June 22, 2013

Route
- Route type: Highway bus rapid transit
- Locale: (Hennepin County); Bloomington, Minnesota (Dakota County); Eagan, Minnesota; Burnsville, Minnesota; Apple Valley, Minnesota; Planned: Rosemount, Minnesota; Farmington, Minnesota; Lakeville, Minnesota
- Start: Mall of America
- Via: MN 77 (Cedar Avenue)
- End: Apple Valley
- Length: 10.1 miles (16.3 km)
- Stations: 5 (7 planned)

Service
- Level: Daily
- Frequency: Every 30 minutes
- Weekend frequency: Every 30 minutes
- Journey time: 20 minutes
- Operates: 5:00am – 10:00pm

The Metro Red Line is a bus rapid transit line between the Twin Cities suburbs of Bloomington, Minnesota and Apple Valley, Minnesota. The Red Line travels primarily on Minnesota State Highway 77 and Cedar Avenue from the Apple Valley station in Apple Valley, north through Eagan, Minnesota, to the Mall of America station in Bloomington where it connects to the Metro Blue Line. The line has bus rapid transit elements including bus-only lanes, specially branded vehicles, transit signal priority, and dedicated stations.

The line was designed to ease traffic congestion along the Cedar Avenue corridor. During planning the project was known as the Cedar Avenue Bus Rapid Transitway until it was renamed the Red Line in 2011 as part of a regional branding of the Metro system. After a few construction schedule setbacks, the line officially began operation on June 22, 2013. The Red Line cost $21 million but a further $34 million was spent on express bus service upgrades, and $57 million on roadway expansion for a total project cost of $112 million. A further $15 million was spent to construct an improved passenger station that no longer requires buses to exit the highway and saves 10 minutes on a round trip journey. The line was operated by the Minnesota Valley Transit Authority under a contract from the Metropolitan Council until December 5, 2020, when Metro Transit took over operations.

An extension to Lakeville is planned with an opening in 2040.

== Route description ==
The Red Line's northern terminus is the Mall of America station at the Mall of America in Bloomington. At the station are connections to eight bus routes and the Metro Blue Line. From the Mall of America, the route travels on Minnesota State Highway 77 and serves the Cedar Grove Transit Station which has bus stops in the middle of the highway with an indoor walkway to a park-and-ride lot adjacent to the highway near the Twin Cities Premium Outlets shopping mall. The route crosses Interstate 35E and serves two stations at 140th and 147th streets. The final stop is at the Apple Valley Transit Station.

== Service and operation ==
The Red Line aimed for 975 daily rides in its first year. While in the Red Line's first year of operation MVTA's ridership numbers reached record levels, ridership on the line in the first few years was lower than expected. Ridership reached only 85% of projected rides in the first year. Ridership was estimated to reach 1,600 per day by 2017.

From 2013 to 2017 half of the Red Lines budget came from the Counties Transit Improvement Board and half from the Metropolitan Council. After the Counties Transit Improvement Board was dissolved, the Metropolitan Council supported the full budget of the Red Line. Dakota County's portion of the Red Line's budget was $1.3 million in 2017. The MVTA operated the Red Line through a contract with the Metropolitan Council and cost $3.2 million in 2020 to provide the service. After first discussing the plan with MVTA in July 2020, the Metropolitan Council announced that it would not renew its operating contract with MVTA, instead opting for Metro Transit to take over operations starting on December 5, 2020. Frequency and hours of operations are planned to remain unchanged.

Ridership in 2019 was 242,372 rides for a subsidy of $9.97 per passenger. The other two bus rapid transit lines in the Metro system, the A Line and the C Line, had subsidies of $3.85 per passenger and light rail service cost $1.96 per passenger. Suburban local and commuter express bus subsidy for MVTA, which is the territory the Red Line operates in, was $12.10 and $6.07 per passenger trip respectively, which is higher than the Twin Cities region subsidies of $7.38 and $5.52 per passenger trip respectively.

Red Line buses run mostly on bus-only lanes and have transit signal priority. Trips to downtown Minneapolis from Apple Valley station that take the Red Line to the Blue Line take about an hour versus 40-43 minutes on an express bus.

=== Fleet ===
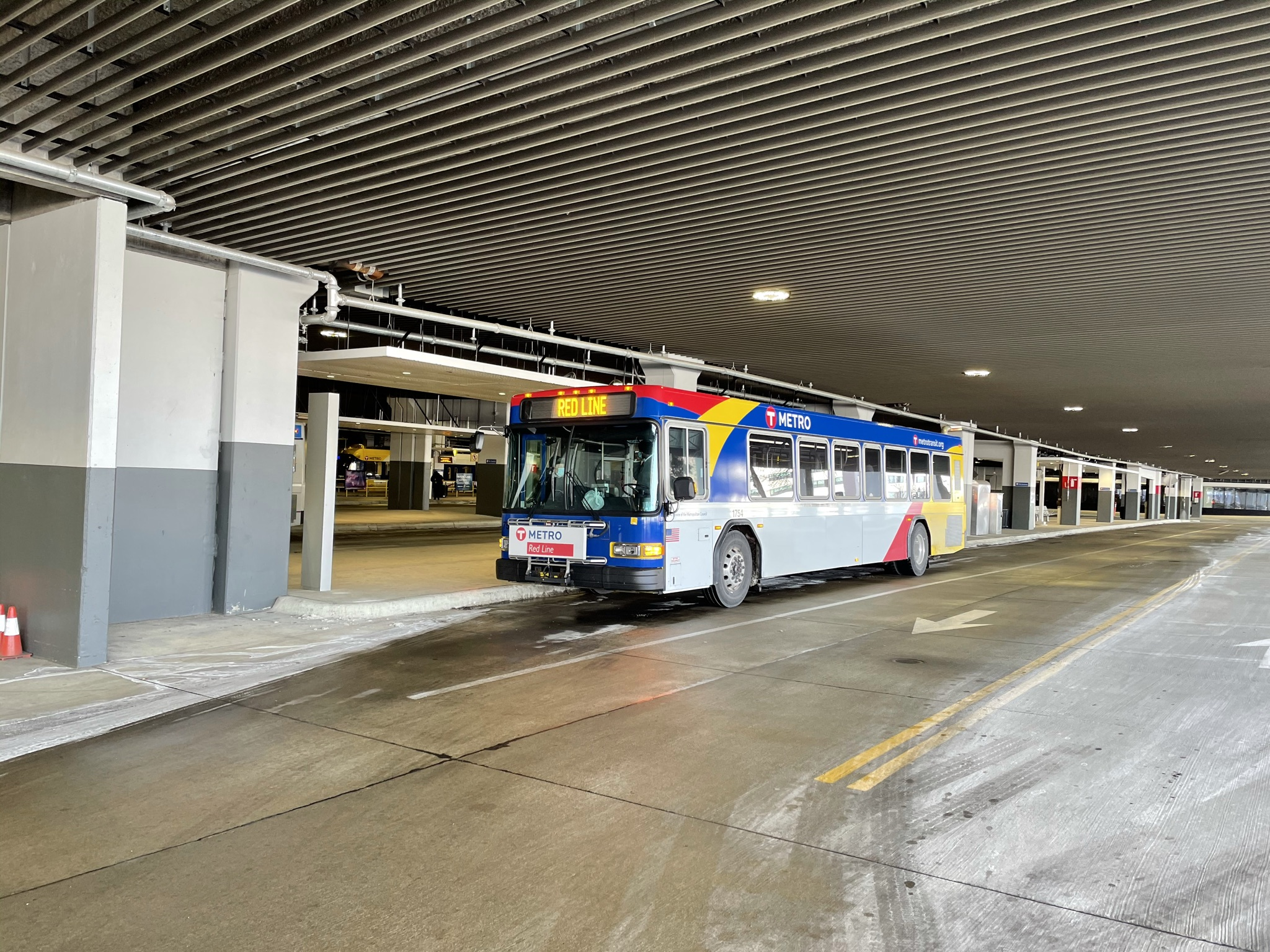
Temporary Red Line bus wrapped in Metro Transit BRT livery between use of Nova bus and Gillig BRT Plus vehicles.

The Red Line initially operated using Nova Bus LFX 40' buses (4252-4258), the first and only in the Twin Cities. Buses were chosen to provide a riding experience closer to that of riding a train with larger windows, interior space for bikes, an exterior designed to be similar to light rail vehicles. Station and bus design allows for level boarding for passengers. The vehicle design was chosen out of three other competitors and had been available on the market for five years before being purchased by the Metropolitan Council. The seven buses purchased cost between $450,000-$550,000 each. All buses were equipped with lane departure warning systems and collision avoidance system advisories. The original interior bike racks were replaced with exterior bike racks several months after opening.

These buses were retired in December 2020 when Metro Transit took over operations from MVTA. Until 2022, the route has been operated by 7 40' Gilligs temporarily wrapped in the METRO livery (1750–1756). During this time the Metropolitan Council was preparing to replace the fleet with permanent buses similar to those on the A Line. These buses 6 40' Gilligs (8020-8025) entered service in December 2022. These 6 buses still are mainly used in Red Line service but will also serve the A Line, the Red Line will also use buses from the A Line (8000-8015).

== Stations and transit way ==
Cedar Avenue was reconstructed with new bus shoulder lanes for easier travel between Downtown Minneapolis and Lakeville. The transit way begins at Mall of America and heads towards Eagan, Apple Valley and Lakeville with bus shoulder lanes on both sides of Cedar Avenue, making it easier to bypass traffic. Stations were designed with bus pull-offs to allow buses to pass other buses picking up and dropping off passengers. Buses in the 12 feet (3.7 m) reinforced shoulder lanes are allowed to travel up to 15 miles per hour (24 km/h) faster than regular traffic as long as they are within the speed limit.

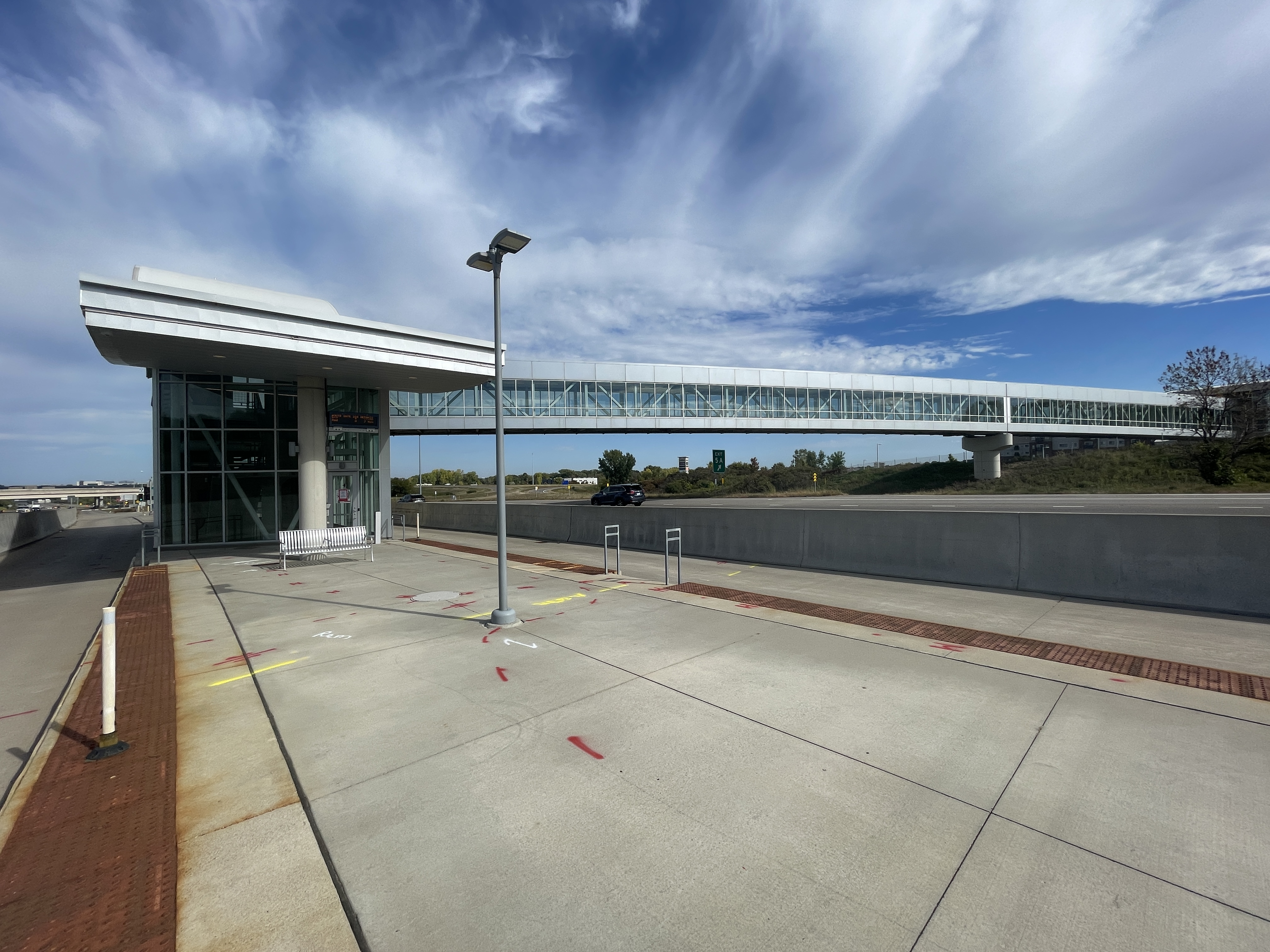
A view from the Cedar Grove Transit Station at the platform in the median of Minnesota State Highway 77

At Cedar Grove, buses used to exit the highway to use Cedar Grove Transit Station. This routing added about 10 minutes on a round trip which lowered ridership. A center-median Cedar Grove station serving the Red Line opened May 20, 2017. This reduced travel time, as buses no longer exit the freeway. The 300-foot climate-controlled walkway over Cedar Avenue connects the new station to the existing transit station. The passenger platform and walkway cost $15 million with $10.4 coming from the Counties Transit Improvement Board, $3.3 from the state of Minnesota, and $1.3 million from Dakota County. The addition of the station was estimated to add 40,000 annual rides to the Red Line and save $293,000 in annual operational costs.

Stations at 140th St and 147th St were included to serve local businesses and neighborhoods. Apple Valley elected officials were concerned about the lack of parking lots at the stations and that riders would park at local businesses and side streets. After population and employment projections for the corridor were shrunk during the Great Recession, station designs shrunk and planned skyway connections over Cedar Ave removed due to lower ridership projections. Despite pressure from the city of Apple Valley, the Met Council and Dakota County decided to not construct skyway connections but allowed the station at 147th St to be designed to allow for a future skyway connection. Apple Valley has applied for federal funding through the Met Council to construct the 147th St skyway in 2016, 2018, 2020, and 2022 under the Transit Modernization category. The Minnesota legislature included $7 million to construct the skyway in their 2023 session. Dakota County has applied through the same funding source for a pedestrian and bicycle bridge at 140th St in 2018, 2020, and 2022. The $2.9 million project was awarded $2 million as part of the 2022 grant cycle.

A redesign of the Mall of America station was estimated to reduce travel times by 2-4 minutes.

From the route's opening on June 22, 2013, until May 19, 2017, northbound Red Line buses used to make an additional stop outside of the Mall of America at 30th Avenue Station.

Station	ID	City	Connections	Opened	Fall 2019 Weekday Ridership
Mall of America station	56873	Bloomington	METRO D Line, METRO Blue Line, 54, 345, 440, 444, 495, 515, 538, 539, 540, 542, 686	June 22, 2013	375
Cedar Grove Transit Station	56510, 56511	Eagan	440, 442, 444, 445, 475	June 22, 2013	108
140th Street station	48976, 48977	Apple Valley	440	June 22, 2013	23
147th Street station	48179, 53494	Apple Valley	440	June 22, 2013	58
Apple Valley station	56979, 56980	Apple Valley	420, 440, 442, 447, 475, 477, 480	June 22, 2013	177

== History ==
Corridor logo from 2007

Plans for bus rapid transit in the corridor were first started in 1999 with $500,000 in state funding. An extension of the then in development Hiawtha Avenue light rail (Blue Line) was considered and was projected to attract the most riders with up to 23,100 by 2020. Exclusive bus only lanes for the corridor would have cost a fraction of the light rail extension but only attract up to 18,400 riders a day by 2020. Both ridership projections were contingent on dense transit-oriented development along the corridor. Studies on the corridor were extended to Lakeville in 2003 with 2025 ridership expected to be 12,900. Bus rapid transit was selected as the preferred alternative over light rail in 2004. A light rail line was estimated to cost $650 million. A 2010 report estimated 150,000 daily vehicles on Cedar Avenue with volumes expected to double within 20 years. At the Minnesota River crossing, 90,000 vehicles traveled on the Cedar Avenue Bridge. Congestion in the corridor was expected to increase and the Red Line was planned to assist with easing congestion. Construction on upgrades to Cedar Avenue were started in April 2009 and included upgrades for buses, lane expansion for automobiles, and wider sidewalks for pedestrians.

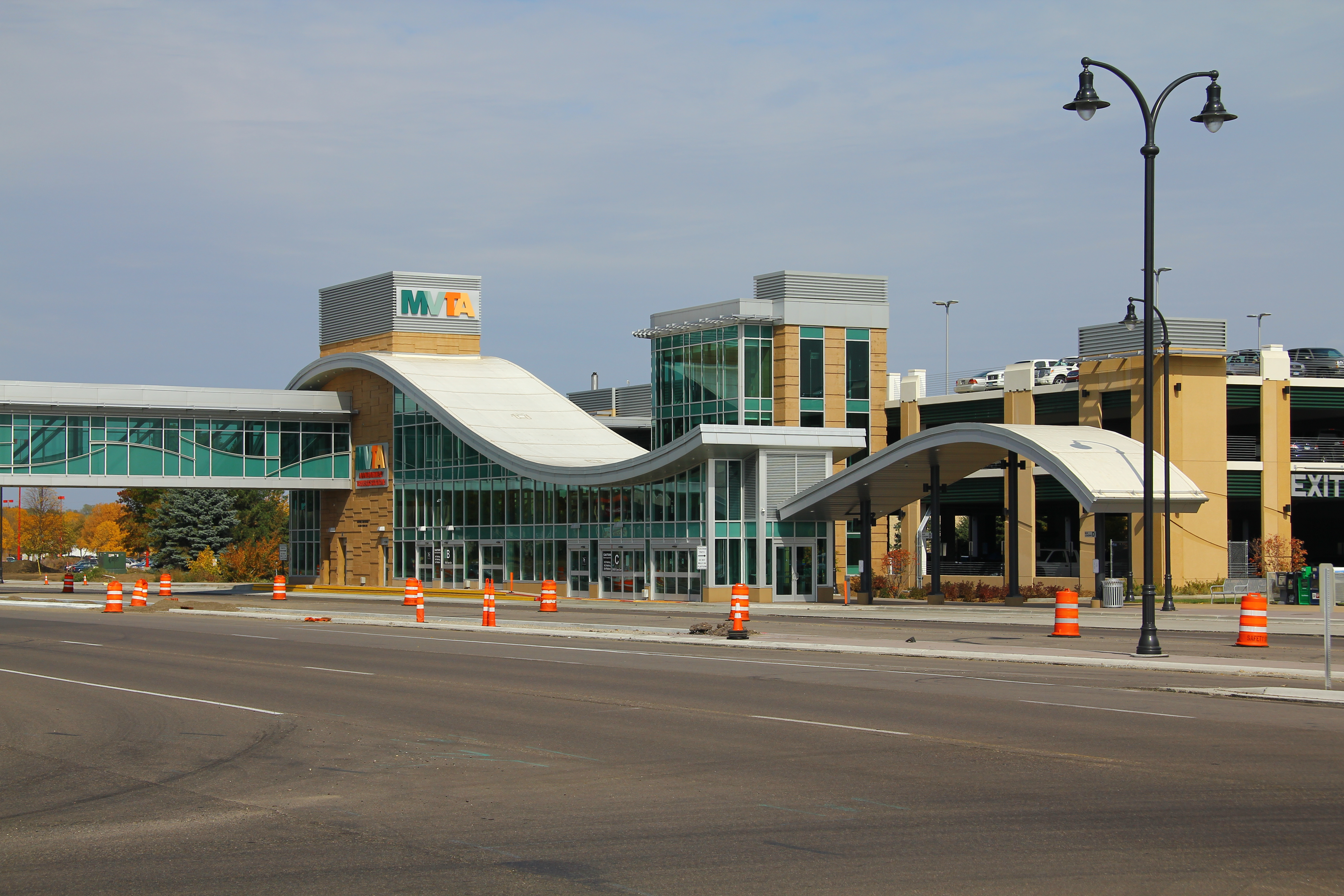
Apple Valley Transit Station, which also serves other local and express routes, under construction in October 2012 before opening.

The total cost for the project was $112 million. Only $21 million was for the Red Line itself with $34 million spent on express service upgrades and $57 million spent on roadway expansion. The majority of the project cost (80%) was split 3 ways with the federal government, the state of Minnesota, and the Counties Transit Improvement Board each covering $19.7 million. The remaining 20% of the project budget was covered by counties and local government.

In July 2011, the Metropolitan Council officially designated the Cedar Avenue BRT line as the Red Line. This is part of a broader scheme to designate transit lines by color. Corresponding lines within the system include the Blue Line, the Green Line, and the then under development Orange Line BRT along Interstate 35W. Dakota County commissioners were not pleased with the branding design decision and sought a more "vibrant" logo and design separate from light rail and regular buses. As late as spring 2012 a November 2012 opening was expected but the line ultimately opened on June 22, 2013, with free rides offered for the first week.

City officials believed that the Red Line factored into some real estate developers' decisions to develop projects worth $273 million within .5 miles (800 m) corridor. A 2015 Cedar Avenue Transitway Implementation Plan Update set plans for additional stations and an extension to Lakeville, Minnesota. The extension to Lakeville isn't planned to open until 2040.

== See also ==
- Metro Transit
- Metro Blue Line
- Metro Orange Line
