= Minnesota Valley Transit Authority =

Public transportation agency in Minnesota, US

- Founded: 1990
- Headquarters: Burnsville, Minnesota
- Locale: Minneapolis–Saint Paul (southern region), including: Apple Valley; Burnsville; Eagan; Prior Lake; Rosemount; Savage; Shakopee; Lakeville (Note: Lakeville is not a member city of the MVTA, however there is one express route, Route 477, that serves Lakeville Cedar Park and Ride.)
- Service type: Bus
- Routes: 30
- Fleet: 160
- Daily ridership: 4,800 (weekdays, Q1 2026)
- Annual ridership: 1,326,800 (2025)
- Operator: Schmitty and Sons
- Executive Director: Luther Wynder
- Website: mvta.com

The Minnesota Valley Transit Authority, also known by the acronym MVTA, is a public transportation agency that serves seven communities in the southern portion of the Minneapolis–Saint Paul metropolitan area. The agency provides fixed-route and demand-responsive transit within the service area of the communities and to select destinations in the region.

MVTA was one of several transit agencies created by suburban communities in the Twin Cities who chose to "opt-out" of the regular route transit system operated by Metro Transit's predecessor, MTC. The suburban cities decided to opt-out due to disputes over the value of transit service they were receiving in receiving compared to the amount of property taxes they were paying. The original service area consisted of six suburbs but has now grown to seven suburbs all located south of the central cities of Minneapolis and Saint Paul. The agency's name refers to the river valley along the Minnesota River in the region.

The agency offers local buses through the communities and to select destinations north of the agency's service area, as well as express bus service to downtown Minneapolis, Saint Paul, and the University of Minnesota. Demand response transit service is also offered within select service area communities. Two regional transitways, the Metro Orange Line and Metro Red Line, extend into MVTA service area but are operated by Metro Transit. In 2025, the system had a ridership of 1,326,800, or about 4,800 per weekday as of the first quarter of 2026.

== History ==
The six cities of Apple Valley, Burnsville, Eagan, Prior Lake, Rosemount, and Savage voted to leave the MTC service area in 1989. In the prior year, the cities paid roughly $3 million in property taxes to MTC but only received $2 million in transit service in return. By opting out of the MTC system, they were allowed to spend 90% of the transit property taxes generated in their communities on transit service within their cities. Initially, goals were to add additional trips on routes with one trip so that each route had at least 3 trips, and creation of a dial-a-ride service. In March 1990, MVTA sought bids to operate their bus service, and in January 1991 routes began operating under MVTA branding while still being operated under contract by MTC. At first, no trip times or route changes were instituted but some changes were under consideration for spring or summer. At the time there were three routes to Saint Paul, and six routes to Minneapolis. After only six weeks of service, MVTA along with the other six opt-out communities rallied against budget cuts impacting their transit systems. The budget cuts were instituted by a state-wide budget decrease of 3% and passed down through the Regional Transit Board, which oversaw all transit operations in the Twin Cities. The budget cuts impacted all transit operations within the Twin Cities with opt-out communities losing $185,000 or roughly 5% of the total amount of money cut. At that time most opt-outs were operating under budgets that drew less than their 90% share of available transit property taxes. After consultation with the Regional Transit Board's attorney, budget cuts were tabled with the understanding that the Regional Transit Board had overstepped its authority to institute budget cuts and impinge on the independence of the opt-out communities.

While MVTA hoped to increase service in 1991, they were unable to because the existing amount of service provided by MTC covered the full budget allotment available from their transit property tax revenue. Between 1989, when independence from the MTC system was studied, and 1991, MTC added 19 round trips from MVTA communities for a total of 85 daily round trips. Service was provided by a fleet of 45 buses. While the service in 1989 cost around $2 million, the additional service covered the fully $2.9 million in revenue dedicated to transit within the MVTA service area. By April 1992, MVTA was operating 88 round trips and ridership for March improved from 67,200 to 76,700 year-over-year. MVTA served 1,470 riders each weekday by 1993, and offered suburb-to-suburb service with several of the five suburban only routes terminating at the recently built Mall of America. MVTA along with ten suburbs and Dakota County participated in a "High-Speed Bus Coalition" to study high speed transit service along freeways with feeder local bus service in 1993. Interstates 494 and 35W were both discussed as corridors for improved service. I-35W is the main thoroughfare between the communities and downtown Minneapolis and at the time was under consideration for a light rail line. While MVTA provided 1,085 parking spaces for riders throughout their system, 97% were full which led to the Regional Transit boarding funding projects to improve park-and-ride locations in Apple Valley, Burnsville, and Eagan. Demand for more spaces was projected as needing 300 more spaces in 1993 and 700 more spaces by 1996. A need for a 500-space park-and-ride lot in Burnsville by I-35W were identified but no timeline for construction had been established.

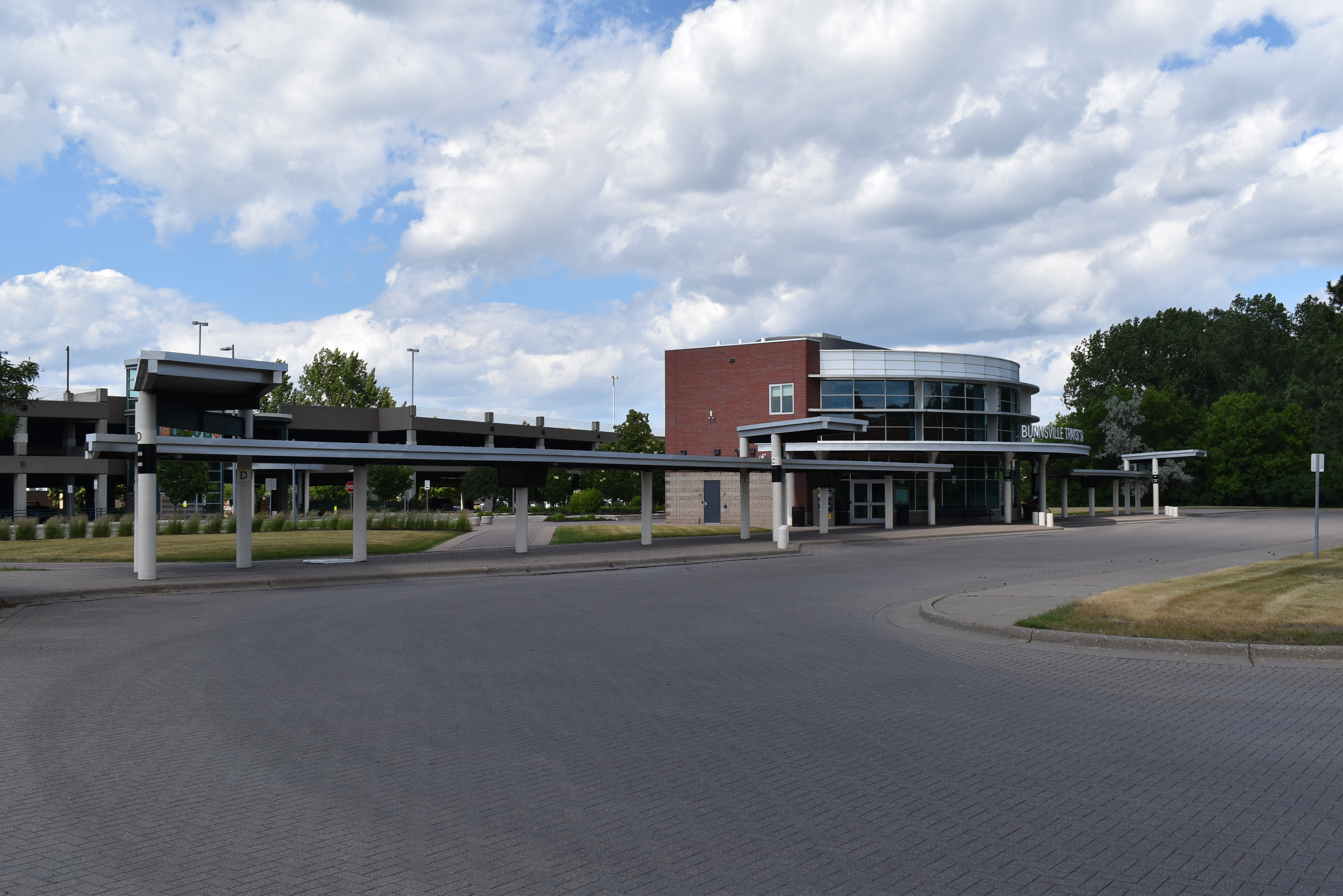
Burnsville Transit Station was the first major transit station constructed by MVTA.

A year later in 1994, the new park-and-ride lot in Burnsville near I-35W was slated for construction in that same year. The 550-space lot with room for expansion would quadruple the previous lot. Burnsville Transit Station opened in 1995 and its combination of many parking spaces, indoor waiting area, space for additional businesses nearby was the first in the Twin Cities. Other opt-out communities followed suit with construction of park-and-rides in Maple Grove, Plymouth, and Eden Prairie. MVTA would follow the same format of large park-and-ride lot with easy access to highways and space for additional businesses in facilities at Apple Valley Transit Station and Eagan Transit Station which both opened in 2001 and 2003 respectively.

In the mid-1990s, MTC had been renamed to MTCO and faced budget cuts which caused cuts in service and the need to raise fares. Opt-out transit providers like MVTA were largely immune from Metro Transit cuts because they did not rely on state and federal funding. In 1995 MVTA expected to provide 1.2 million rides and was the largest of the opt-out providers. An 18-day strike by Amalgamated Transit Union in October 1995 suspended all commuter express routes. The commuter express routes were operated by MTCO under contract from MVTA. While transit ridership for MTCO declined after the strike, MVTA ridership increased by December 1995. The 5,130 rides provided each weekday in December were 55 percent more than four years ago when MVTA first started providing service.

A tweak in state law in 1996 allowed opt-out providers to directly levy their own taxes for transit rather than collect them through the Metropolitan Council. MVTA began operating an express bus route from Burnsville Transit Station to the I-494 strip in Bloomington and Edina. The route performed poorly, just as when MTC operated the same route but eventually eliminated it.

== Service Area / Agency Governance ==
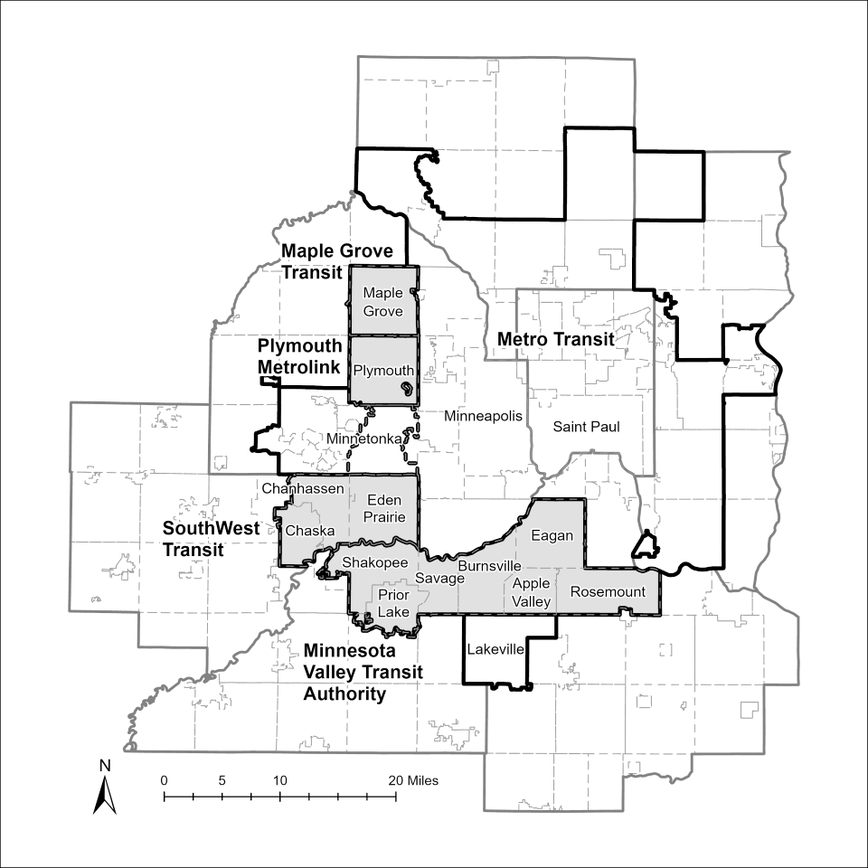
MVTA service area communities

The MVTA service area currently includes the cities of Apple Valley, Burnsville, Eagan, Lakeville and Rosemount in Dakota County; and the cities of Savage, Shakopee and Prior Lake in Scott County. MVTA also provides service from these areas to key destinations in the cities of Minneapolis and St. Paul, as well as the Mall of America in Bloomington.

MVTA's service is designed primarily to transport passengers from the residential suburbs within its service area to job and activity centers in Minneapolis and St. Paul. While the majority of the agency's ridership is concentrated during peak periods of travel (rush hour), MVTA service operates seven days per week and up to 18 hours per day on some routes.

MVTA is governed by an eight-member board, each member representing the governing body of a member jurisdiction, plus one at-large member and several ex officio members.

In 2002, the City of Prior Lake withdrew membership from the MVTA. Prior Lake rejoined and the city of Shakopee joined MVTA in September 2014 with service in those areas beginning in 2015.

In 2013, the MVTA started providing service to Lakeville, even though it is not a part of the agency's service party.

== Transitway Connections & Other Operations ==
=== BlueXpress ===
BlueXpress logo, used 2007 to 2015 MVTA merger

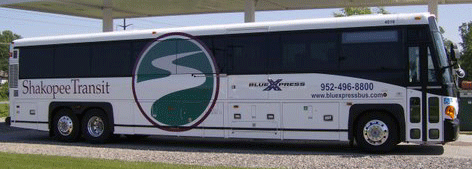
BlueXpress buses prior to 2015

BlueXpress was a public transit service operated by the two cities of Prior Lake and Shakopee. It consisted of five bus routes, the 490, 491, 492, 496, and 498. In September 2014, the two cities reached a deal with the MVTA to merge their services. As of January 1, 2015, all former BlueXpress routes are now operated by the MVTA.

=== Connect ===
MVTA Connect is a demand-responsive transit service. The service launched June 3, 2019, with service just in Savage and western Burnsville but has expanded over time. Service is offered seven days a week and serves the cities of Apple Valley, Burnsville, Eagan, Rosemount, and Savage. The service is offered via a smartphone application where customers/users can book rides. In January 2022, around 6,700 rides were taken using the service.

=== METRO Red Line ===
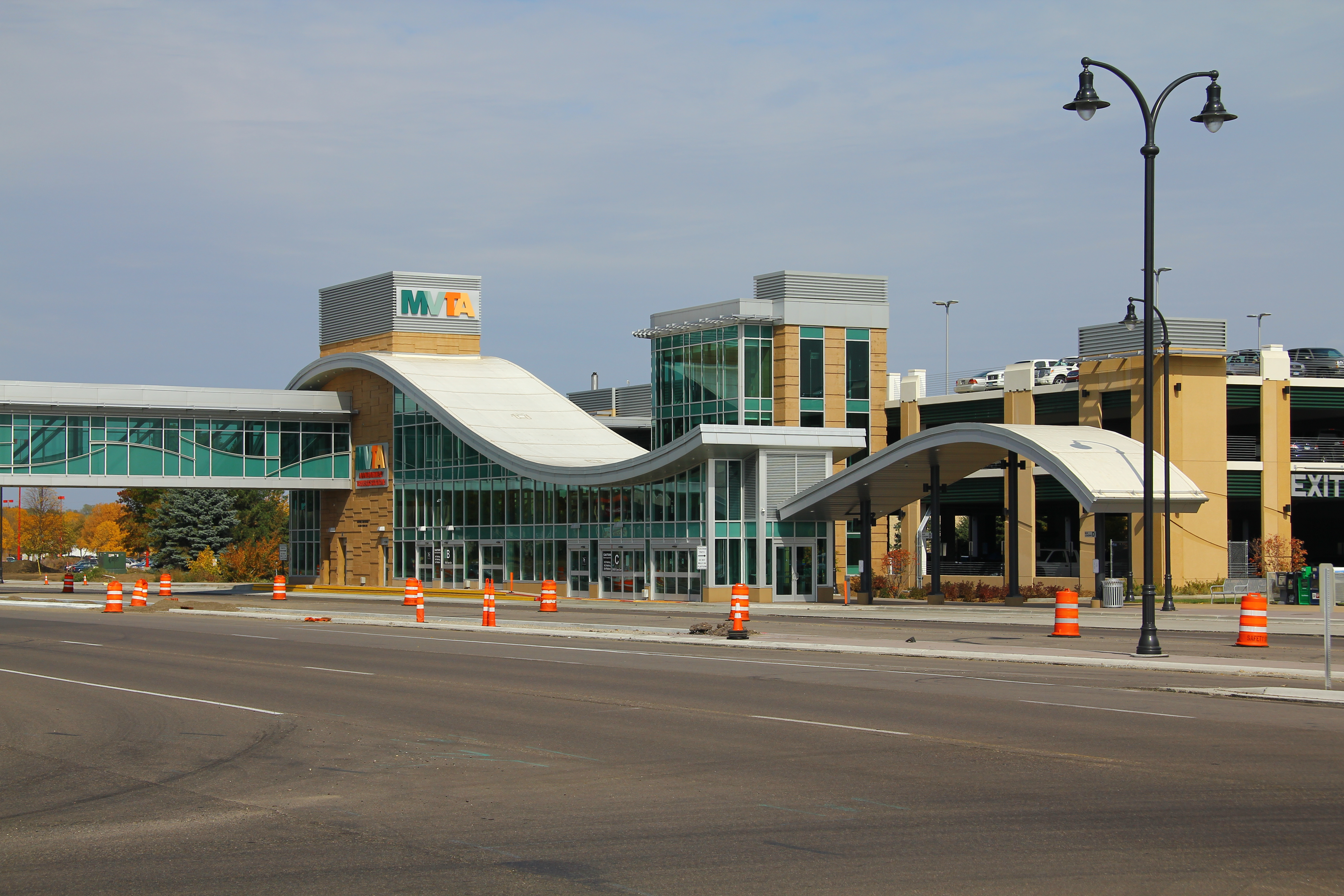
Apple Valley Transit Station serves as the southern terminus of the Red Line and can be seen here under construction in 2012 before opening.

The Metro Red Line is a bus rapid transit line running along Cedar Avenue (State Highway 77/County Road 23) from the Mall of America to Apple Valley Transit Station. Traffic congestion in the corridor led to the development of transit and roadway improvement plans. The entire project involved the creation of the Red Line for $21 million, express bus improvements costing $34 million, and roadway improvements costing $57 million for a total project cost of $113 million.

The Red Line operates largely in MVTA territory and MVTA operated the route from opening day on June 22, 2013 with funding eventually fully provided by the Metropolitan Council. The Metropolitan Council determined it could operate the service cheaper than paying MVTA to provide the service and began operations on December 5, 2020. MVTA threatened the council with a lawsuit over not renewing the contract for operating the route.

=== METRO Orange Line ===
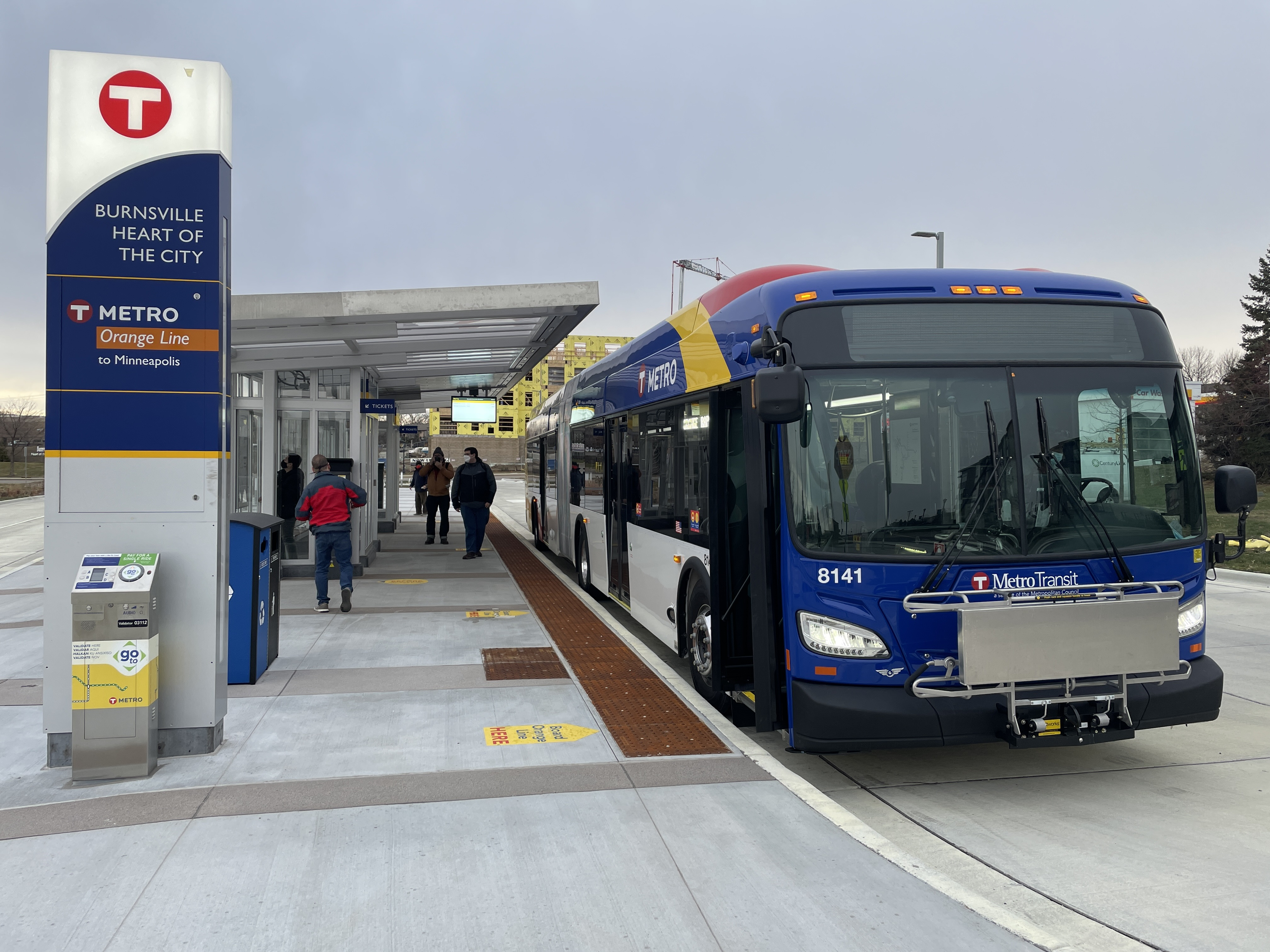
The Burnsville Heart of the City station is located in Burnsville near the Burnsville Transit Station and connects to the Orange Link local bus service.

The Metro Orange Line is a high bus rapid transit line from Burnsville to downtown Minneapolis. Transit improvements along I-35W were studied for decades with different alignments and modes of transit considered including bus rapid transit and light rail. By 2005, plans were solidified on bus rapid transit improvements. Progress on the corridor took several decades with an inline transit station at I-35W & 46th Street opening in 2010. The final corridor plan designed a route from Burnsville, Minnesota across from MN Hwy 13 and the Burnsville Transit Station to downtown Minneapolis via I-35W and some connecting streets. The Orange Line, as do many other MVTA routes, use the Marq2 transit corridor in downtown Minneapolis. MVTA buses traveling via I-35W also stop at the I-35W & Lake Street station which was created as part of the project. A groundbreaking ceremony for construction was held in July 2019 and service began on December 4, 2021.

Metro Transit operates the Orange Line while MVTA operates a route that connects with the Orange Line at the southern terminus at the Burnsville Heart of the City station.

== Bus routes ==
=== Notes ===
Routes 460, 465, 470, 472, 477, and 479 make stops at the I-35W & Lake Street station.

The Orange Link offers direct connections to the METRO Orange Line @ Burnsville Heart of the City station, with service to both Apple Valley Transit Station & Blackhawk P&R in Eagan.
Route 436 offers service from the 46th Street Station on the METRO Blue Line to Ecolab Shuman Campus, The Omni Hotel, Viking Lakes Innovation Center & TCO Stadium, with limited service to Thomson Reuters in Eagan.
Route 440 offers rush-hour service to VA Medical Center.
Routes 442 & 444 connects riders to Burnsville Center Village.
Route 447 offers bi-hourly service to & from Mystic Lake Casino at Apple Valley Transit Station.
Route 465 offers service from Burnsville to the South Bloomington Transit Center and the University of Minnesota.
Route 475 offers direct service to both the University of Minnesota and the Minnesota Zoo.
Route 489 offers service from Union Depot in Downtown St. Paul to Ecolab Shuman Campus, Boulder Lakes Business Park and Thomson Reuters in Eagan.
Route 490 offers service from Marschall Road Transit Station/Shakopee to the University of Minnesota.
Route 495 runs as an all day, 7 day express between MSP Airport, Mall of America, Burnsville and Shakopee.

=== Local Service ===
- Route 420 — (Local Route — Apple Valley to/from Rosemount)
- Route 440 — (Local Route — Apple Valley to/from Minneapolis)
- Route 442 — (Local Route — Apple Valley, Burnsville & Eagan to/from Bloomington)
- Route 444 — (Local/Limited Stop Route – Savage & Burnsville to/from Bloomington)
- Route 445 — (Local/Limited Stop Route — Eagan to/from Cedar Grove)
- Route 446 — (Local Route — Eagan to/from Minneapolis)
- Route 447 — (Local/Limited Stop Route — Apple Valley to/from Mystic Lake Casino)
- Route 4FUN/495 — (Local/ Limited Stop Route – Shakopee & Prior Lake to/from Savage, Burnsvile, Mall of America & MSP Airport)
- Route 497 — (Local Route — Shakopee)
- Route 499 — (Local Route — Shakopee)

=== Express Service ===
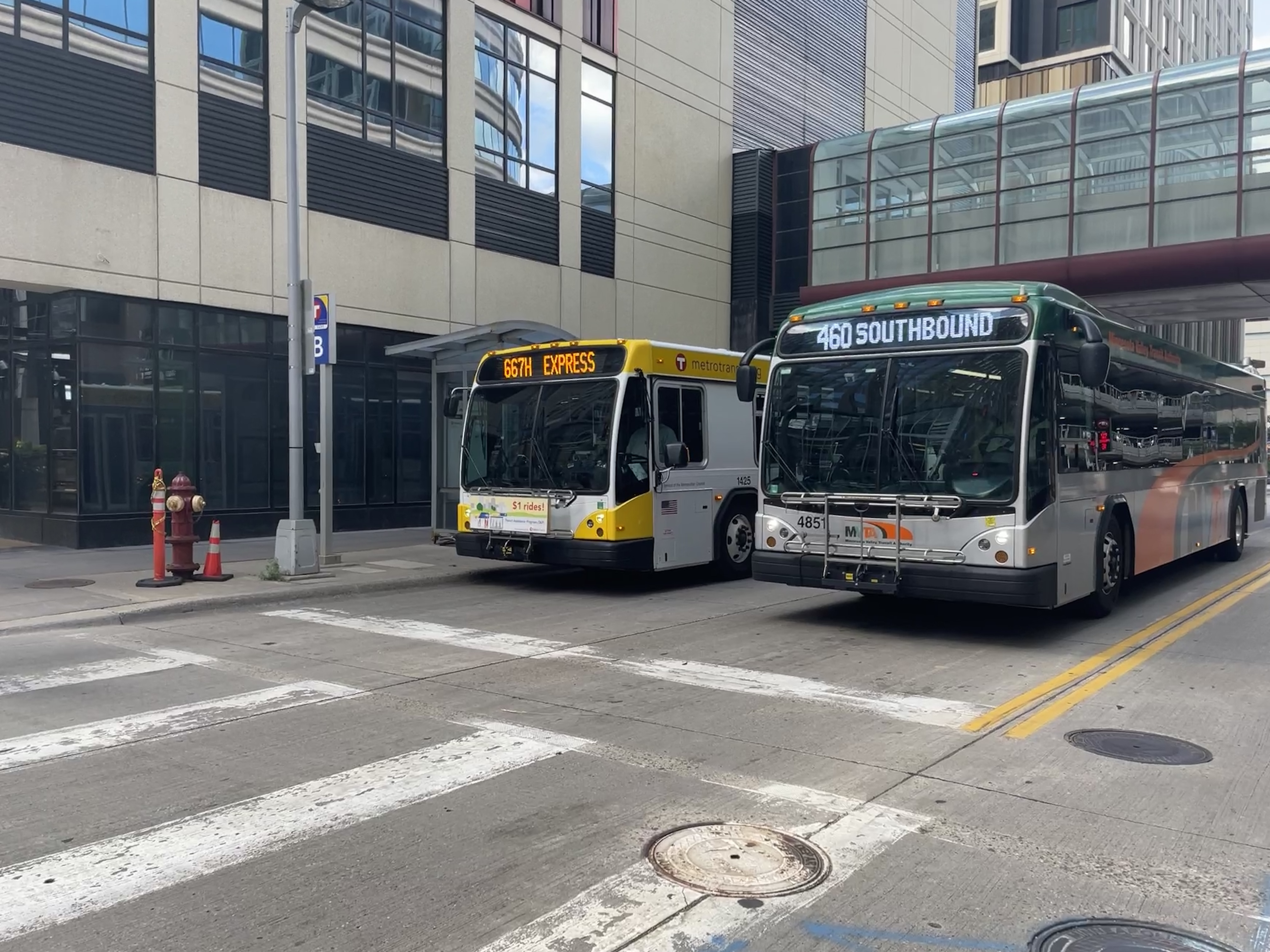
Route 460 on the contraflow bus lanes on Marquette Ave that are part of the Marq2 transit corridor

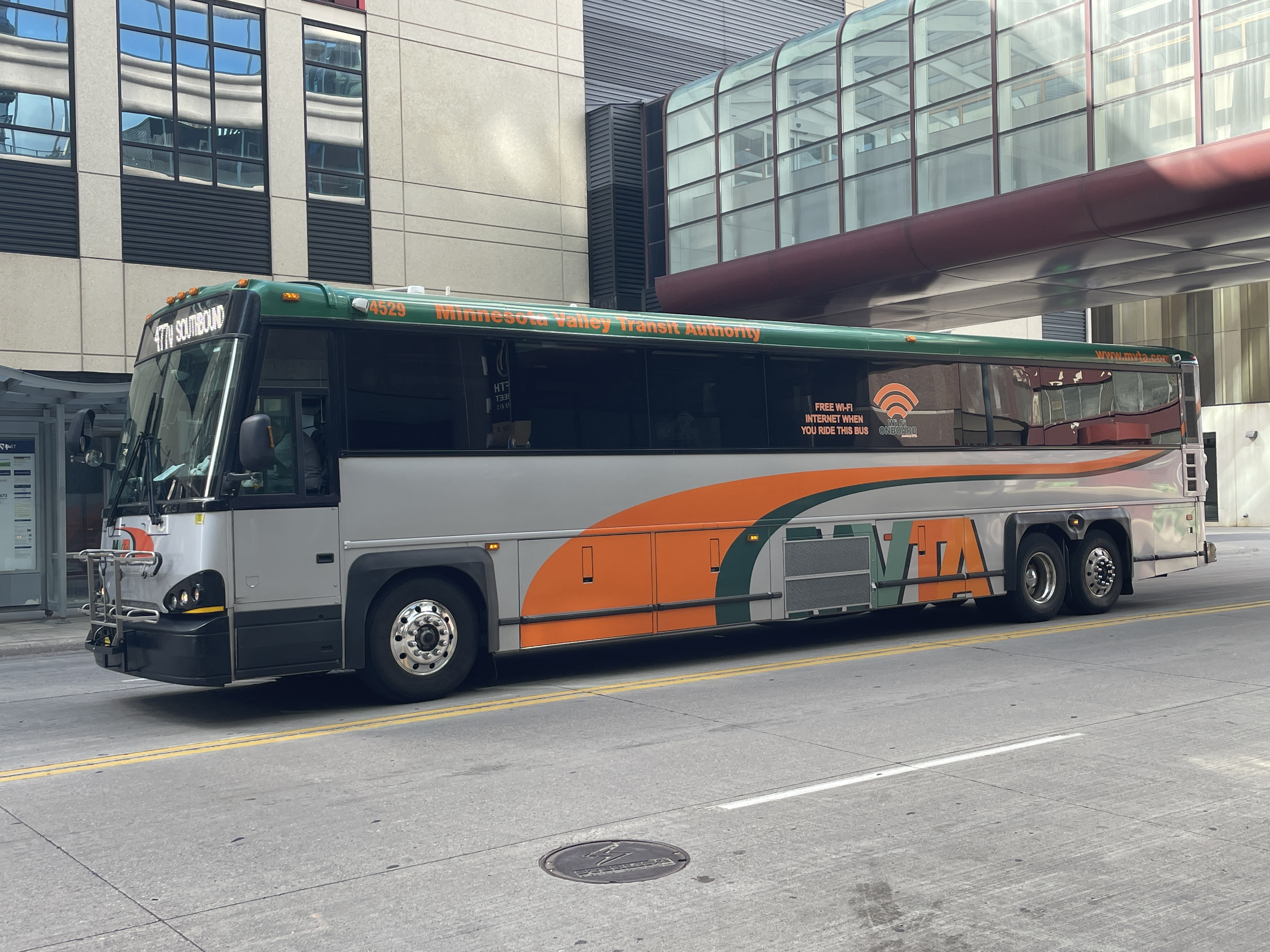
MVTA bus at Marqutte Ave and 5th St

- Route 460 — (Express Route — Burnsville to/from Downtown Minneapolis)
- Route 465 — (Express/Limited Stop Route — Burnsville to/from University of Minnesota)
- Route 470 — (Express Route — Eagan to/from Downtown Minneapolis)
- Route 472 — (Express Route – Eagan to/from Downtown Minneapolis)
- Route 475 — (Express Route – Apple Valley to/from University of Minnesota)
- Route 477 — (Express Route – Lakeville to/from Downtown Minneapolis)
- Route 479 — (Express Route — Apple Valley to/from Downtown Minneapolis)
- Route 480 — (Express/Limited Stop Route — Apple Valley, Burnsville & Eagan to/from Downtown Saint Paul)
- Route 484 — (Express Route — Rosemount to/from Downtown Saint Paul)
- Route 490 — (Express Route — University of Minnesota to/from Prior Lake & Shakopee)
- Route 493 — (Express Route — Shakopee to/from Downtown Minneapolis)

=== Special Routes & Reverse Commutes ===
- Orange LINK — (Shuttle/Local Route — Burnsville Heart of the City station on the Metro Orange Line to/from Eagan & Apple Valley)
- Route 436 — (Local/Limited Stop Reverse Commute — Eagan to/from Minneapolis)
- Route 489 - (Express/Limited Stop Reverse Commute - Eagan to/from St. Paul)

== Fleet ==
As of 2026, MVTA’s bus fleet consists of the following:

- Gillig BRT 40’
- Gillig BRT 40’ Suburban
- Gillig BRT Plus 40’
- Gillig Trolley Replica BRT 40’
- MCI D4500CT

== Transit facilities ==
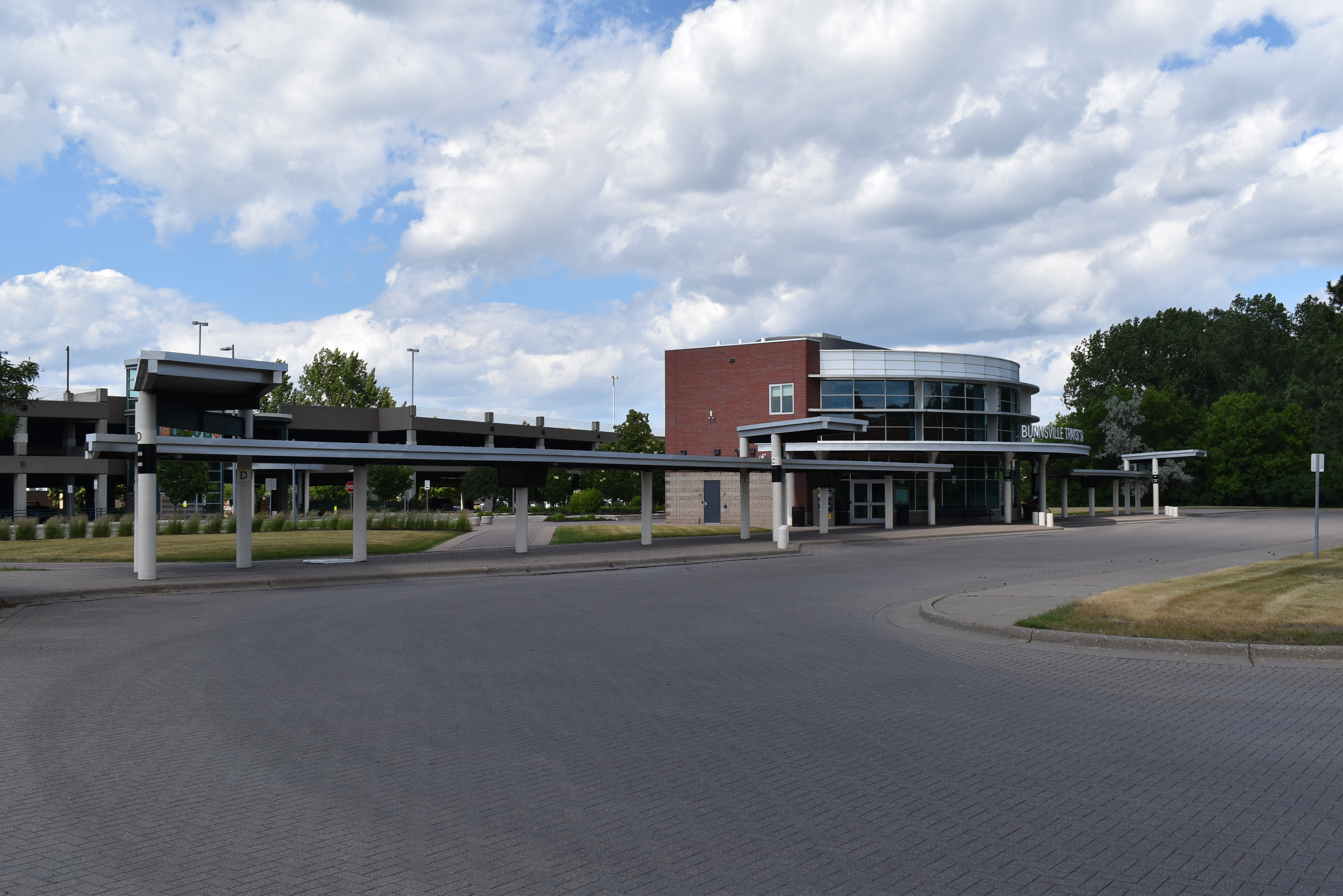
Burnsville Transit Station

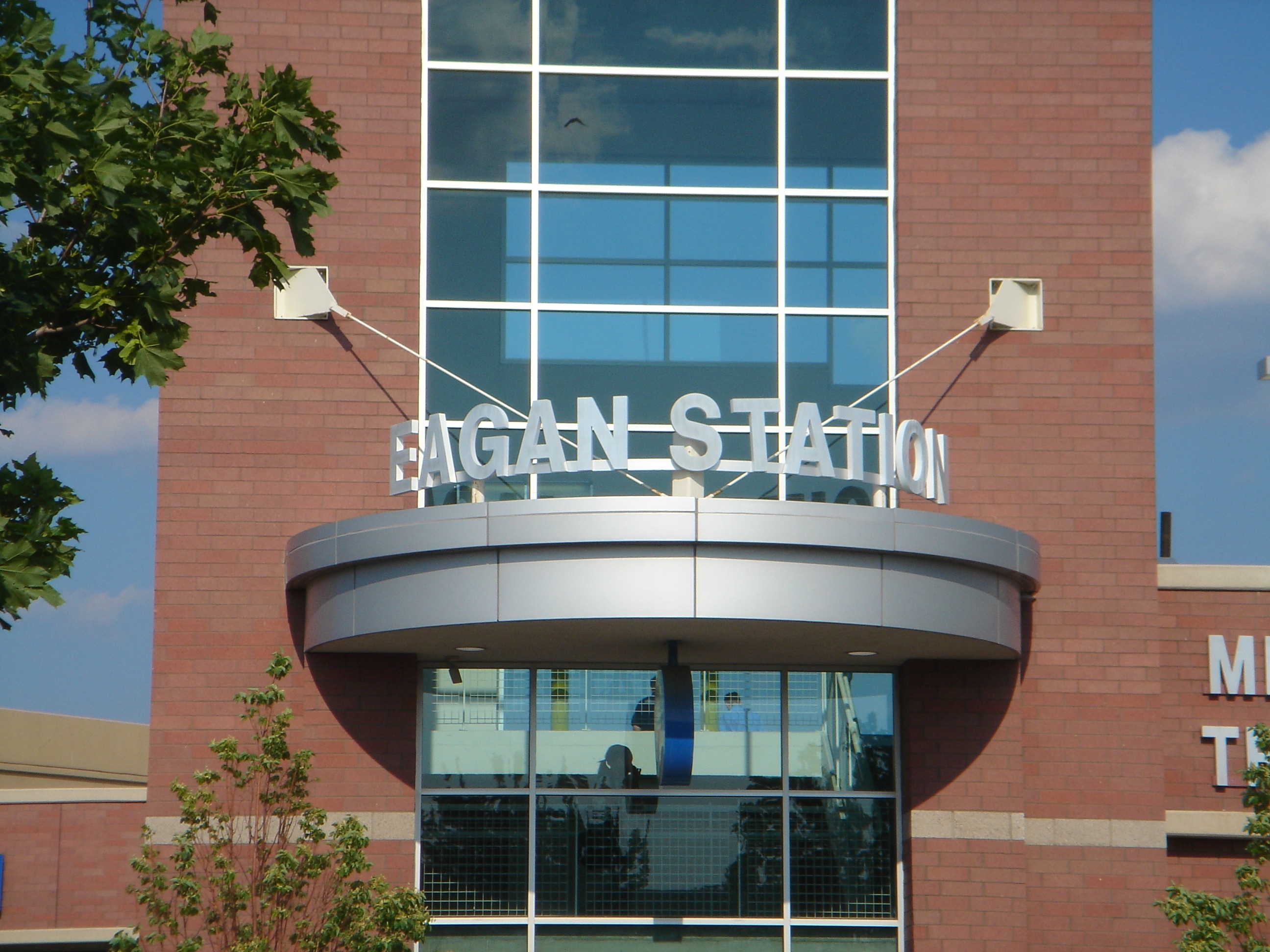
Eagan Transit Station

Minnesota Valley Transit Authority operates several park and ride facilities, often with multistory parking ramps, indoor waiting areas, and transfer opportunities to other routes.

- Palomino Hills Park and Ride (1993)
- Burnsville Transit Station (1995)
- Apple Valley Transit Station (1999)
- Eagan Transit Station (1999)
- Savage Park and Ride (1999)
- Blackhawk Park and Ride (2002)
- Heart of the City Park and Ride (2004, abandoned in 2020)
- 157th Street Station (2006)
- Southbridge Crossing Station (2007, acquired from BlueXpress merger)
- Lakeville Cedar Park and Ride (2009)
- Kenrick Avenue Park and Ride (2009, currently only serviced by Metro Transit)
- Cedar Grove Transit Station (2010)
- Rosemount Transit Station (2012)
- Eagle Creek Park and Ride (2012) (acquired from BlueXpress merger, abandoned in 2020)
- Marschall Road Transit Station (2014) (established during BlueXpress merger)

== See also ==
- Metro Transit (Minnesota)
- Transportation in Minneapolis–Saint Paul
- List of bus transit systems in the United States
