= Burnsville Center =

- Burnsville Center logo
- Location: Burnsville, Minnesota
- Opened: August 3, 1977; 49 years ago
- Developer: Homart Development
- Manager: Pacifica Burnsville
- Owner: Pacifica Burnsville
- Architect: North Architectonics
- Num. of stores: 50
- Num. of anchor tenants: 5 (2 open, 3 vacant)
- Floor area: about 1,100,000 sq ft (100,000 m^{2})
- Floors: 2 plus basement food court (1 in Dick's Sporting Goods and Gordman's)
- Public transit: MVTA
- Website: http://www.burnsvillecenter.com

Front view of the mall

Burnsville Center is located in Burnsville, Minnesota. It is one of the larger enclosed malls in Minnesota with 50 stores on 3 floors and approximately 1,100,000 square feet (100,000 m^{2}). The mall opened in 1977 with three anchor stores, Sears (closed in 2017), Dayton's (became Marshall Field's in 2001, Macy's in 2006, closed 2025), and Powers Dry Goods (became Donaldson's in 1985, Carson Pirie Scott in 1987, Mervyn's in 1995, Steve & Barry's in 2004, and then split between a former Gordman's on the first level and Dick's Sporting Goods on the second level since 2009) as anchors.

== History ==
=== 1971–1976 planning and construction ===
Sears and Powers announced jointly in May 1971 that they had acquired a 114-acre plot of land in Burnsville, Minnesota from Rimnac and Hanson with the intention of developing a regional shopping center. The land purchased was located on the southwest corner of the intersection on Interstate 35W and County Road 42. Two years later, in June 1973, plans for the Burnsville shopping center were announced by the developer, Homart Development Company, a Sears subsidiary. The mall was to be 1.4 million square feet, built at a cost of $30 million, and the largest shopping center in the area at that time. A late 1975 or early 1976 opening was anticipated. In January 1974, Homart stated that groundbreaking for the mall would be in the spring of 1974, and the mall was to be finished by late 1976. Based on a published article later in 1974, the mall's name was to be Burnhaven Shopping Center.

The mall was undergoing construction and nearing completion as planned in November 1975; while Homart expressed some concern that population growth in the area had been sluggish, along with a recession, it felt confident the mall would succeed. It was also noted during construction that the mall would have many facilities and amenities available for disabled and handicapped shoppers, which was 15 years before the Americans with Disabilities Act of 1990 became law. In late 1976, the opening date was changed to August 1977.

=== 1977 opening ===
Burnsville Center opened August 3, 1977. The grand opening celebration included Pat Paulsen, Miss USA, and Miss Minnesota. It was estimated that opening day visitors numbered 29,000, and 10,800 cars were parked. The mall was designed to house approximately 165 stores when fully leased, and opened with approximately 95 stores on opening day.

==== Stores on opening day ====
The three anchor stores on opening day were Dayton's, Powers Dry Goods, and Sears. Among the other stores open at the mall at that time were GNC, RadioShack, Jeans West, Topps & Trowsers, Berman Buckskin (later Wilsons Leather), Gallenkamp Shoes, Liemandt's, Rings 'n Things, Peck & Peck, Nina B, Cedrics, B. Dalton, Goodman Jewelers, Schaak Electronics, Thom McAn, Fanny Farmer, Toys Plus, Malings Shoes, The Banque Store, 1st Barber Stylist Company, Nutrition World, Pearle Vision, Kinney Shoes, Spencer Gifts, Desmond's Formal Wear, Artsign, National Uniform Shops, County Seat, Midland Records, Pipe Den, Unique Keepsake Diamond Center, Foot Locker, Hanover Shoe Store, Swiss Colony (later Colony Brands), Foxmoor Casuals, Waldenbooks, Record Bar, Gordon's Jewelers (later acquired by Zale Corporation), Bachman's, Morrow's Nut House, Frederick's of Hollywood, Bejeweled, Brown Photo, The Gap Gap Inc., Travel World of Minnesota, Bakers Shoes (Edison Brothers Stores), Merry-Go-Round, Kreiser Real Estate, UA Theater (later acquired by Regal Cinemas), Panache, Aladdin's Castle, Carousel Hot Dogs, Team Electronics, and Kinderfoto.

=== Late 1970s ===
One year after the mall opened, it was reported in August 1978 that J.C. Penney would be building a store and become the fourth anchor. In 1978 it was also reported that business at the mall was exceeding plans, with many tenants reporting they were pleased with their sales totals.

=== 1980s ===
By 1983, Homart had sold the mall to Corporate Property Investors of New York, and mall management had passed to Pembrook Management by 1984. Donaldson's purchased Powers Dry Goods in June 1985, resulting in the first name change for an anchor at Burnsville Center. Ultimately Donaldson's would be purchased by Carson's; later Carson's properties in the Twin Cities would sell to Dayton-Hudson (later Target Corporation) and become Mervyn's. All of these name changes were reflected on the anchor building at Burnsville Center. A local newspaper listed the top 15 malls in sales volume in the Twin Cities in 1985, and Burnsville Center placed a disappointing 7th place, even though they were the area's largest mall at the time. However, when the mall celebrated its 10th birthday in 1987, 66 of the original tenants were still at the mall, and the leasing rate was in a high 90 percentile range. 1989 saw the carpeted ramp that stretched from floor to floor removed, and replaced with stairwells and elevators. By doing this, they were able to increase the food court capacity from 180 to 490. Restrooms were also upgraded with changing stations and infant seats.

=== 1990s ===
Mall of America opened in nearby Bloomington, in 1992. Many area malls, including Burnsville Center, were concerned by the new competition, and made some adjustments in an effort to compete against the new mega-mall. Burnsville Center found that 69% of their shoppers were dual-income families, and would be better served by longer weekend shopping hours, and updated the mall's shopping hours to accommodate them. CBL & Associates purchased the 20-year-old mall from Corporate Property Investors in February 1998 for $81 million.

=== 2000s-2010s ===
2001 brought what was described as the first major renovation to the mall since its opening, 24 years before, even though there had been some updates in 1989. The renovation in 2001 introduced new stores, new carpet, a remodeled food court, carousel, sky lights, improved lighting, and other amenities. One of the store changes from 2001 was Dayton's renaming itself to Marshall Field's. After acquiring Marshall Field's, Dayton's renamed all of its existing stores to the Marshall Field's name, was reflected on the store at Burnsville Center. Later Marshall Field's parent company, Target Corporation would sell its Marshall Field stores to May Company, and it would ultimately be rebranded in 2006 as Macy's. With the closing of Mervyn's in 2004, mall management took the opportunity to update that former anchor space into two separate anchors; and in 2006 added a Steve & Barry's on the lower level, and a Dick's Sporting Goods on the upper level. It also added an exterior lifestyle center next to the Dick's entrance, constructed a 50 foot tall stone hearth fireplace, and removed the carousel which had been added five years earlier. There was speculation that Burnsville Center was at a crossroads in April 2017, as malls were becoming less traditional and needed to reinvent themselves in order to stay vital. It was noted at this time that Burnsville Center had not had additions to the mall or added any developments in 10 years, while other area malls had upgraded and made needed changes to their properties. In 2015, Sears Holdings spun-off 235 of its properties, including the Sears at Burnsville Center, into Seritage Growth Properties. Sears closed this location in September 2017 as part of its plan to close 20 stores.

On February 4, 2016, the first At Home location in Minnesota opened outside the mall.

=== 2020s ===
As of August 2020 there were approximately 90 stores and restaurants at Burnsville Center, and the Sears anchor store remained vacant. Gordman's filed for bankruptcy and their mini anchor was closed. In August 2020, CBL & Associates announced that Burnsville Center would go into foreclosure, as $64.5 million in loans was owed on the property. The facility was greatly affected by coronavirus-related shutdowns in 2020, but the mall remained open. The mall’s debt at auction was sold for $18 million in October 2020 to the Kohan Retail Investment Group. The auction did not include the JCPenney, Macy’s, or former Sears as they are separately owned. In February 2022, portions of the Burnsville Center that included Dick's Sporting Goods was purchased for $10.6 million by Pacific Square Burnsville LLC and Marshall Nguyen. As of September 2023, Pacific Square and Wyn Group purchased the remaining portion of the mall, with the exception of the three anchor stores; and has plans of redevelopment.

As of May 2023, the former Sears building sits vacant and dilapidated, and has been declared as a fire hazard by the City of Burnsville.

As of October 2023, Kohan Retail Investment Group sold the mall to Pacifica Burnsville and Wyn Group.

Burnsville Center was featured in a 2025 YouTube video by Ryan Trahan in which he documented an attempt to draw attention to the mall by setting up a temporary store selling personal items.

In January 2025, Macy's announced that its store at Burnsville Center would close in the first quarter of 2025. It closed in March 2025.

== Transit ==
The mall is also used as a transportation stop in the region, with Minnesota Valley Transit Authority bus service linking the mall to other destinations. The MVTA bus stop at Burnsville Center is located near the former Sears automotive.
