= I-35W & Lake Street station =

Bus rapid transit station in Minneapolis

I-35W & Lake St
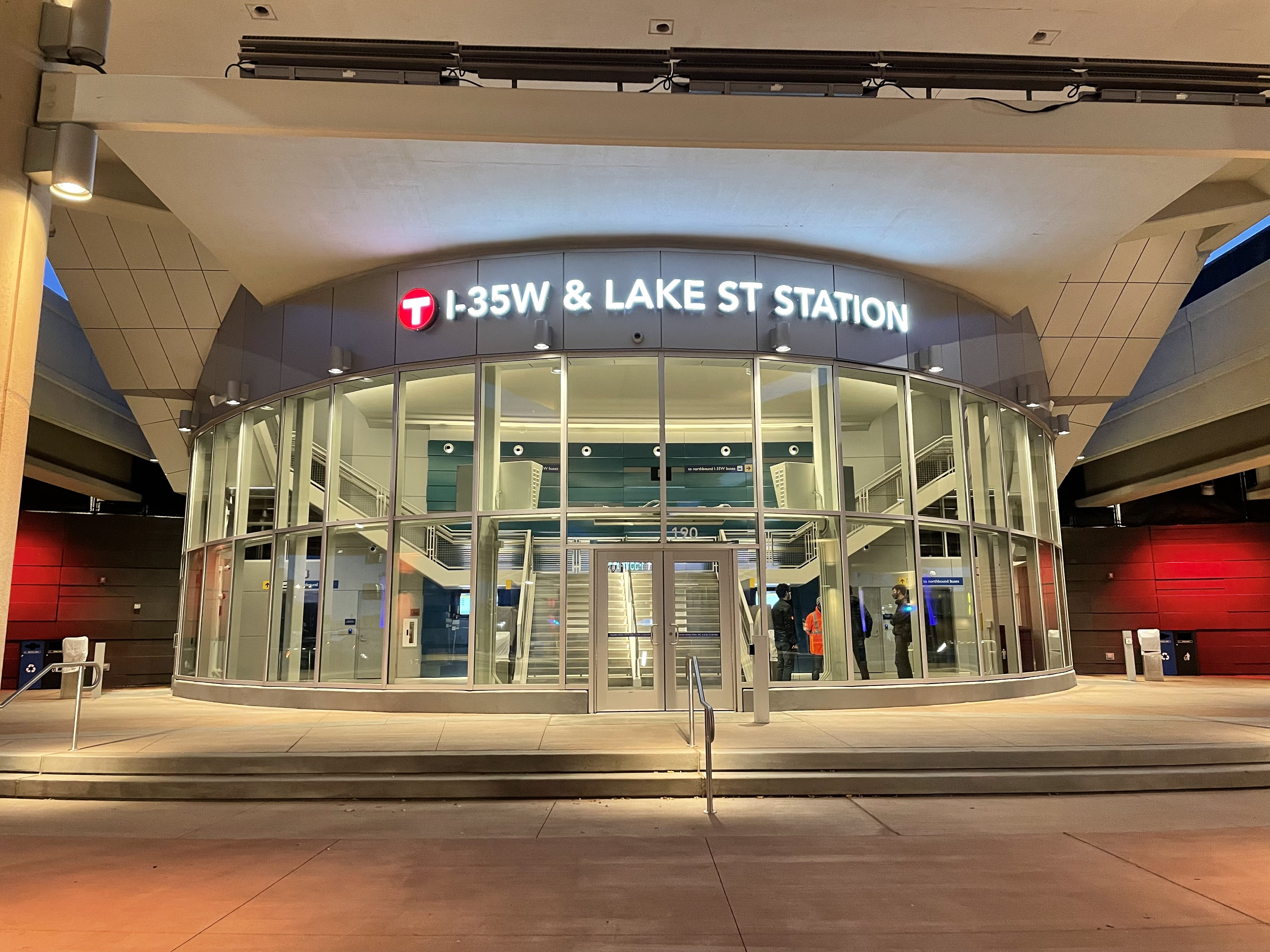
- I-35W & Lake St station entrance on opening morning

General information
- Location: 190 East Lake Street; Minneapolis, Minnesota
- Coordinates: 44°56′54″N 93°16′29″W
- Platforms: 2 side platforms
- Connections: Metro Transit: 11, 18, 21

Construction
- Accessible: Yes

History
- Opened: April 15, 1968
- Rebuilt: 2021

Passengers
- 2025: 904 daily
- Rank: 9 out of 129

Services
Preceding station	Metro	Following station
Downtown Minneapolis toward Marquette-2nd Avenue & 3rd Street-Washington	Orange Line	I-35W and 46th Street toward Burnsville Heart of the City
Lake & Nicollet toward Lake & France	B Line	Lake & 4th/5th Avenue toward Saint Paul Union Depot
Location

I-35W & Lake Street station is a bus rapid transit station along the Metro Orange Line and B Line bus rapid transit (BRT) routes in Minneapolis, Minnesota. In addition to the BRT services, the station is also served by Metro route 578, Minnesota Valley Transit Authority routes 460, 465, 467, 470, 472, 475 and 477, along with SouthWest Transit routes 600 and 695.

The current station opened on October 21, 2021, replacing a pair of on-highway bus stops along the outside lanes of I-35W at Lake Street. The station itself cost $20 million and was built as part of the 35W@94: Downtown to Crosstown reconstruction project. The new two-story station is located between I-35W over Lake Street with a transit plaza on Lake Street with a landscaped ramp connecting it to the Midtown Greenway. The old bus stops were not compliant with the Americans with Disabilities Act (ADA) since stairways were the only way pedestrians were able to access the freeway stops to and from Lake Street below. The new station is ADA-compliant with four elevators (along with ramps and stairs) for a seamless transition between either side of the busway platforms and Lake Street platforms.

== History ==
The original station opened April 15, 1968 following the completion of Interstate 35W between Crosstown (MN 62) and Interstate 94. Freeway service to the station was initially provided by Twin City Lines Route 35 Freeway Express and later Bloomington Bus Company, both providing suburban express bus service from Richfield and Bloomington to Downtown Minneapolis. The station connected with Twin City Lines frequent and heavily used Route 21 Selby-Lake along Lake Street and Selby Avenue between Uptown and Downtown Saint Paul. The Metropolitan Transit Commission (MTC), now Metro Transit, acquired Twin City Lines in 1970 and Bloomington Bus Company in 1975. Under MTC, Route 21 remained similar to its present day operation, while all express bus service along I-35W from Downtown Minneapolis were formed under Route 35 (Note: At this time, express bus routes operating along I-35E were also operated as Route 35, but were considered separate routes as Minneapolis and Saint Paul (with their respective suburbs) had route numbering independent from each other.) with several branches beginning at 35th Street. In 1972 there were 14 branches of Route 35 using the station.

By 1979 the station had transitioned from a simple transfer point to a transit hub. All-day and weekend Route 47 supplemented the rush-hour oriented Route 35 from Downtown Minneapolis to Richfield and Bloomington. The short-lived Route 49 was inaugurated as a shuttle bus between the station and Honeywell's recently completed corporate headquarters nearby at 28th Street. As transit service in the region expanded additional rush-hour buses began to use the station, including Route 94L express bus service along Lake Street to Downtown Saint Paul. After establishment in 1986 SouthWest Metro Transit, now SouthWest Transit, took over bus service in southwest suburbs and became the first operator to use the station other than MTC since 1975. Similarly in 1990 the Minnesota Valley Transit Authority (MVTA) took over bus service in the south suburbs and began utilizing the station. Following the completion of Interstate 394 in the early 1990s SouthWest Transit abandoned the station to take advantage of the reversible HOT lanes along I-394.

In 1997 Allina Health co-sponsored a study to improve access to their Abbott Northwestern Hospital campus from I-35W, considering additional freeway and transit access. The study became known as the I-35W Access Project and concluded that a new Lake Street station would be constructed, in addition to bus lanes on both the freeway level and Lake Street. Designs were completed November 2002 and recommended an island platform in the median of I-35W accessible from either side of Lake Street. Construction was anticipated to begin in late 2004. After the opening of I-35W & 46th Street station, idea of a freeway island platform was changed to side platforms in the median of I-35W after considering safety and bus throughput concerns.

In June 2004 Route 27 began operating to connect major employers (including Abbott Northwestern) along 26th and 28th Avenues between the station and the new Lake Street/Midtown station. In 2010 the 2030 Transportation Policy Plan identified that the Orange Line (then known as the I-35W Bus Rapid Transit) would open by 2012, bypassing Lake Street until a new station was constructed. That plan was later shelved after unexpected congestion at I-35W and Crosstown Highway. After the opening of the I-35W & 46th Street station, it was observed that bus drivers had difficulty maneuvering from the HOT lanes in the center of the freeway, particularly during rush-hour traffic, to the side platforms of the old Lake Street station. In 2011 northbound express bus service was modified to the Lake Street stop, reducing it to only drop-off service during non-rush hour trips.

The old station permanently closed June 9, 2018 to begin rebuilding in 2020, with a reopening date sometime between fall 2020 and winter 2021. During this time I-35W buses were detoured either via 1st and Blaisdell Avenues (Metro Transit routes) or Park and Portland Avenues (MVTA routes), with Metro Transit routes stopping at Lake Street upon request. As freeway construction progressed, routes would be brought back to I-35W, bypassing Lake Street completely as the old station platforms were demolished.

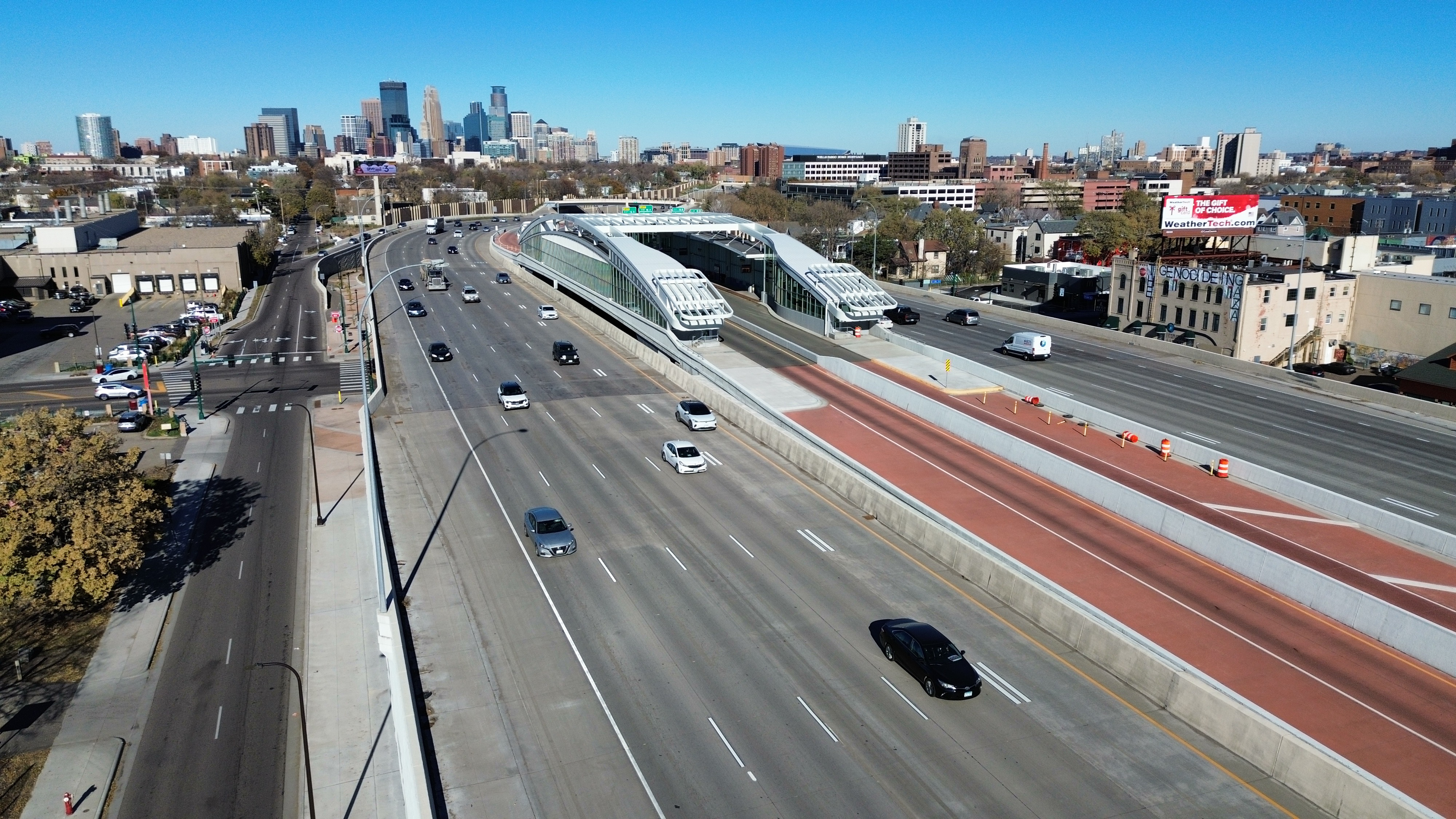
I-35W & Lake Street station from above

The new station was planned to open on October 18, 2021 with a ceremony held at the station. However, on October 16 around 7:40 p.m a driver traveling northbound on I-35W collided into the station, setting it on fire. The driver, Sean Patrick McClernon, died from multiple blunt force injuries from the collision. The opening of the station needed to be postponed to undergo safety inspection after the crash, which caused minor damage to the southeast circulation tower. The station opened on October 21 without a ceremony. Upon opening, Southwest Transit returned to the station for the first time since the 1990s. MVTA returned November 20.

Metro B Line service to the station began on June 14, 2025.

== Bus connections ==
- Routes B Line, 27, 133, 135, 146, 156, 460, 464, 465, 467, 470, 472, 475, 476, 477, and 478 (prior to March 2012)

== Gallery ==
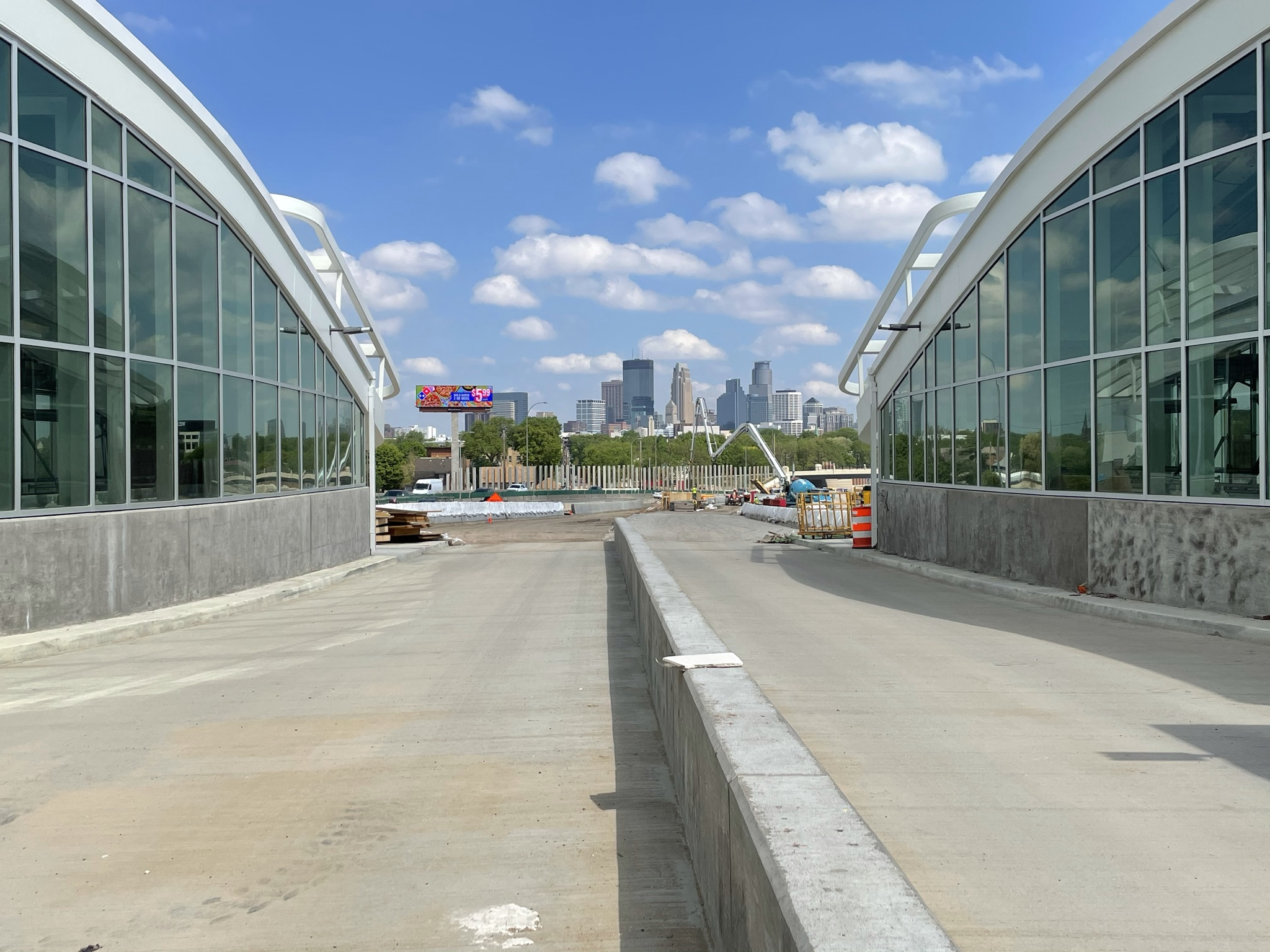
A view from the under construction Lake St Station towards downtown Minneapolis.

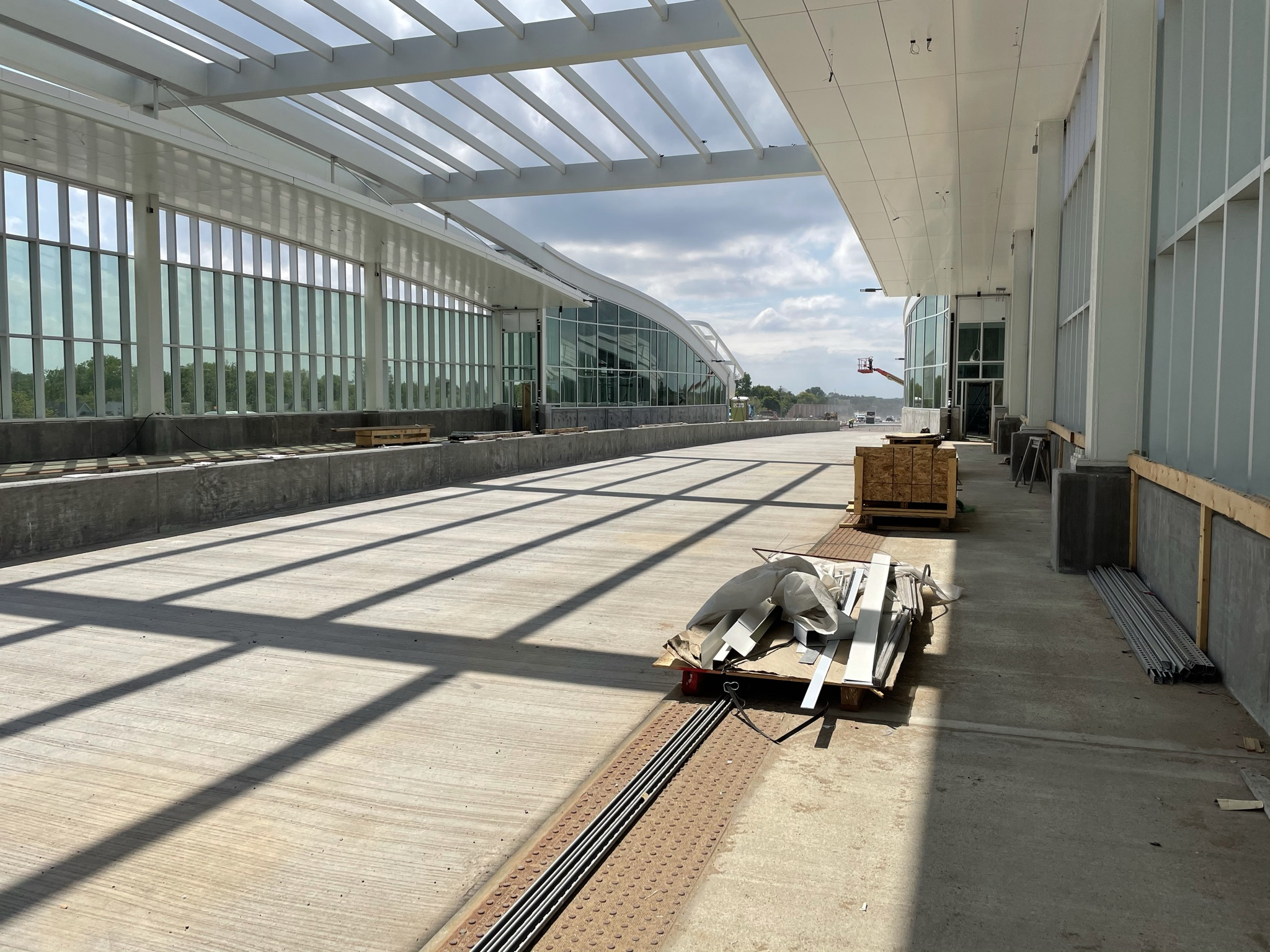
The under construction passenger boarding area of the Lake St Station.

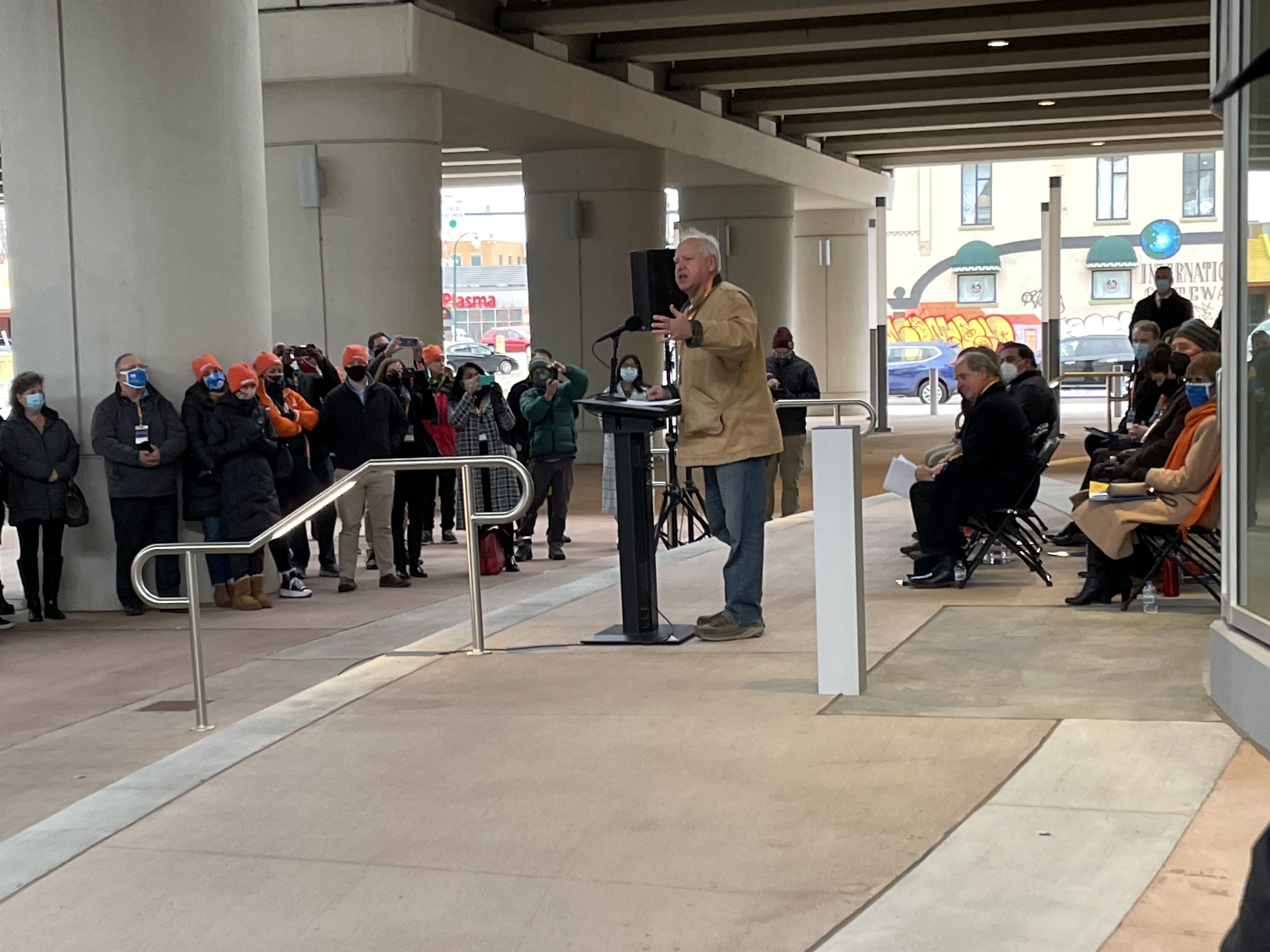
Minnesota Governor Tim Walz speaking at the opening ceremony of the Metro Orange Line.

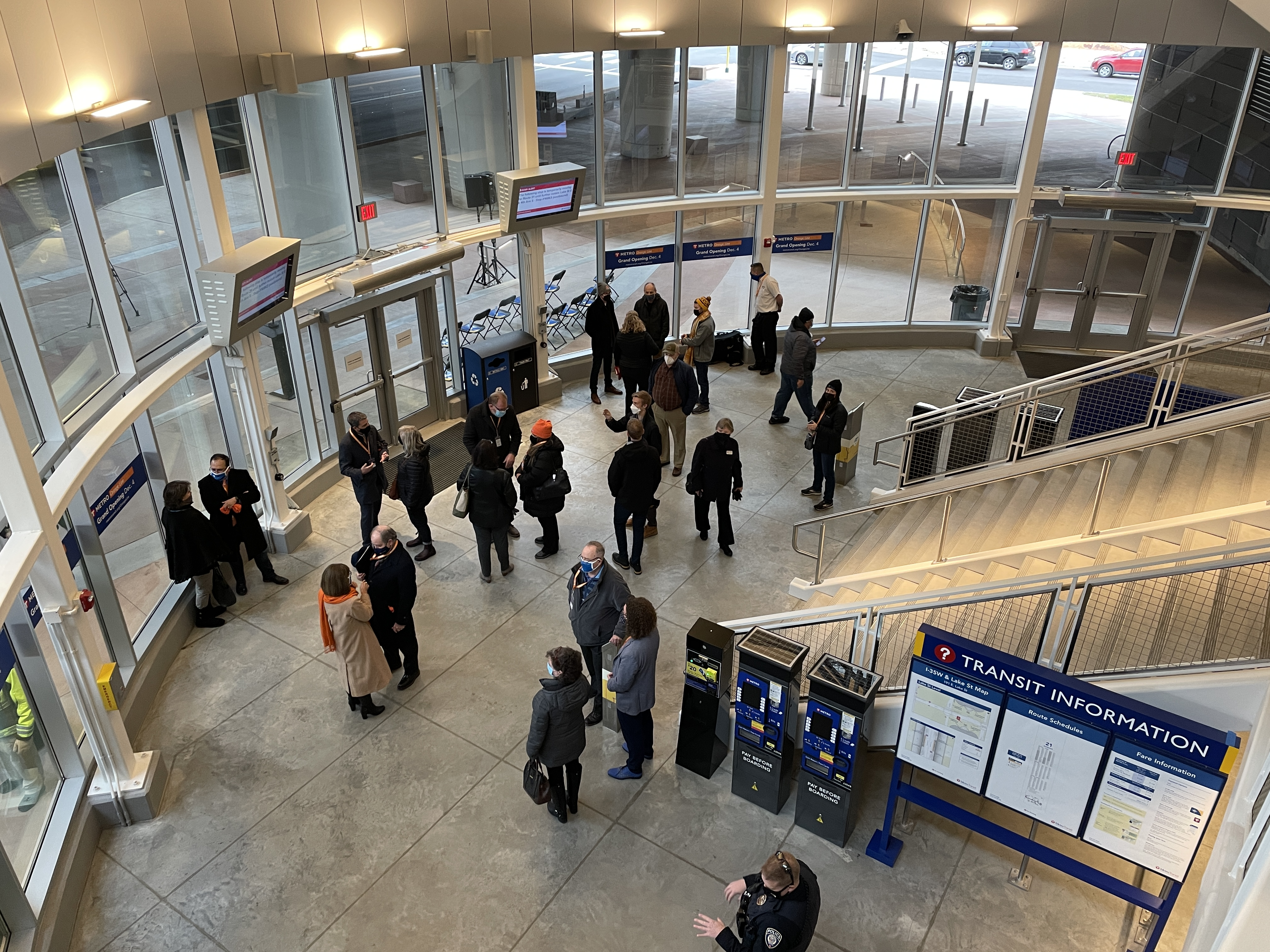
Interior of one of the entrances to the Lake Street station.
