= Whipple Building =

United States government building in Minnesota, USA

Bishop Henry Whipple Federal Building
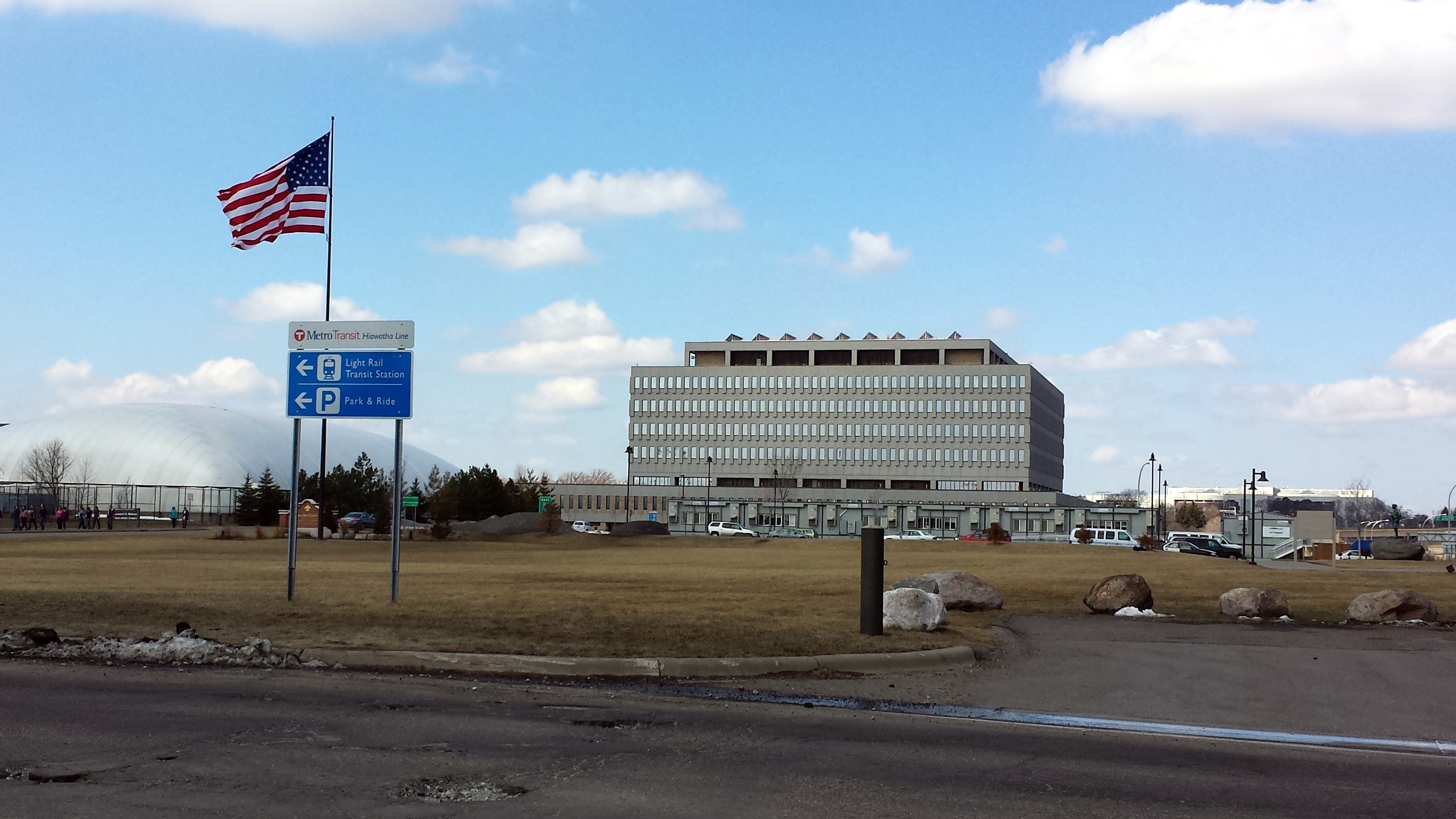
- Whipple Building in 2014

General information
- Architectural style: Modernist
- Location: 1 Federal Dr; Fort Snelling, Minnesota; United States
- Coordinates: 44°53′39″N 93°11′42″W
- Year built: 1965
- Opened: 1969
- Owner: General Services Administration

Technical details
- Floor count: 7
- Floor area: 617,600 square feet

Design and construction
- Architecture firm: Cerny Associates

Renovating team
- Architects: HGA Architects and Engineers

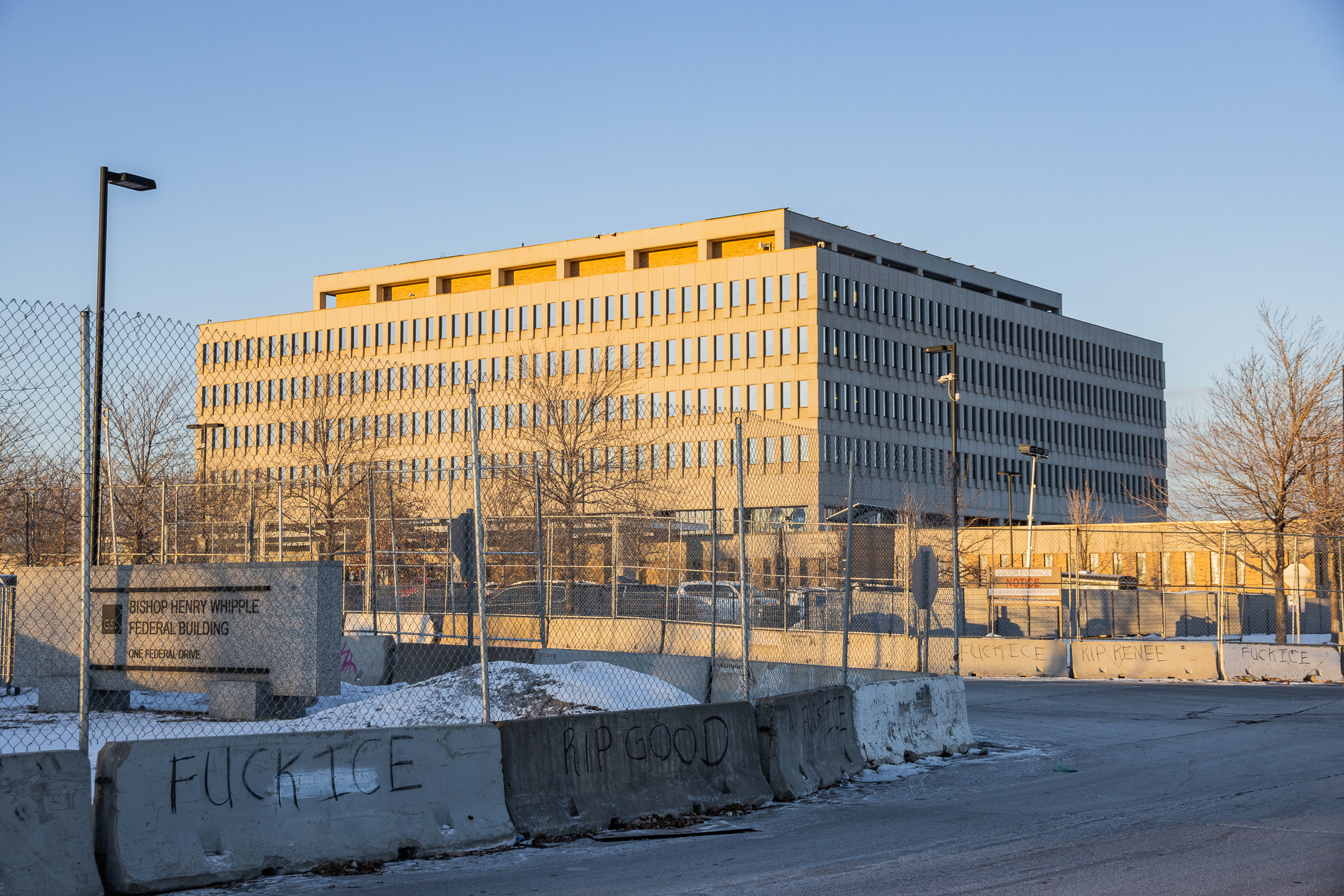
The Whipple Building in 2026 amid Operation Metro Surge. Barricades have been installed around the building.

The Bishop Henry Whipple Federal Building is a 7-story building at 1 Federal Drive, Fort Snelling, Hennepin County, Minnesota, United States, north of the Minneapolis–Saint Paul International Airport. It is named after Bishop Henry Benjamin Whipple. It is home to a number of federal offices, including a United States Immigration and Customs Enforcement (ICE) field office, and has housed others over its history. It came to prominence in 2025 as the base of operations for the United States Department of Homeland Security's (DHS) Operation Metro Surge in Minnesota. It is serviced by the Metro Blue Line Fort Snelling station.

== History ==
The building was originally built in 1965 at a cost of $14,054,807. Designed by the firm Cerny Associates, it contains 7 floors and approximately 700,000 square feet (65,000 m^{2}) of space. It houses agencies such as the United States Department of Veterans Affairs, the United States Fish and Wildlife Service, the United States Department of Defense, and the United States Department of Homeland Security. It was renovated in 2014 by HGA Architects and Engineers. The improvements earned the building LEED Gold certification.

== Bishop Whipple ==
Bishop Whipple was the first Episcopal bishop of Minnesota and interceded with President Abraham Lincoln to pardon most of the 303 Dakota people who were sentenced to death after the Dakota War of 1862. The building was named after the bishop at the request of then-Senator Walter Mondale when it opened in 1969. In 2019, the Episcopal Church in Minnesota, the Minnesota Council of Churches and other organizations initiated an effort to have Whipple's name removed from the building. Daniel Romero, a leader of the Interfaith Coalition on Immigration, was quoted as saying, "We believe that Bishop Whipple is turning over in his grave. Bishop Whipple himself would never have endorsed his name going on a building where so much fear and terror is manifested."

== Role in immigration enforcement ==
=== Immigration enforcement (ICE) protests ===
The building has been the site of several protests and demonstrations against United States Immigration and Customs Enforcement. In 2016, activists rallied for the release of eight Cambodian-American refugees, referred to as the "Minnesota 8", that had been detained by ICE. In 2018, eighteen protestors were arrested during a demonstration that had blocked the light rail tracks adjacent to the building. In July 2019, a "Lights for Liberty" vigil was held in front of the building ahead of the deployment of ICE raids in several cities. Also in July of that year, 200 mostly-Jewish activists protested at the building against ICE polices. In October 2019, protestors led by Minnesota Episcopal Church gathered at the building to demand its name be changed. In October 2025, a large protest was held at the building during a visit by DHS Secretary Kristi Noem.

=== Operation Metro Surge ===
During Operation Metro Surge, the Whipple Building became the base of operations for the surge of ICE agents, as well as the site of numerous protests, leading to clashes. This has resulted in barricades and fences being installed around the building and the regional Veterans Affairs office being temporarily closed and relocated to the Minneapolis VAHCS Medical Center. Conditions for detainees in the building during this time have been reported as being inhumane, with detainees describing crowded detention areas, and no access to food or medical care. In January 2026, Minnesota Congressional representatives Angie Craig, Ilhan Omar and Kelly Morrison were not allowed to conduct an oversight visit, with Homeland Security spokesperson Tricia McLaughlin stating that they did not provide a seven-day notice for their visit. Later that month, the Minneapolis-based group The Advocates for Human Rights filed a class action lawsuit alleging that detainees have also been denied access to legal counsel. A news organization identified eight men that were instantly rearrested after being released by a judge at the building.
