= Fort Snelling station =

Light rail station in Minnesota, United States

Fort Snelling
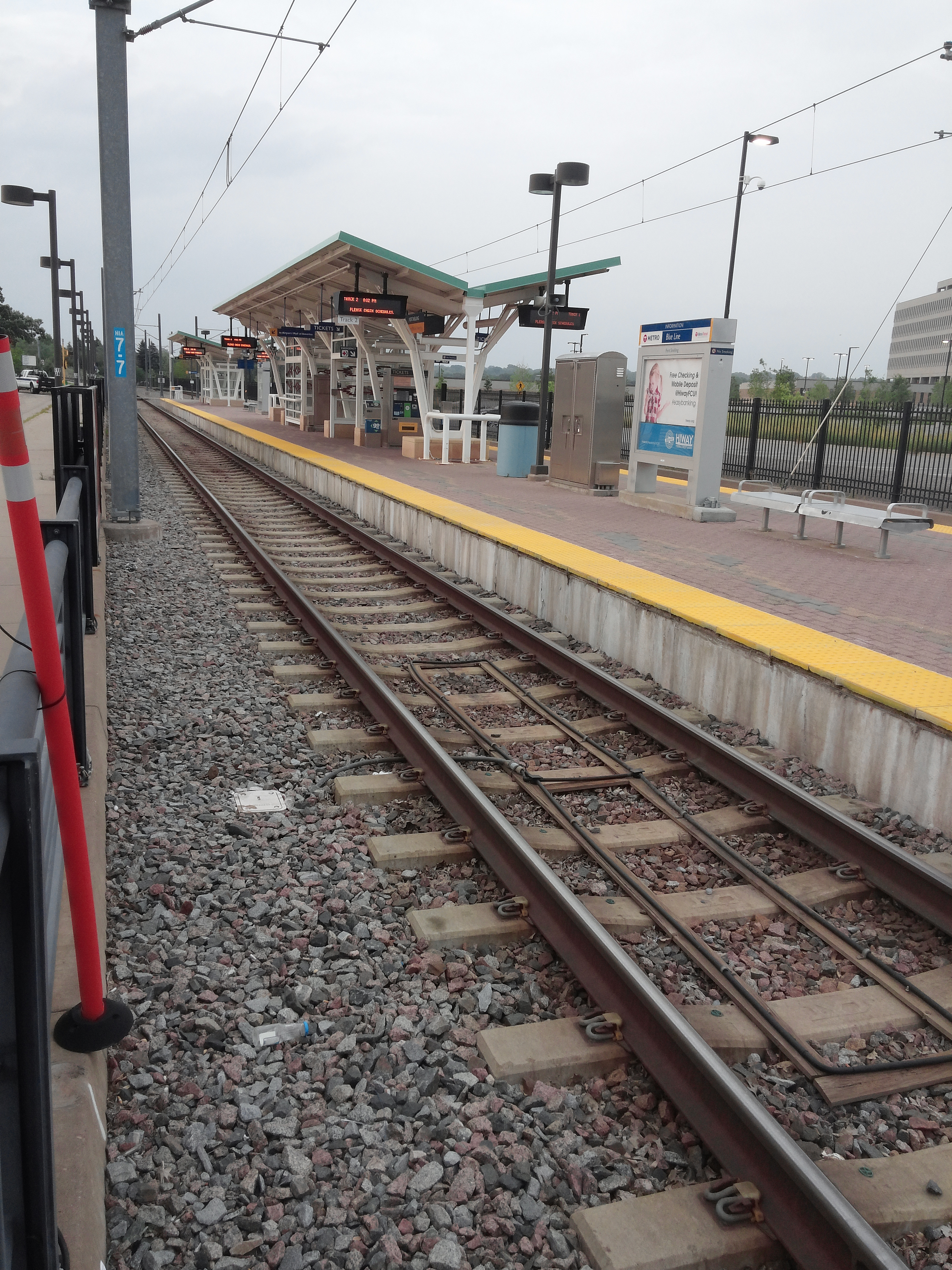
- Fort Snelling station in 2014

General information
- Location: 6053 Minnehaha Avenue; Fort Snelling, Minnesota
- Coordinates: 44°53′36″N 93°11′53″W
- Owner: Metro Transit
- Platforms: 1 island platform
- Tracks: 2

Construction
- Structure type: At-grade
- Parking: 975 spaces
- Accessible: Yes

History
- Opened: June 26, 2004

Passengers
- 2025: 443 daily ▼2.9%
- Rank: 32 out of 37

Services
Preceding station	Metro	Following station
Terminal 1–Lindbergh toward Mall of America	Blue Line	VA Medical Center toward Target Field
Location

Fort Snelling station is a light rail station on the Blue Line in the Minneapolis–Saint Paul region of the US state of Minnesota, named after the nearby Fort Snelling historic fort structure. This station is located on Minnehaha Avenue, adjacent to the Bishop Henry Whipple Federal Building and diagonally across from a U.S. Army Reserve campus and the main entrance to an Air National Guard station. The station's layout has a center-platform design. Service began at this station when the Blue Line opened on June 26, 2004. At that time, this was the southern terminus of the Blue Line. The remainder of the line, south of this station, opened on December 4, 2004.

This station is the site of a large park and ride facility. There are two parking lots, making a total of about 975 spaces available to commuters.

Just north of this station the Blue Line crosses the interchange of Minnesota State Highway 55 and Minnesota State Highway 62 on a flyover. Just south of this station, the line has a third track in the center which was used primarily for the LRVs to switch tracks when this station was the terminus of the line.

== Notable places nearby ==
- Bishop Henry Whipple Federal ("GSA") Building
- Fort Snelling historic fortification
- Fort Snelling State Park
- Campuses/facilities for the Minnesota Air National Guard; the Army Reserve, the Air Force Reserve, and the Navy/Marine Corps/Coast Guard Reserve.
