= VA Medical Center station (Metro Transit) =

Light rail station in Minneapolis, Minnesota

VA Medical Center
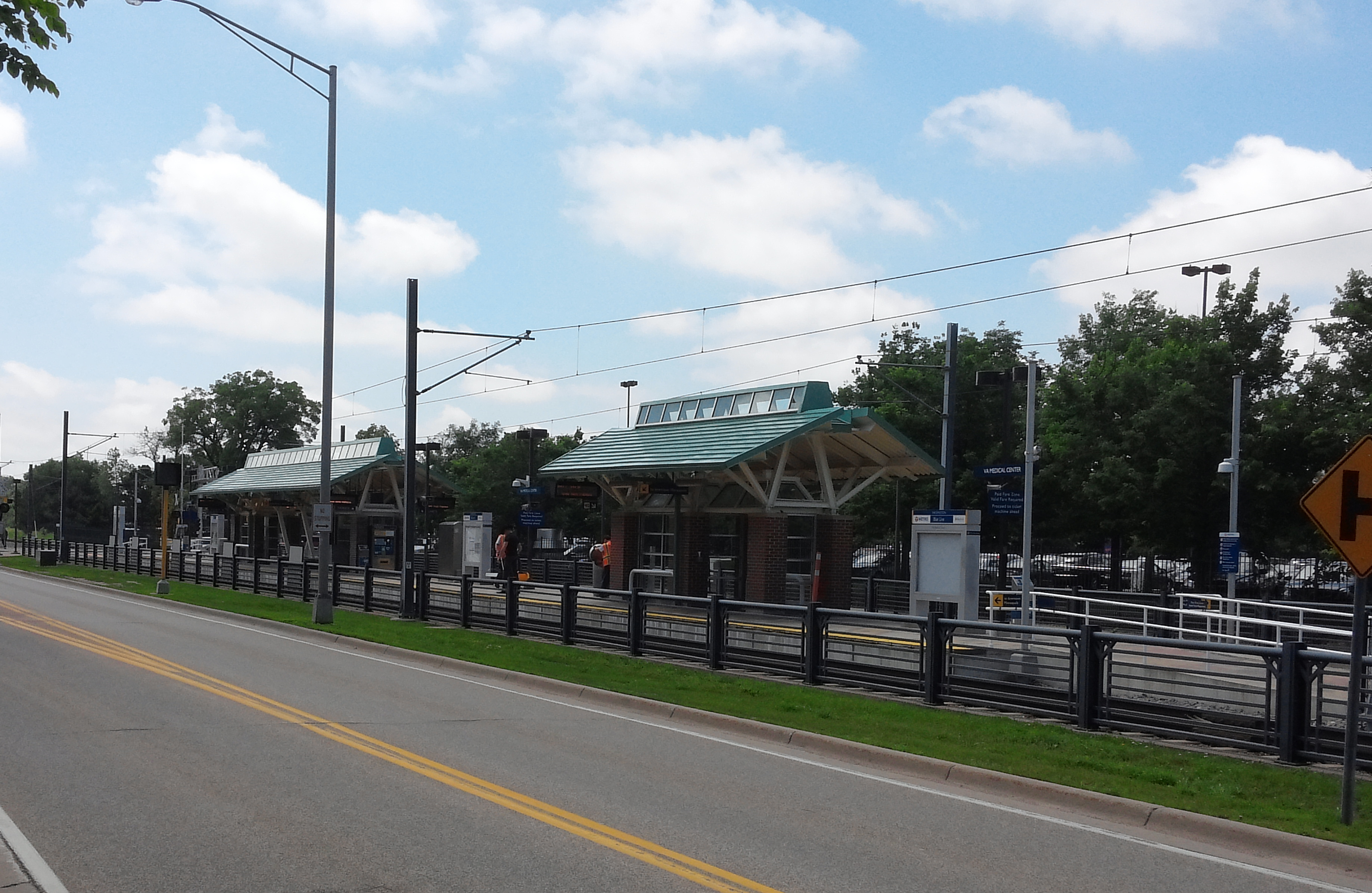
- VA Medical Center station in 2014

General information
- Location: 5504 Minnehaha Avenue; Fort Snelling, Minnesota
- Coordinates: 44°54′10″N 93°12′08″W
- Owner: Metro Transit
- Platforms: 1 island platform
- Tracks: 2
- Connections: Metro Transit: 22, 440, 515

Construction
- Structure type: At-grade
- Accessible: Yes

History
- Opened: June 26, 2004

Passengers
- 2025: 450 daily ▼4.3%
- Rank: 31 out of 37

Services
Preceding station	Metro	Following station
50th Street/Minnehaha Park toward Target Field	Blue Line	Fort Snelling toward Mall of America
Location

VA Medical Center station is a light rail station on the Blue Line on Fort Snelling in the Twin Cities region of Minnesota.

This station is on the northwest corner of the intersection of Minnehaha Avenue with the entrance to the Minneapolis VAHCS Medical Center. A center-platform station, it entered service when the Blue Line opened on June 26, 2004.

North of the station, between it and the 50th Street/Minnehaha Park station, the Blue Line leaves Minnesota State Highway 55 and travels down the center of Minnehaha Avenue for two blocks.

== Bus connections ==
From the station, there are direct bus connections to routes 22, 440 and 515.

== Notable places nearby ==
- Minneapolis Veterans Affairs Health Care System
- Minnehaha and Morris Park neighborhoods
