= St. Cloud VA Health Care System =

- United States Department of Veterans Affairs
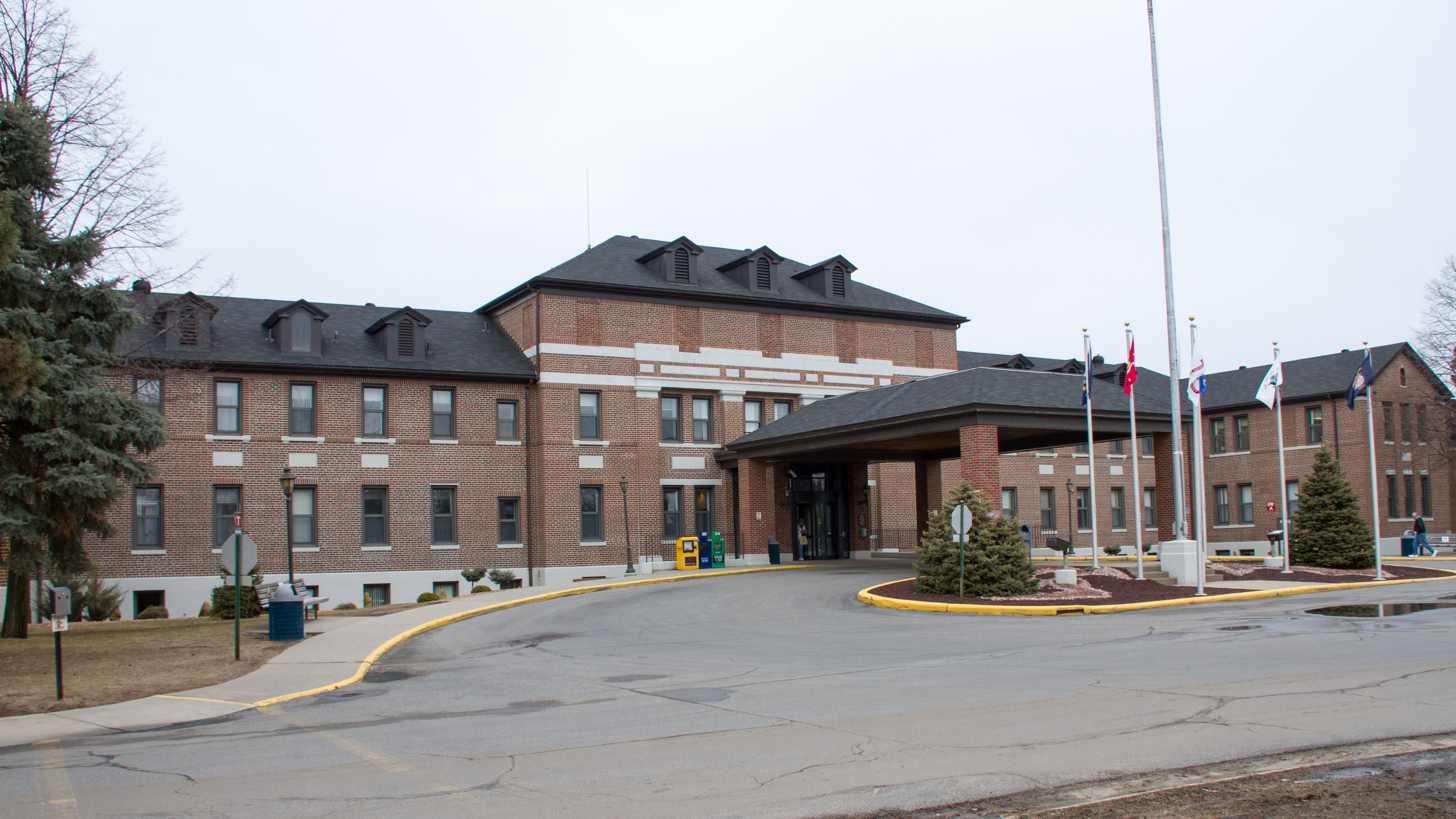
- Main entrance, Building 1

Geography
- Location: 4801 Veterans Drive, St. Cloud, Minnesota, United States
- Coordinates: 45°34′28″N 94°12′49″W

Organization
- Type: General

History
- Opened: 1923

Links
- Website: https://www.stcloud.va.gov/
- Lists: Hospitals in Minnesota
- St. Cloud Veterans Administration Hospital Historic District
- U.S. National Register of Historic Places
- U.S. Historic district
- Area: 176 acres (71 ha)
- Built: 1923–1950
- Architect: Bureau of Yards and Docks, VA Construction Service
- Architectural style: Colonial Revival and Neoclassical
- NRHP reference No.: 12000524
- Added to NRHP: August 21, 2012

The St. Cloud VA Health Care System is a medical facility of the United States Department of Veterans Affairs (VA) in St. Cloud, Minnesota. It was established in 1923.

In 2012 the complex was listed as the St. Cloud Veterans Administration Hospital Historic District on the National Register of Historic Places for its state-level significance in the themes of architecture, health/medicine, and politics/government. It was nominated for the local political efforts towards its establishment, its impact on health care for Minnesota veterans, and its Colonial and Classical Revival architecture. The historic district contains 34 contributing properties built 1923–1950.

== See also ==
- List of Veterans Affairs medical facilities
- List of hospitals in Minnesota
- National Register of Historic Places listings in Stearns County, Minnesota
- Minneapolis VA Health Care System
