= Minnesota Transportation Museum =

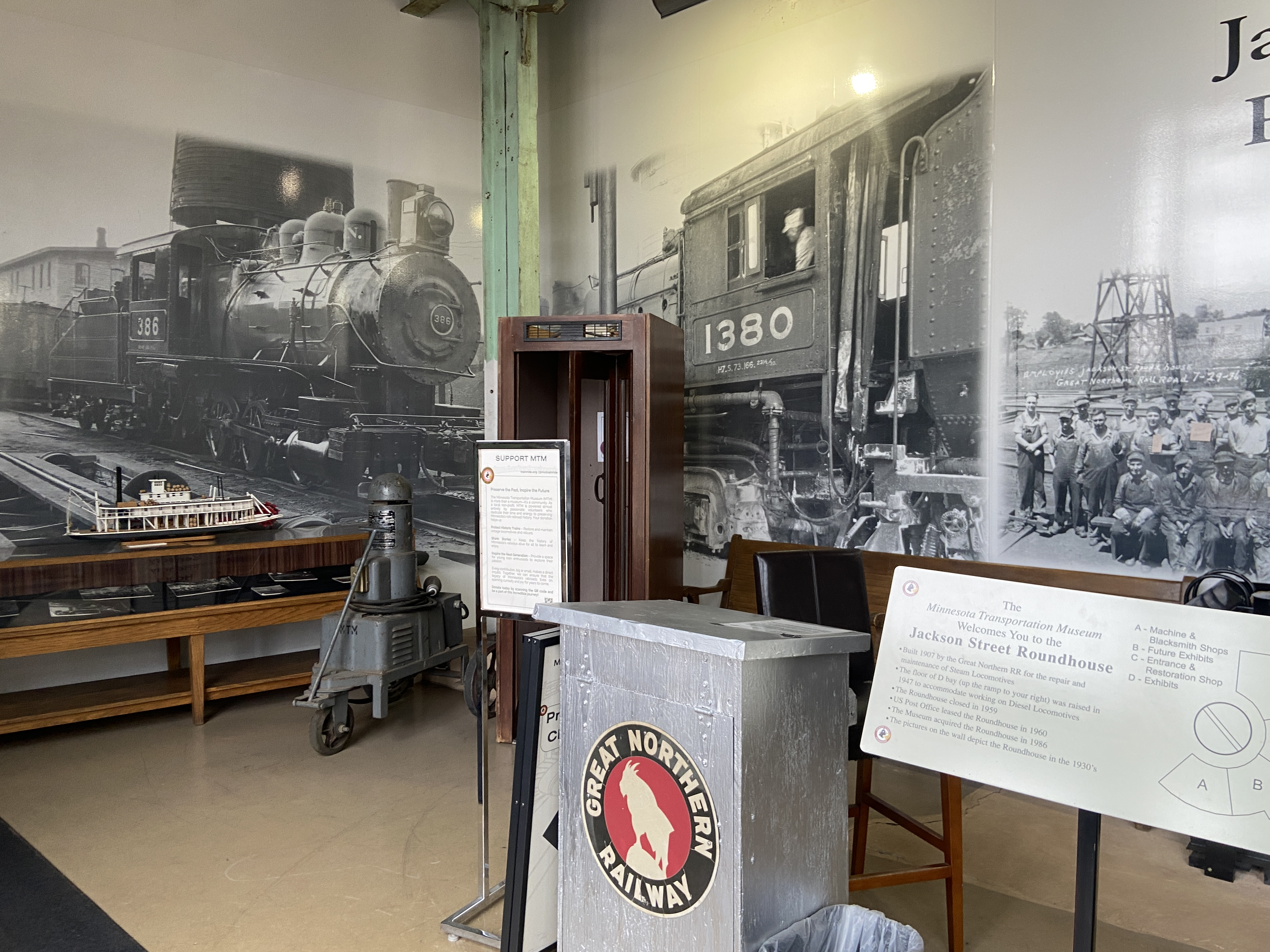
- Displays in the Jackson Street Roundhouse
- Established: 1962
- Location: Saint Paul, Minnesota
- Coordinates: 44°57′45″N 93°5′46″W
- Type: Transportation museum
- Website: http://www.transportationmuseum.org/

The Minnesota Transportation Museum (MTM, reporting mark MNTX) is a transportation museum in Saint Paul, Minnesota, United States.

MTM operates several heritage transportation sites in Minnesota and one in Wisconsin. The museum is actively involved in preserving local railroad, bus, and streetcar history.

MTM was formed in 1962 to save a streetcar that had been built and operated by Twin City Rapid Transit (TCRT) in Minneapolis–St. Paul. Many of the museum's early members were formerly part of the Minnesota Railfans Association, which had organized railfan trips from the 1940s to the 1960s.

In 2004–2005, the organization's streetcar operations became the Minnesota Streetcar Museum, with the steamboat Minnehaha, originally built by TCRT in a style similar to its streetcars, becoming a major attraction of the Museum of Lake Minnetonka.

== Minnehaha Depot ==
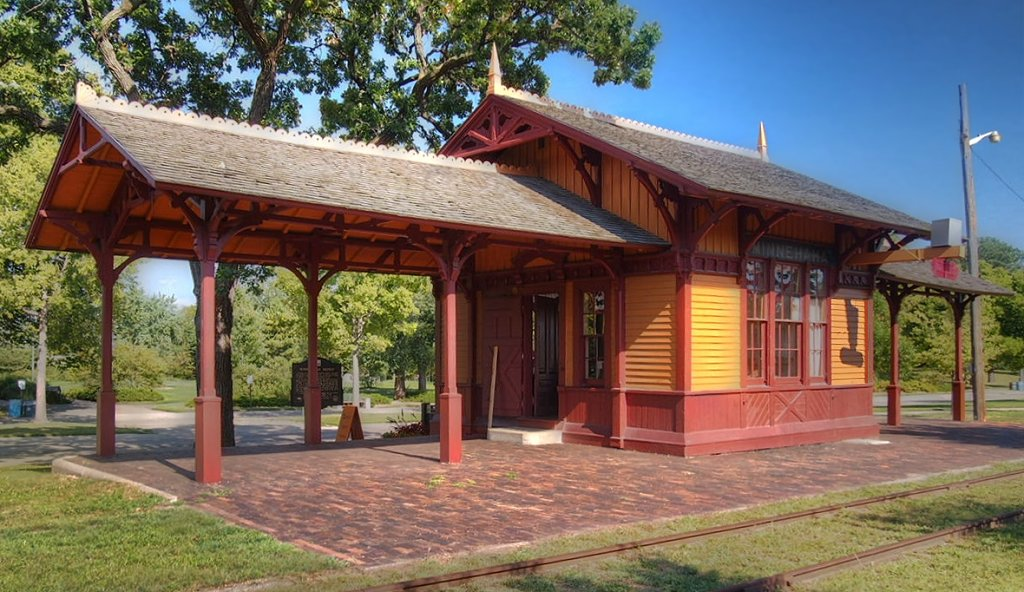
The Minnehaha Depot in Minnehaha Park

After the first streetcar, TCRT No. 1300, was successfully restored, other projects were examined in the time before the streetcar could be put on its own set of rails.

The Minnehaha Depot was a former Milwaukee Road depot at Minnehaha Falls. The station, built in 1875, was nicknamed "The Princess" because of its delicate architecture. The depot is a contributing property to the Minnehaha Historic District. Trains running on special routes have sometimes stopped at the station, and it was eventually integrated into the area streetcar system.

The depot is owned by the Minnesota Historical Society and operated by the Minnesota Transportation Museum. In 1967, the depot became the first building to be restored by the museum and it was outfitted with exhibits. In 2004, the METRO Blue Line's Minnehaha Park station opened across the road from the old depot.

== Classic buses ==
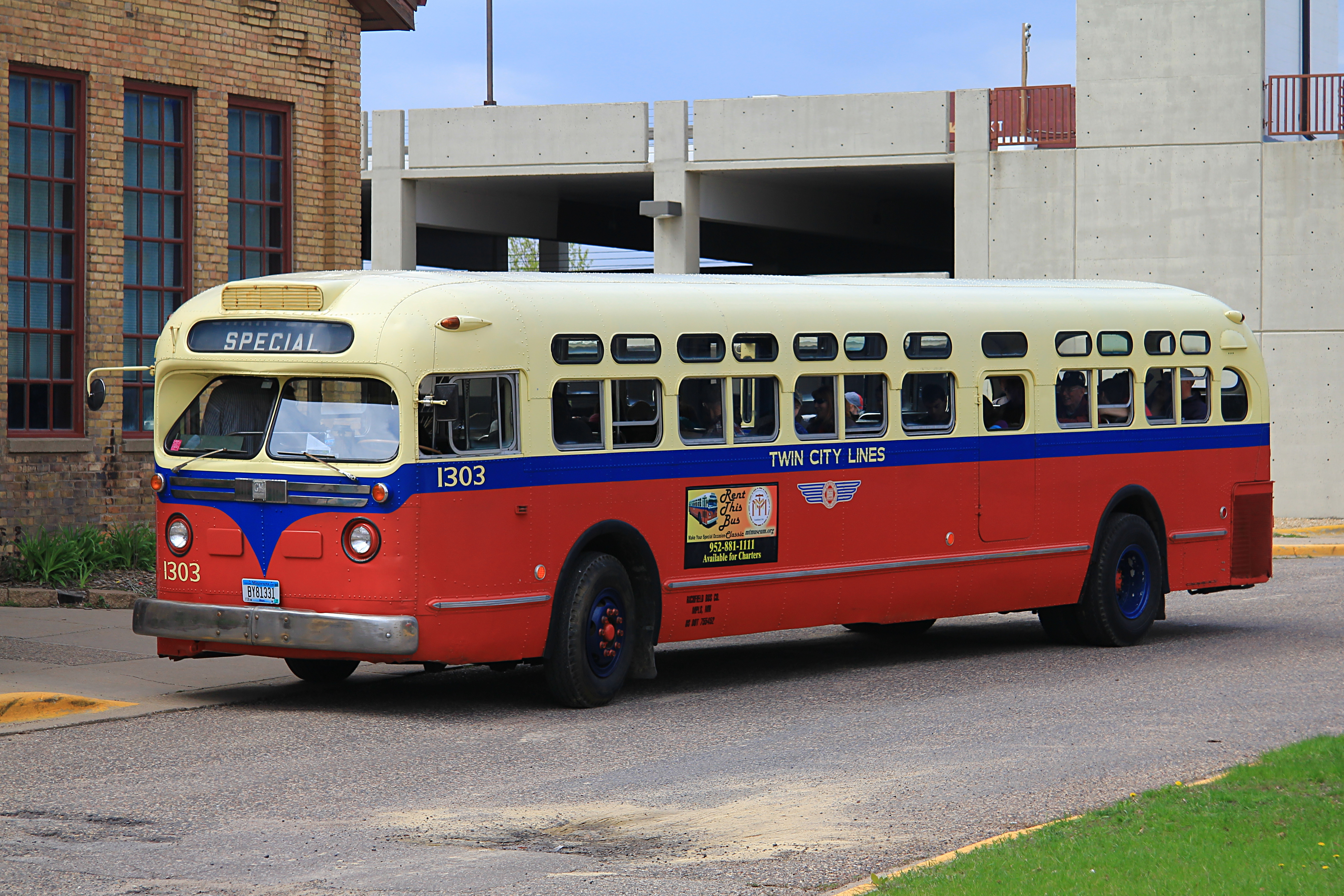
Twin City Lines bus 1303

Up until 2019, several buses from the 1940s and 1950s were also operated by the museum. Most equipment in the bus collection were built by the GMC division of General Motors, and represented the vehicles that replaced the streetcars in the Twin Cities in the 1950s. The conversion from a streetcar to bus system required two years. The last trolley run was on Hennepin Avenue on June 18, 1954.

The collection consisted of buses that once operated in and across Minnesota. The oldest is a 1942 Mack (occasionally used in conjunction with the Commemorative Air Force) which transported war workers to the B-24 final assembly point at what is now St Paul's Holman Field, and a block of 1953/54 GMC transit units, two of which are painted in original Twin Cities Lines colors. The buses were used in regular charter service, and once formed a very visible part of the museum's collection, often used in wedding and corporate charters, and on the museum's city tours.

This part of the collection was sponsored by Richfield Bus Company, who had provided maintenance and licensing to operate them.

As the museum acquired much of its bus collection from Metro Transit, the bus company sometimes requested the use of the old buses for special events.

In 2019, the entire bus collection was donated to a private party. The museum currently has no plans on acquiring new buses to replace their former collection.

== Osceola and St. Croix Valley Railway ==
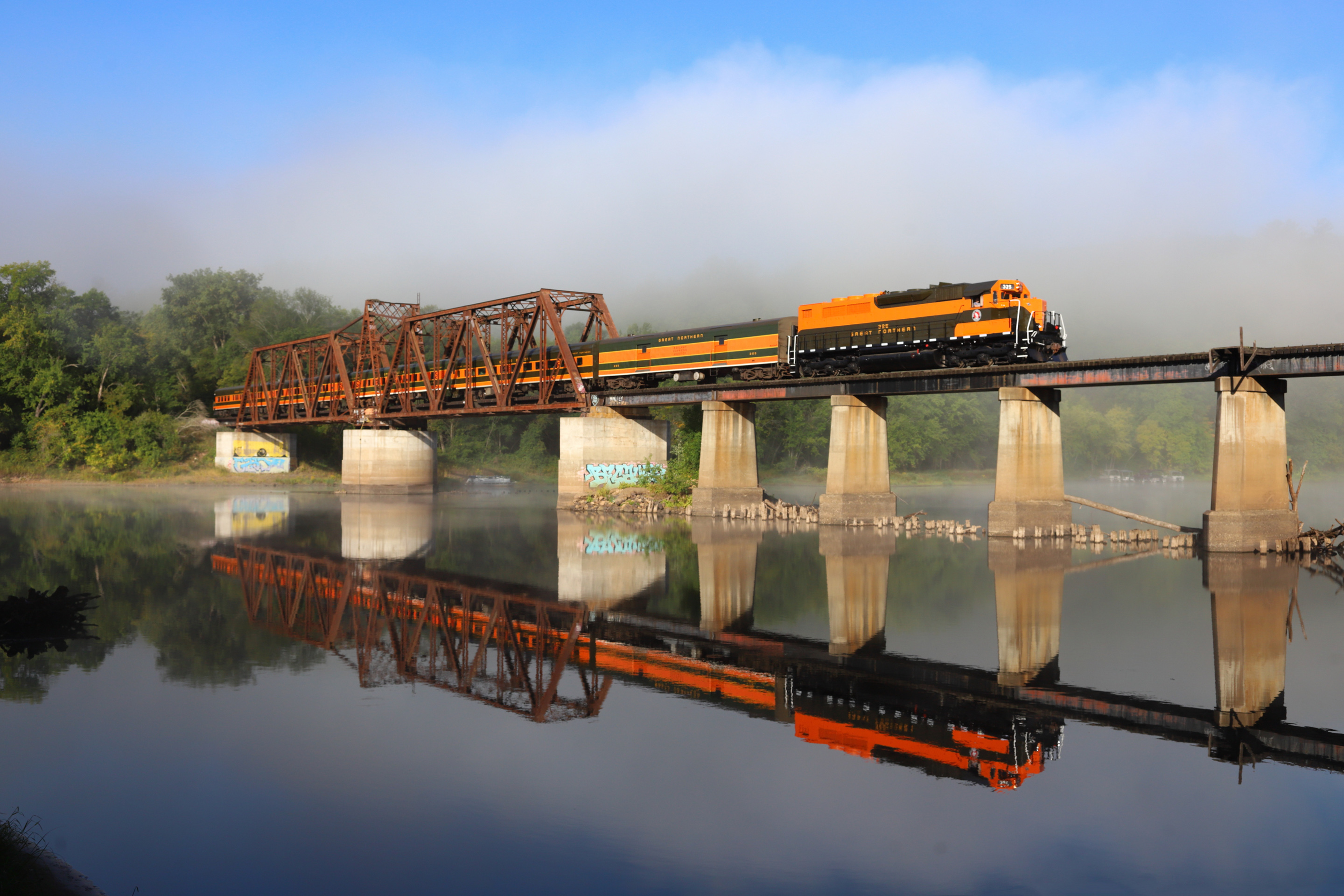
Five-car train going over the St. Croix River

MTM, in conjunction with the Historical Society of Osceola, Wisconsin, operates a heritage railroad called the Osceola and St. Croix Valley Railway. Excursion trains are operated on trackage formerly owned by Wisconsin Central Ltd., now part of Canadian National Railway.

Excursion trains operate from the historic Osceola Depot, north to Dresser, Wisconsin, and southbound to and through the scenic St. Croix River Valley. Regular schedules begin on the first weekend in May, continuing through the last week of October. Special Event trains operate through the season, including Wine Tasting, the Pumpkin Train (Halloween) and Fall Leaf Viewing trains through the River Valley.

At the Osceola service area, several locomotives and pieces of rolling stock are on display. All equipment has been reconditioned to standard operating condition, including classic 1920s open-window coaches, Great Northern express coaches and a refreshment car (Baggage car 265). Locomotives currently in running condition are classic diesel-electric.

In past years the classic steam engine, Northern Pacific No. 328 (4-6-0) was used to pull the trains, but has been placed in restoration status due to its age (107 yrs).

The regular service train route runs approximately 50 minutes to/from Dresser, Wisconsin, and 100 minutes to/from Marine on St. Croix, Minnesota.

The Museum also operates the Dresser Depot at the northeast terminus of the line in Dresser, WI. The Depot has been preserved exactly as if the staff stepped out for a break, down to calendars and railroad notices. It is also the site of Pumpkin Train Park, hosting several thousand visitors during the pre-Halloween weekend.

== Jackson Street Roundhouse ==
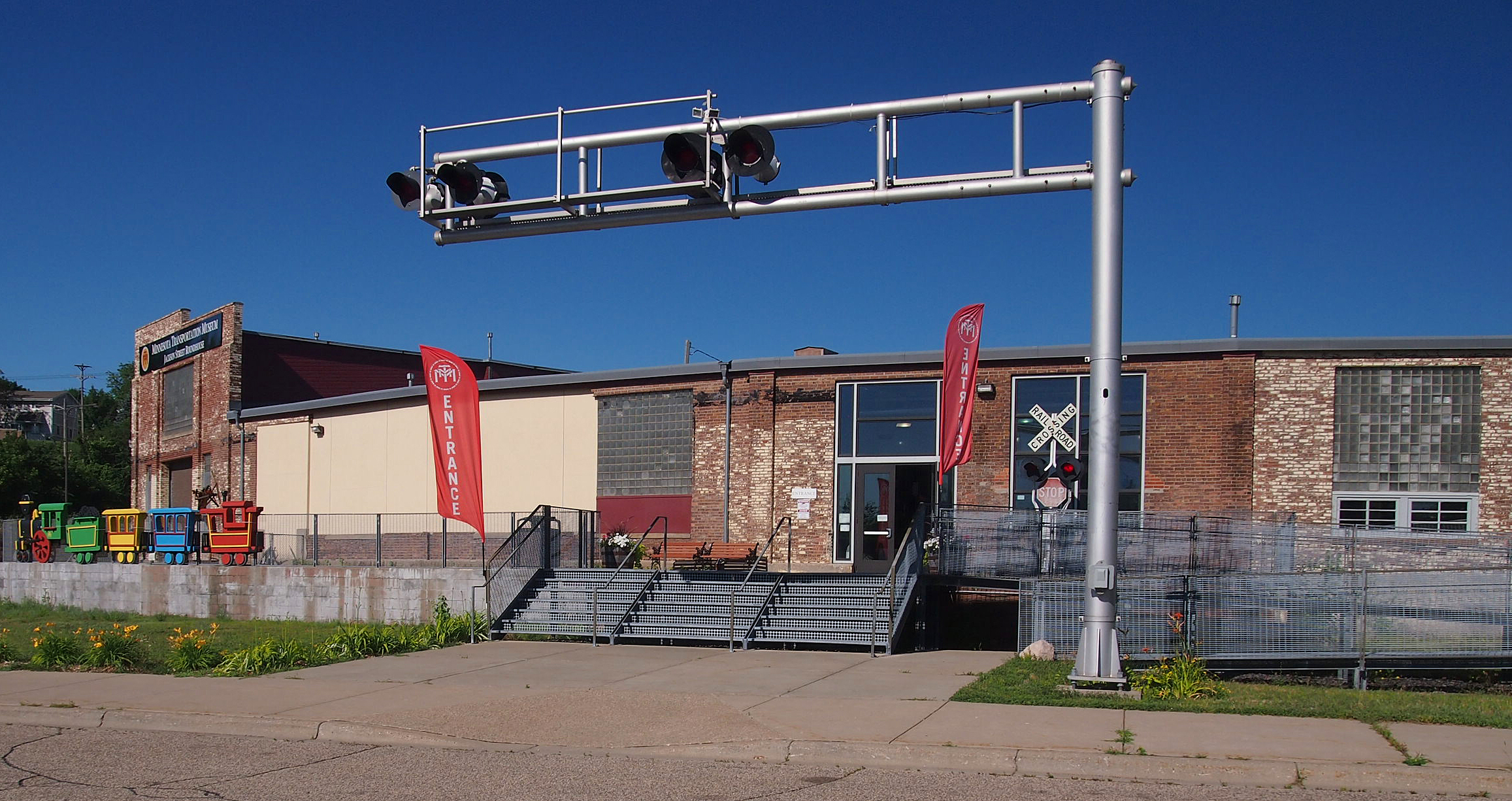
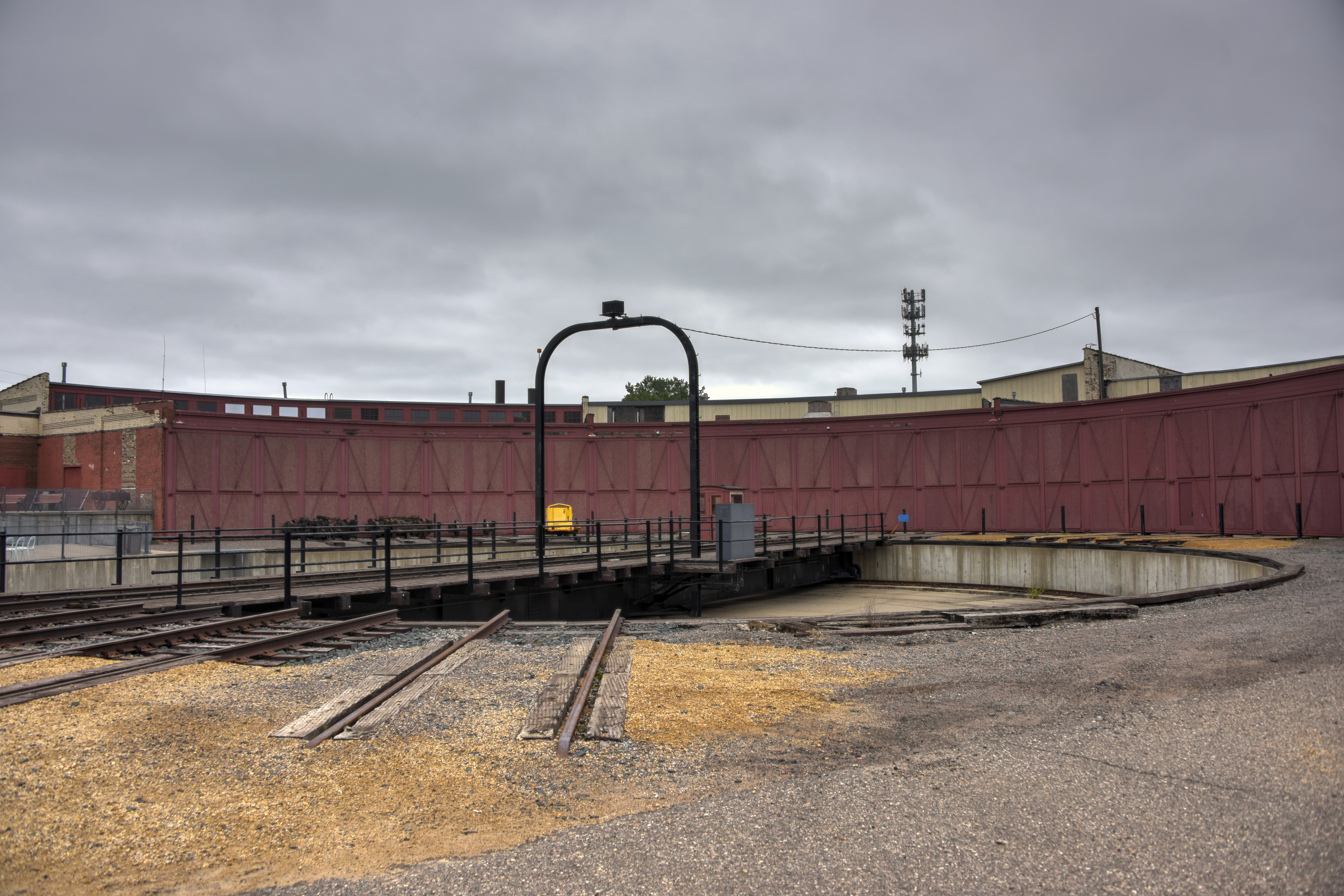
Left: Museum entrance; Right: Turntable

The Jackson Street Roundhouse is MTM headquarters in St. Paul, as well as a fully functional railroad roundhouse, one of the last of its kind in the country. During winter months, the Roundhouse is a functioning work area for Museum rolling stock, often with the volunteer workforce welding, grinding and sending sparks flying.

Open Wednesday & Saturday, year-round, and on Friday during the summer months it is a maintenance & restorations base for the museum's locomotives and rolling stock. It is highly interactive, offering train rides (Saturdays) as well as hands-on exhibits about surface transportation history of Minnesota and the upper Midwest.

The building was erected by the Great Northern Railway in 1907, replacing another, older roundhouse. The site has been used for rail transportation since the first railroad came to Minnesota (1860s). The Roundhouse and surrounding grounds are a near complete display of American industrial history from the 19th century through the mid-20th century.

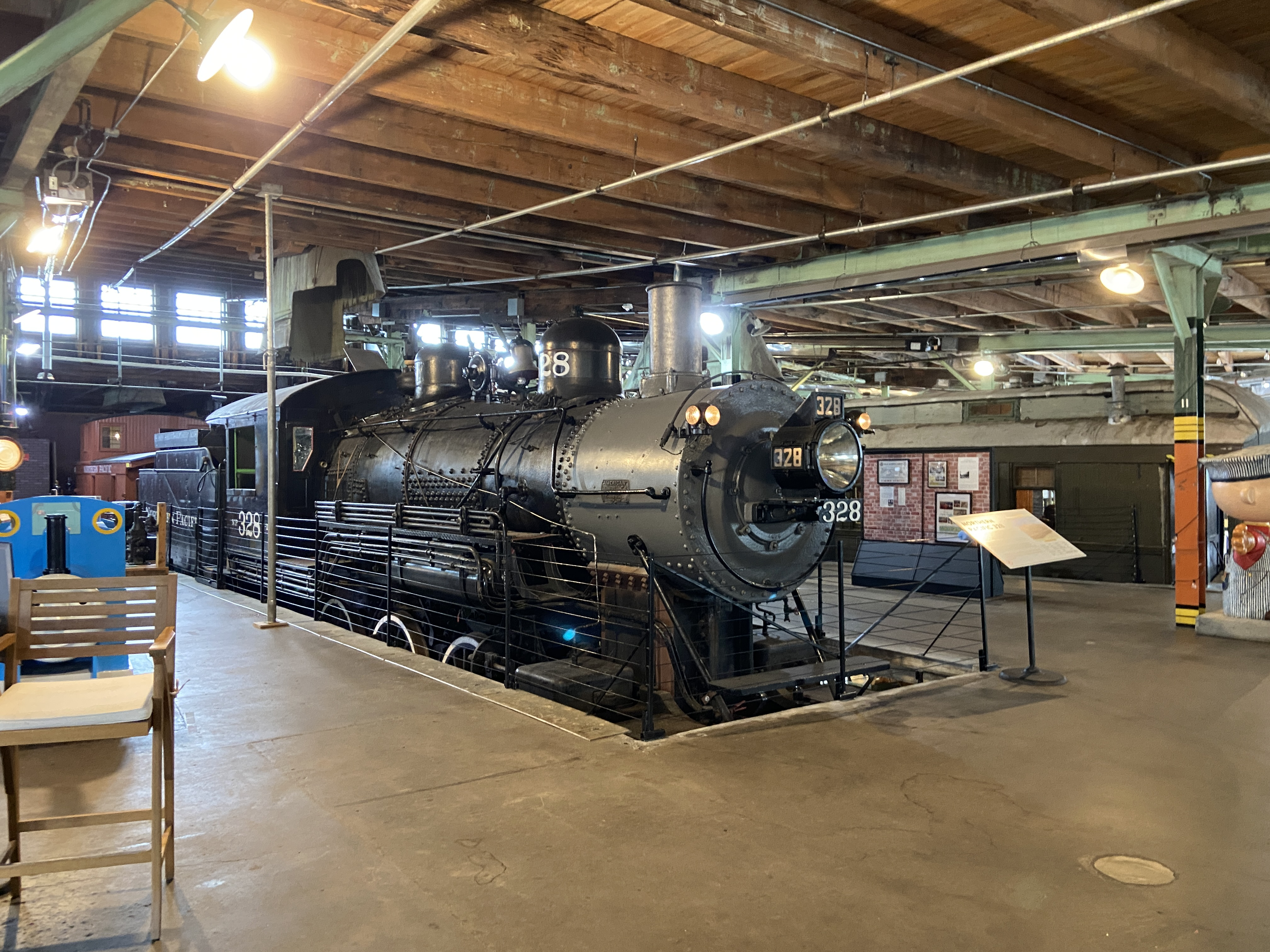
Museum floor

The Roundhouse is the base for equipment as varied as Pullman coaches, Northern Pacific RR mail & baggage cars, an operating 115-foot (35 m) turntable, a 200-ton lifting crane, an F7A Freight engine (under long-term restoration to operating status), a Brill Car (one of the last of its kind), and Rock Island Business Car "Gritty Palace" - donated by the late Art Pew's family in 2022.

The roundhouse is also home to the famous Northern Pacific Railway steam engine No. 2156, known to many Twin Cities Gen X children as Casey Jones's steam engine, from the popular children's program "Lunch With Casey" starring Roger Awsumb as Casey Jones, in the 60's & 70's. No. 2156, having been torn down for restoration for the last decade, is undergoing stabilization to become part of a "Steam Bay" exhibit, demonstrating the inner workings of steam locomotives. It will be displayed next to its sister engine No. 2153, restored cosmetically to original operating configuration.

== Train equipment ==
=== Steam locomotives ===
Locomotive details
Locomotive	Type	Built	Retired	Acquired	Status	Image
Northern Pacific #328	Class S-10 4-6-0	Alco, 1905	1950	Leased 1976	Stored	
Northern Pacific #2153	Class Q-3 4-6-2	Baldwin, 1909	1950s	Donated 2000	Under cosmetic restoration	
Northern Pacific #2156	Class Q-3 4-6-2	Baldwin, 1909	1950s	Leased 1980 - Purchased Later	Partially Disassembled	

=== Diesel locomotives ===
Locomotive details
Locomotive	Type	Built	Retired	Acquired	Location	Status	Image
Andersen Windowalls #3110	EMD SW1	1949	2000	Donated 2001	Jackson Street Roundhouse	Operational	
Burlington Northern #6234 (Colorado & Southern #839)	EMD SD9	1959	2003	Donated 2003	Osceola and St. Croix Valley RY	Operational	
Chicago Burlington & Quincy #9735	EMD PMC	1929	?	Purchased 1984	Jackson Street Roundhouse	Undergoing cosmetic restoration	
Dan Patch #100	GE 57-Ton	1913	1967	Donated 1967	Jackson Street Roundhouse	Display	
General Mills #7176	GE 35-Ton	1962	2018	Donated 2018	Jackson Street Roundhouse	Operational	
Great Northern #325	EMD SDP40	1966	2008	Donated 2009	Osceola and St. Croix Valley RY	Operational	
Great Northern #454-A	EMD F7A	1950	1981	2003	Jackson Street Roundhouse	Stored	
Great Northern #558	EMD SD7	1952	1983	Donated 2017	Jackson Street Roundhouse	On Display, awaiting restoration	
Lake Superior Terminal & Transfer #101	EMD NW2	1948	?	?	Jackson Street Roundhouse	Stored	
Northern Pacific (LST&T) #105	EMD SW1200	1957	?	1987	Jackson Street Roundhouse	Operational	
Atchison, Topeka and Santa Fe #2627 (MNTX #454)	EMD CF7	1946	2015	2020	Jackson Street Roundhouse	Stored, as a spare parts provider	
Northern States Power NSP-5	GE 45-Ton	1951	20xx	2023	Jackson Street Roundhouse	Under restoration	
Soo Line #559 (Rock Island #1223)	EMD GP7	1951	1997	Purchased 1998	Jackson Street Roundhouse	Operational	
US Navy #10106	GE 45-Ton	1942	?	?	Jackson Street Roundhouse	Operational	

=== Passenger cars ===
Railroad Company	Operating Number	Car Name	Car Type	Location	Notes
Chicago & North Western	8676		Baggage-Express	Jackson Street Roundhouse	On display
Chicago, Burlington, & Quincy	4709	Silver Castle	Streamlined Dome Car	Jackson Street Roundhouse	In storage, awaiting restoration
Chicago, Rock Island & Pacific	98	Gritty Palace	Business Car	Jackson Street Roundhouse	On display
Chicago, Rock Island & Pacific	2529		Heavyweight Commuter Coach	Jackson Street Roundhouse	On display
Chicago, Rock Island & Pacific	2604		Heavyweight Commuter Coach	Osceola and St. Croix Valley RY	Operational
Chicago, Rock Island & Pacific	2608		Heavyweight Commuter Coach	Osceola and St. Croix Valley RY	Operational
Duluth, South Shore, & Atlantic	101		Baggage-Mail-Express	Jackson Street Roundhouse	On display
Erie Lakawanna	2232		Heavyweight MU Trailer Commuter Coach	Osceola and St. Croix Valley RY	Operational
Great Northern	A-11		Streamlined Lounge/Observation/Business Car	Osceola and St. Croix Valley RY	Operational
Great Northern	A-18		Business Car		Under restoration in Friends of the 261 storage
Great Northern	16		Steam Heat Car	Jackson Street Roundhouse	In storage (Painted Burlington Northern)
Great Northern	265	Mariah	Streamlined Baggage	Osceola and St. Croix Valley RY	Operational
Great Northern	480		Heavyweight Baggage	Jackson Street Roundhouse	On display
Great Northern	X-757	Drover's Coach	Heavyweight Coach	Jackson Street Roundhouse	On display
Great Northern	1084	Twin Ports	Streamlined Parlor-Buffet	Jackson Street Roundhouse	Under restoration
Great Northern	1096		Streamlined Coach	Osceola and St. Croix Valley RY	At Albia, IA Relco Paint Shop for restoration
Great Northern	1097		Streamlined Coach	Osceola and St. Croix Valley RY	Operational (used as dining car)
Great Northern	1146		Streamlined Diner	Jackson Street Roundhouse	Under restoration
Great Northern	1213		Streamlined Coach	Osceola and St. Croix Valley RY	Operational
Great Northern	1215	City Of Osceola	Streamlined Coach	Osceola and St. Croix Valley RY	Operational
Great Northern	1224		Streamlined Coach	Jackson Street Roundhouse	In storage, awaiting restoration
Milwaukee Road	502		Streamlined Coach	Jackson Street Roundhouse	On display
Minneapolis, Northfield & Southern	2352	Gopher	Heavyweight Business Car	Jackson Street Roundhouse	On display
Northern Pacific	598		Streamlined Coach	Jackson Street Roundhouse	In storage, awaiting restoration
Northern Pacific	1102		Heavyweight Triple Combination	Osceola and St. Croix Valley RY	In Service
Northern Pacific	1370		Heavyweight Coach	Jackson Street Roundhouse	In storage
Soo Line	1472		Heavyweight Diner	Jackson Street Roundhouse	In storage

=== Cabooses ===
- Burlington Northern #11214
- Chicago, Burlington & Quincy #13500
- Great Northern #X71
- Milwaukee Road #992040
- Northern Pacific #1264
- Northern Pacific #1631
- Soo Line #31

=== Service & miscellaneous equipment ===
- Great Northern #X1735 Derrick Wrecking Crane
- Northern Pacific #30 Russel Snow Plow
