= 50th Street/Minnehaha Park station =

Light rail station in Minneapolis, Minnesota

50th Street/Minnehaha Park
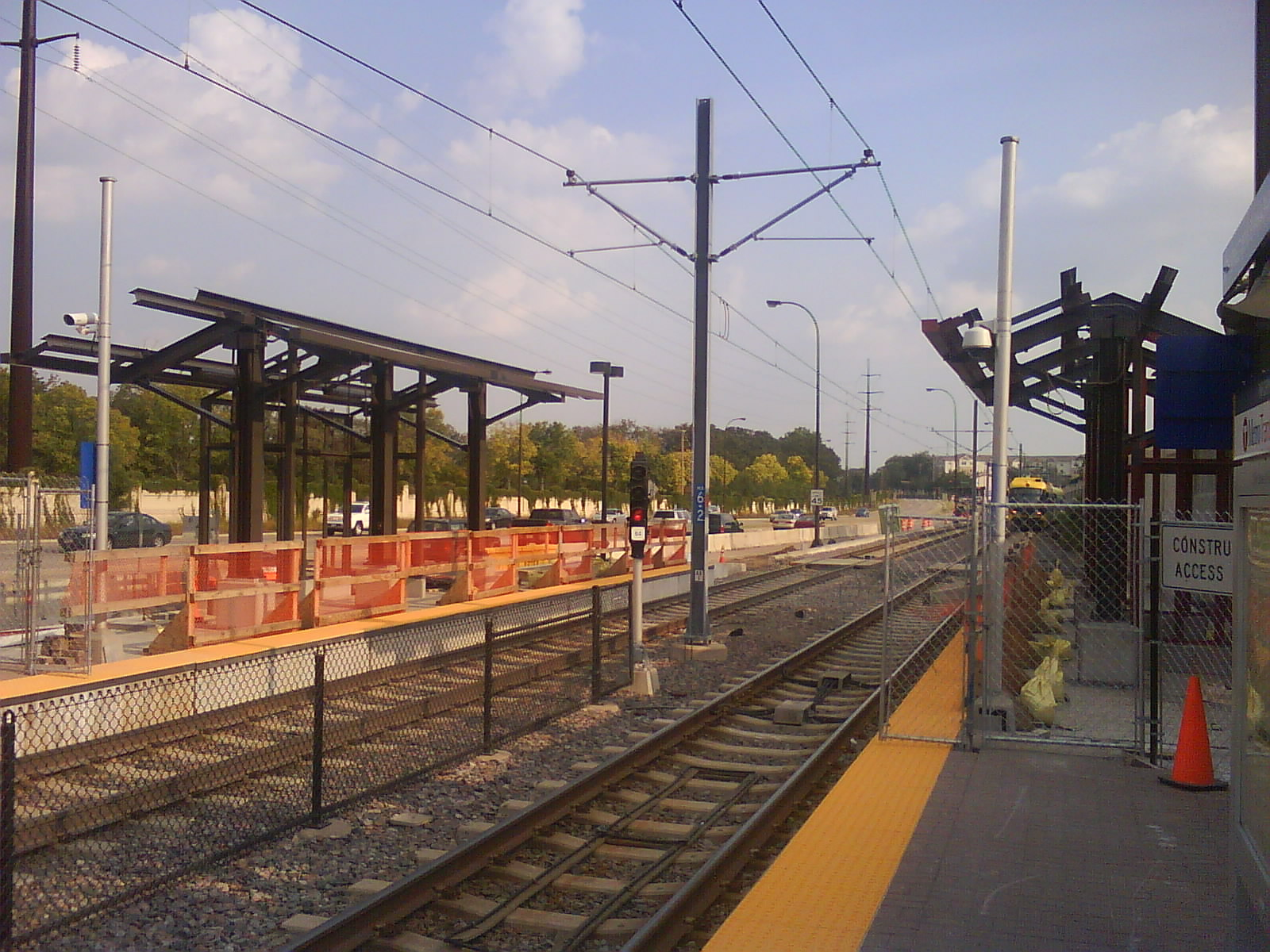
- 50th Street station, undergoing platform extension

General information
- Location: 5010 Minnehaha Avenue; Minneapolis, Minnesota
- Coordinates: 44°54′44″N 93°12′36″W
- Owner: Metro Transit
- Platforms: 2 side platforms
- Tracks: 2

Construction
- Structure type: At-grade
- Accessible: Yes

History
- Opened: June 26, 2004

Passengers
- 2025: 300 daily ▲0.7%
- Rank: 34 out of 37

Services
| Preceding station | Metro | Following station |
|---|---|---|
| 46th Street toward Target Field | Blue Line | VA Medical Center toward Mall of America |
Location

50th Street/Minnehaha Park is a light rail station on the Blue Line in Minneapolis, Minnesota, United States.

This station is located on the southwest corner on the intersection of 50th Street with Minnesota State Highway 55 (Hiawatha Avenue), in the Minnehaha neighborhood. This is a side-platform station. Service began at this station when the Blue Line opened on June 26, 2004.

Early on in the design process, there had been some consideration to use a small existing rail station on the other side of the highway for this stop. The Minnehaha Depot, also known as the "Princess Depot," had been built in 1875 and was used for a variety of purposes over the years. The Milwaukee Road used it for the majority of the time until it closed in 1963, and it was part of the Twin City Rapid Transit streetcar system for many years.

Just north of this station is a short tunnel under Minnehaha Parkway.

== Notable places nearby ==
- Grand Rounds Scenic Byway
- Minneapolis neighborhoods:
  - Hiawatha
  - Minnehaha
- Minnehaha Falls Regional Park
- Minnesota Veterans Home
