= GE 57-ton gas–electric boxcab =

Railroad locomotive

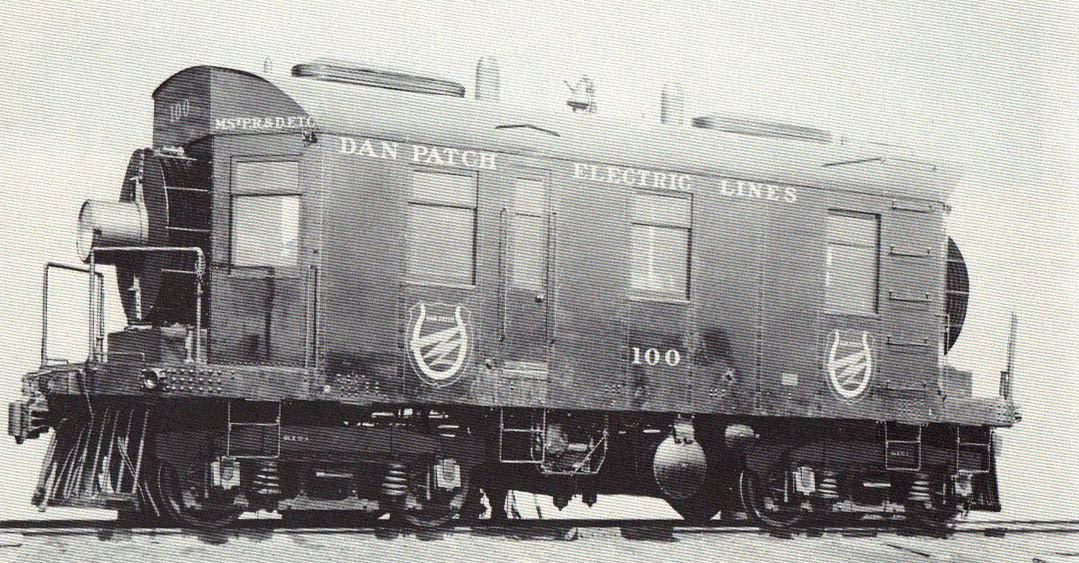
Type and origin
- Power type: Gas–Electric
- Builder: General Electric
- Serial number: 3763
- Build date: 1913
- Total produced: 1
- Rebuilder: Minneapolis, Anoka & Cuyuna Range Railroad
- Number rebuilt: 1
Specifications
- Configuration
  - AAR: B-B
  - UIC: Bo'Bo'
- Gauge: 4 ft 8 1/2 in (1,435 mm) standard gauge
- Length: 36 ft 4 in (11.07 m)
- Width: 10 ft 5.775 in (3.195 m)
- Height: 14 ft 6 3/4 in (4.439 m)
- Loco weight: 57 short tons (52 t; 51 long tons)
- Fuel type: Gasoline
- Prime mover: 2xGM-16C4
- Engine type: V-8
- Traction motors: 4 GE 205D
Performance figures
- Maximum speed: 51 mph (82 km/h)
- Tractive effort: 30,000 lbf (133.45 kN)
Career
- Operators: Dan Patch Electric Lines, Central Warehouse Company, Minneapolis, Anoka and Cuyuna Range Railroad, Great Northern Railway
- Retired: 1967
- Preserved: 1
- Current owner: Minnesota Transportation Museum
- Disposition: Preserved

Before diesel engines had been developed for locomotive power in the 1920s and 1930s, many companies chose to use the gasoline engine for rail motive power. The first GE Locomotive was a series of four-axle (B-B) boxcab gasoline–electric machines closely related to the "doodlebugs", self-propelled passenger cars built in the early Twentieth Century.

One of their first major customers was the Minneapolis, St. Paul, Rochester & Dubuque Electric Traction Company, better known as the Dan Patch Electric Lines after the owner's prize horse of the same name. Founded on the principle of not using steam power if they could avoid it, they asked GE to make them a series of locomotives with internal combustion–electric drive, rather than the mechanical drive systems that were proving unsatisfactory for rail propulsion. GE complied, and created a number of locomotives originally claimed to be the first engines using an engine to drive a generator for traction motors. However, historians later determined that a narrow-gauge diesel–electric locomotive had been built in 1912.

Matching the power of the prime mover with the traction motors was a complicated task for operators of early gasoline–electric systems, which if mismanaged could result in system damage. General Electric's early experiments with gasoline–electric drive led them to develop control systems to simplify the task and increase efficiency in subsequent years, leading to the more widespread adoption of gasoline and Diesel powered electric drive systems in the 1920s.

== As-built specifications for No. 100 ==
- Serial Number: 3763
- Build Date: June 1913
- Engines (2): GM-16C4 V-8
- Motors (4): GE 205 D
- Dimensions:
  - Weight: 57 short tons (52 t; 51 long tons)
  - Overall length: 36 ft 4 in (11.07 m)
  - Cab length: 27 ft 0 in (8.23 m)
  - Width: 10 ft 5.875 in (3.20 m)
  - Height: 14 ft 6.75 in (4.44 m)
- Starting tractive effort: 30,000 lbf (130,000 N)
- Rated top speed: 38 mph (61 km/h)
  - Actual top speed: 51 mph (82 km/h) light, 45 mph (72 km/h) with a 5-car train

== Survivors ==
No. 100 still survives. After the Dan Patch Line went into bankruptcy, its sisters went to a California traction company while 100 was sold first to the Central Warehouse Company of Saint Paul, Minnesota, in 1917, who converted it to a simple electric locomotive. It was then sold to the Minneapolis, Anoka and Cuyuna Range Railroad (MA&CR) in 1922 for $12,000. The MA&CR owned the locomotive until that railroad was bought by the Great Northern Railway in 1966. In the meantime, the MA&CR had removed its trolley wire and converted 100 to a diesel–electric system, using a Waukesha diesel engine.

In 1967, the Great Northern donated Dan Patch #100 to the Minnesota Transportation Museum of St. Paul, MN. As of 2025, it is on display at their Jackson Street Roundhouse in St. Paul.
