= Northern Pacific class S-10 =

Historic type of railroad steam engine

NP S-10 Class
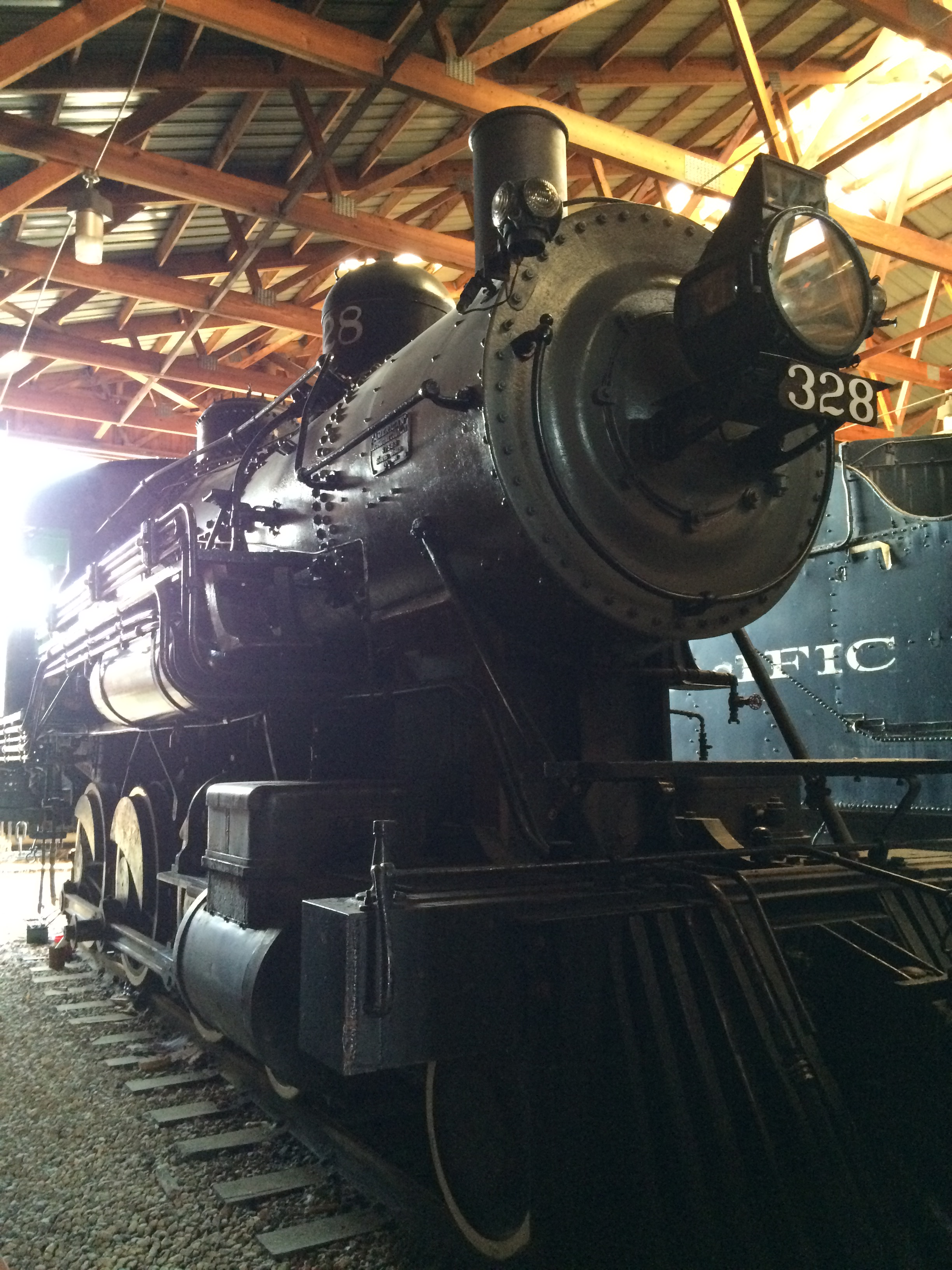
- NP 328 in the Jackson Street Roundhouse, November 2015
Type and origin
- Power type: Steam
- Builder: Alco (Rogers)
- Build date: 1905-1907
- Total produced: 20
Specifications
- Configuration
  - Whyte: 4-6-0
  - UIC: 2'C
- Gauge: 4 ft 8 1/2 in (1,435 mm)
- Leading dia.: 30 in (762 mm)
- Driver dia.: 57 in (1,448 mm)
- Wheelbase: 21 ft 1 in (6.426 m)
- Length: 58 ft 6 in (17.831 m)
- Height: 14 ft 10 1/4 in (4.528 m)
- Adhesive weight: 115,000 lb (52 t)
- Loco weight: 153,000 lb (69 t)
- Tender weight: 104,000 lb (47 t)
- Fuel type: Coal
- Water cap.: 5,500 US gal (21,000 L; 4,600 imp gal)
- Firebox
  - Grate area: 38.5 square feet (3.58 m^{2})
- Boiler pressure: 190 lbf/in^{2} (1.31 MPa)
- Heating surface
  - Tubes and flues: 1,865 square feet (173.3 m^{2})
  - Total surface: 2,010 square feet (187 m^{2})
- Cylinders: Two, simple
- Cylinder size: 19 in × 26 in (483 mm × 660 mm)
- Valve gear: Stephenson
- Loco brake: Air
- Train brakes: Air
Performance figures
- Tractive effort: 26,600 lbf (118 kN)
Career
- Operators: Northern Pacific Railway
- Class: S-10
- Numbers: 320-329
- Locale: Montana, North Dakota, Minnesota, Wisconsin
- Withdrawn: 1928-1950
- Preserved: 328

The Northern Pacific class S-10 (NP S-10) was a type of steam locomotive in use on American railroads in the early 20th century. The first engines of the type were introduced in 1905, and ten were acquired by the Northern Pacific Railway (NP) in 1907, continuing in service until the 1930s and 1940s. One of the engines, Specifically No. 328, has been preserved.

== Entry into service ==
The Chicago Southern railroad was incorporated in 1904 by John R. Walsh, to build part of a Chicago, Illinois to Terre Haute, Indiana line. Twelve 2-6-0, eight 4-4-0 and twenty 4-6-0 locomotives were ordered from the Rogers works of the American Locomotive Company in Paterson, New Jersey. The first six 4-6-0's were delivered in August 1905. The remaining fourteen were held by the builder because the railroad entered bankruptcy and sat, mostly complete, awaiting a new buyer.

In 1907, the Northern Pacific was short of power and purchased ten of the fourteen 4-6-0 locomotives remaining at the builder's plant for $14,500 each. The NP classified the locomotives as NP S-10 and numbered them 320–329. Because these ten locomotives were completed in February 1907, that was the date on their builder's plates.

The Wisconsin & Michigan Railway purchased two of other unfinished ten-wheelers, and the Chicago, Terre Haute and Southeastern Railway (later the Chicago, Milwaukee, St. Paul and Pacific Railroad as MILW class G6-r) purchased four.

The American Locomotive Company sold the remaining four locomotives to the Pullman Company, the Nevada Northern Railway, and the South Manchuria Railway. The later was a Japanese-controlled railroad in Manchuria, which offered the NP $15,000 each for their ten, but the NP declined.

== Deployment ==
In May 1908, 321 and 322 were assigned to the Dakota Division, 320, 323 and 324 to the Pharaoh Division, and 325–329 to the Minnesota Division. By July 1925, 325 and 326 were reassigned to the Montana Division.

== Retirement ==
First to leave the roster was 329, scrapped at Brainerd, Minnesota in January 1929. More followed in 1930–1933, leaving only 321 and 328. These were kept for the branch lines from White Bear Lake, Minnesota to Stillwater, Minnesota, Wyoming, Minnesota to Taylors Falls, Minnesota, and Rush City, Minnesota to Grantsburg, Wisconsin. The primary reason was that the light 56-pound rail and the bridge, NP's oldest, over the St. Croix River on the Grantsburg branch could not support heavier locomotives. NP 321 was set to scrap at Brainerd in 1946. The Local operating on the Grantsburg Branch, from Rush City, was known as the "Blueberry Special."

NP 328 pulled the last train to Taylors Falls on June 30, 1948.

== Preservation ==
NP 328 was sold to the Minnesota Railfans Association in August 1950, and displayed in a Stillwater, Minnesota city park. In 1976 she was leased by the Minnesota Transportation Museum for restoration, and operated from 1981 until 2001. Today it is exhibited at the Jackson Street Roundhouse.
