= Minneapolis Veterans Affairs Health Care System =

- Veterans Health Administration
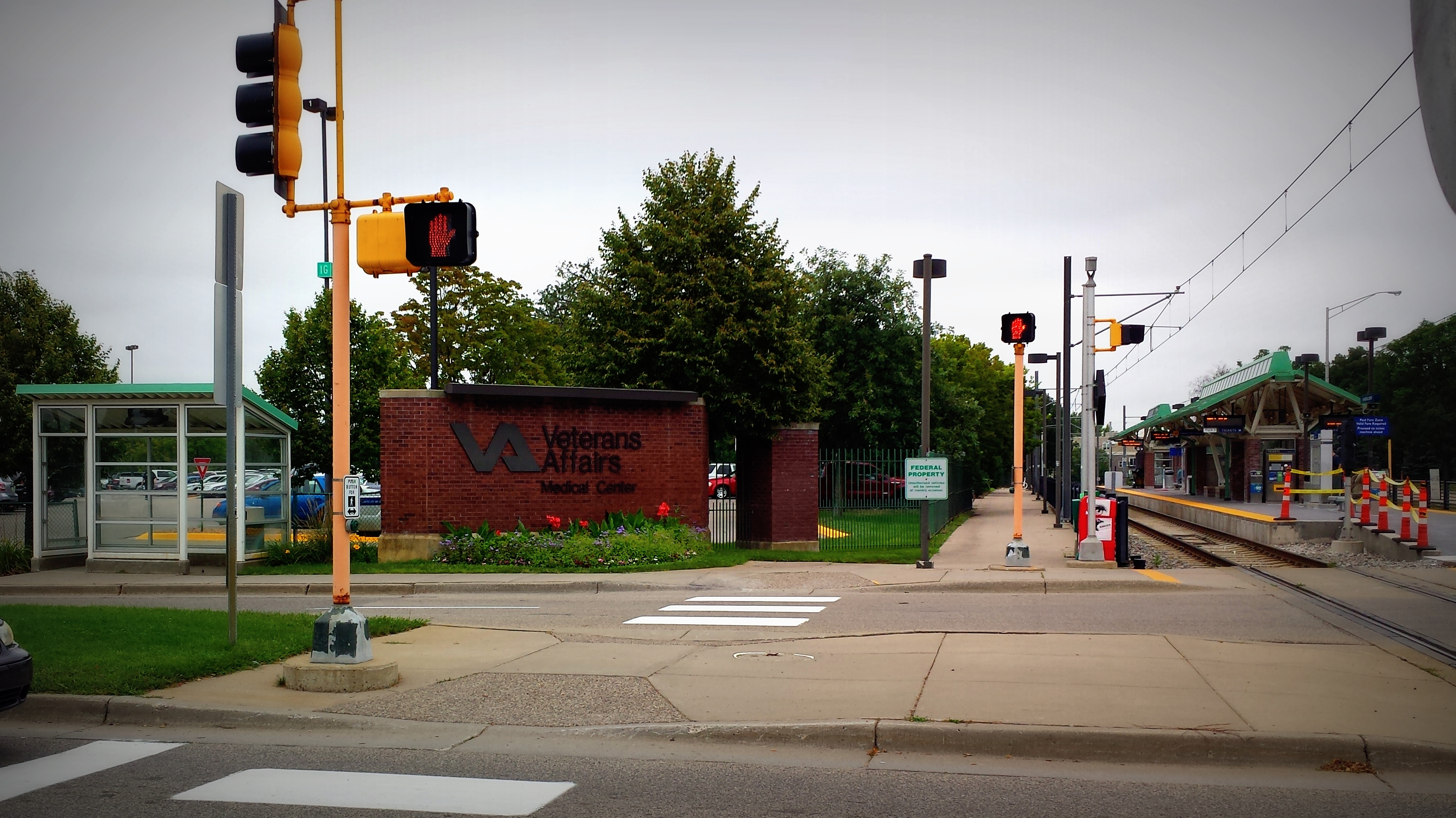
- Minneapolis VAHCS Medical Center main entrance

Geography
- Location: Minneapolis, Minnesota, United States
- Coordinates: 44°54′7″N 93°12′14″W

Services
- Beds: 845

History
- Opened: 1920

Links
- Website: www.minneapolis.va.gov
- Lists: Hospitals in Minnesota

The Minneapolis Veterans Affairs Health Care System (VAHCS) is network of hospital and outpatient clinics based in Minneapolis, Minnesota, United States. It belongs to the VISN23 VA Midwest Health Care Network managed by the Veterans Health Administration of the United States Department of Veterans Affairs. The Minneapolis VAHCS provides healthcare for United States military veterans in areas such as medicine, surgery, psychiatry, physical medicine and rehabilitation, neurology, oncology, dentistry, geriatrics and extended care. As a teaching hospital, it operates comprehensive training programs for multiple treatment specialties. The Minneapolis VAHCS also hosts one of the largest research programs of any VA health care system and maintains research affiliations with the University of Minnesota.

== History ==
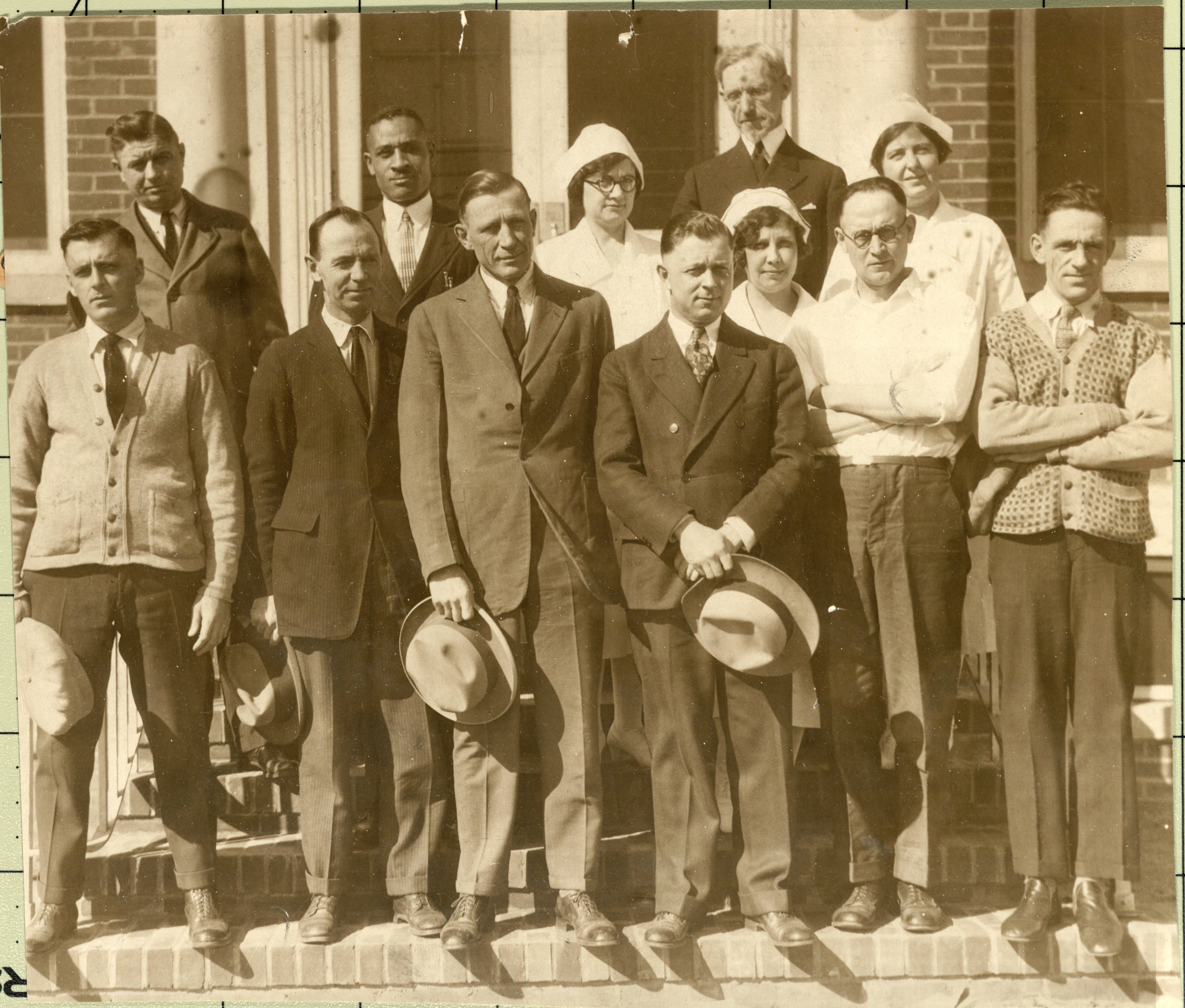
Some of the hospital's first patients (1927)

Following the end of World War I, there was a pressing need for facilities to provide medical care for the influx of recently returning veterans in Minnesota and the surrounding states. In the fall of 1920, representatives from the Federal Government's Public Health Department negotiated a five-year lease of the 350-bed main building of the financially distressed Asbury Hospital located near Elliot Park in downtown Minneapolis. In early 1921, the lease was transferred to the Veterans Bureau and United States Veterans Hospital Number 68 began operations. Its initial focus was on rehabilitation medicine and treating tuberculosis exposure.

In 1925, President Calvin Coolidge transferred 160 acres from the Fort Snelling Military Reservation by executive order to construct a permanent campus for this Veterans Hospital. Construction of the new 557-bed hospital was completed in two years. Veterans began receiving treatment on this site in March 1927. By June of that year, the hospital was near capacity. Expansion on this site continued with 36 new buildings built by the end of World War II. The hospital had expanded its capacity to 1000 beds by 1974, but still faced a severe space shortage.

Construction began in 1983 to replace 90% of the campus buildings and erect the main Medical Center building present today. Space was allocated for 845 beds, but proximity to Minneapolis-St. Paul International Airport meant the building was also restricted to a height of four stories. The Medical Center was completed in 1987 and transfer of patients took place in 1988. The overall project cost was $200 million. The Medical Center was connected to light rail on the Metro Blue Line via the VA Medical Center station in 2004.

== Medical Center ==
The main Medical Center building of the Minneapolis VAHCS is one of the largest occupied structures in the city of Minneapolis with 1.5 million square feet and over 4000 rooms. Building design is oriented around three large interior atria, which delivers natural light to patient care rooms. The majority of services from the Minneapolis VAHCS are delivered in this building. The facility features an emergency department, surgical suites, dental clinics, and multiple inpatient and outpatient clinics across specialty areas. Additional nearby buildings support operations in the Medical Center such as an oncology intervention specialty clinic, research laboratories, training rooms, short-term housing, a Fisher House for family members of veterans receiving treatment, and a Hiway Federal Credit Union.

=== Patient aligned care teams ===
The Minneapolis VAHCS has been a participant in the Veterans Health Administration's rollout of the patient aligned care team (PACT) model of healthcare delivery. Providers across professional areas are organized into small interdisciplinary teams responsible for managing the delivery of each veteran's healthcare. Typically, each team consists of a primary provider (e.g., physician, nurse practitioner), a registered nurse care manager, a licensed practical nurse or the equivalent, and a clerk. When needed, PACTs interface with additional providers assigned to their teams such as clinical pharmacists, social workers, dietitians, physical therapists, and integrated behavioral health specialists. Patients care continues to be managed and monitored by PACT providers when veterans are referred to specialty care and/or inpatient services.

=== Spinal Cord Injury/Disorder (SCI/D) Center ===
The Minneapolis VAHCS is one of four VA medical centers with specialty care capacity for polytrauma injuries. It accepts both active duty military service members and veterans with traumatic brain injury, blindness and amputation for rehabilitation. In 2009, a $20 million Spinal Cord Injury/Disorder (SCI/D) Center was completed as an addition to the main Medical Center. The SCI/D Center provides comprehensive rehabilitation services for spinal cord and other related injuries among to return veterans to increased independent functioning. It includes a 30-bed specialty inpatient unit, outpatient clinics, and a procedure room for specialized testing (e.g., urodynamics).

== Community Based Outpatient Clinics (CBOCs) ==
The Minneapolis VAHCS also provides services to veterans through a network of community based outpatient clinics (CBOCs) in the greater Twin Cities metro area, rural Minnesota, and Western Wisconsin. These include facilities in Albert Lea (MN), Chippewa Falls (WI), Ely (MN), Hayward (WI), Hibbing (MN), Mankato (MN), Maplewood (MN), Ramsey (MN), Rice Lake (WI), Rochester (MN), Shakopee (MN), St. James (MN), and Superior (WI). Each CBOC facility is staffed and equipped to provide common outpatient healthcare services. In addition, the Minneapolis VAHCS delivers telemedicine from providers at the main Medical Center to improve access to specialty care services among veterans in rural locations for whom traveling regularly to the Minneapolis location would be prohibitive. All veterans enrolled in the Minneapolis VAHCS are eligible to use these outpatient clinics.

== Education and research ==
The Minneapolis VAHCS operates as a teaching hospital and medical research facility, and has active affiliations with the University of Minnesota's Medical School and School of Dentistry. The Minneapolis VA research program has 81,000 square feet of dedicated preclinical and clinical research space. The research program includes 140 investigators, conducting 250+ funded studies annually, with over 30 million dollars in overall annual research funding. The Medical Center typically hosts about 1,500 trainees across various healthcare specialties each year. Medical residents in medical, surgical, psychiatric, oral surgery and diagnostic specialties participate in training at the Medical Center. In addition, the Minneapolis VAHCS operates an American Psychological Association-accredited doctoral psychology internship program and supports social work internships. Multiple research laboratories conduct their work at the Minneapolis VAHCS independently and in affiliation with the University of Minnesota. There is a particular research emphasis on the assessment, treatment, and neuroscience correlates of pain and opioid addiction, implementation and outcomes research, prosthetics and adaptive technology, mental illness, and brain injury.

=== Center for Care Delivery and Outcomes Research (CCDOR) ===
Center for Care Delivery and Outcomes Research (CCDOR) was established in 1998 as a VA Center of Innovation for health science research. Principal investigators primarily focus on studies of healthcare implementation to improve chronic disease outcomes among veterans. Particular areas of focus are PTSD treatment, chronic pain management best practice, and opioid use. CCDOR currently includes 28 core investigators, research fellows, and support staff.

=== Rehabilitation & Engineering Center for Optimizing Veteran Engagement & Reintegration (RECOVER) ===
The Minneapolis Rehabilitation & Engineering Center for Optimizing Veteran Engagement & Reintegration (RECOVER) is a VA Rehabilitation Research Development and Translation (RRDT)-funded center focused on Veterans with lower-limb amputations and/or spinal cord injuries and disorders (SCID). RECOVER employs a core team of research engineers, rehabilitation specialists, and clinicians. Originally organized as the Minneapolis Adaptive Design & Engineering (MADE) program, RECOVER program staff work to develop and evaluate rehabilitation equipment and technologies. These include research and development of prosthetic and orthotic devices, wheelchairs, adaptive exercise equipment, eye tracking, and mobile healthcare tools.

=== Geriatric Research, Education and Clinical Center (GRECC) ===
The Geriatric Research, Education and Clinical Center (GRECC) was established in 1978 as a specialty program addressing dementia concerns among aging veterans across the VISN23 VA Midwest Health Care Network. GRECC operates a clinical service to identify and treat a variety of dementia-related conditions. The center also operates multiple ongoing research protocols, including clinical trials, animal models of Alzheimer's disease, brain imaging, driving ability assessments of veterans with dementia, and testing new models of care delivery.

=== Brain Sciences Center ===
In the late 1980s, the American Legion, the American Legion Auxiliary, and the Sons of the American Legion spearheaded fundraising efforts for neuroscience research at the University of Minnesota and the Minneapolis VAHCS. Their eventual donation of over $1 million was matched by the University of Minnesota Medical School for the creation of the American Legion Chair position and Brain Sciences Center. Since that time, the chair and its associated research center has been occupied and directed by Apostolos Georgopoulos, M.D.. The center has conducted a variety of neuroscience research on posttraumatic stress disorder (PTSD), Gulf War syndrome, Alzheimer's disease, schizophrenia, and alcohol use disorder using basic laboratory and cognitive neuroscience methodology. The Center contains dedicated magnetoencephalography (MEG) equipment for neuroscience research. In 2013, the William L. Anderson Chair for PTSD Research was added following a $2 million donation, which is currently occupied by Brian Engdahl, Ph.D.

== See also ==
- List of Minnesota Veterans Affairs medical facilities
- List of hospitals in Minnesota
- St. Cloud VA Health Care System
