= Fort Snelling (unorganized territory), Minnesota =

Unorganized territory in Minnesota, United States

Unorganized Territory of Fort Snelling
- Unorganized territory
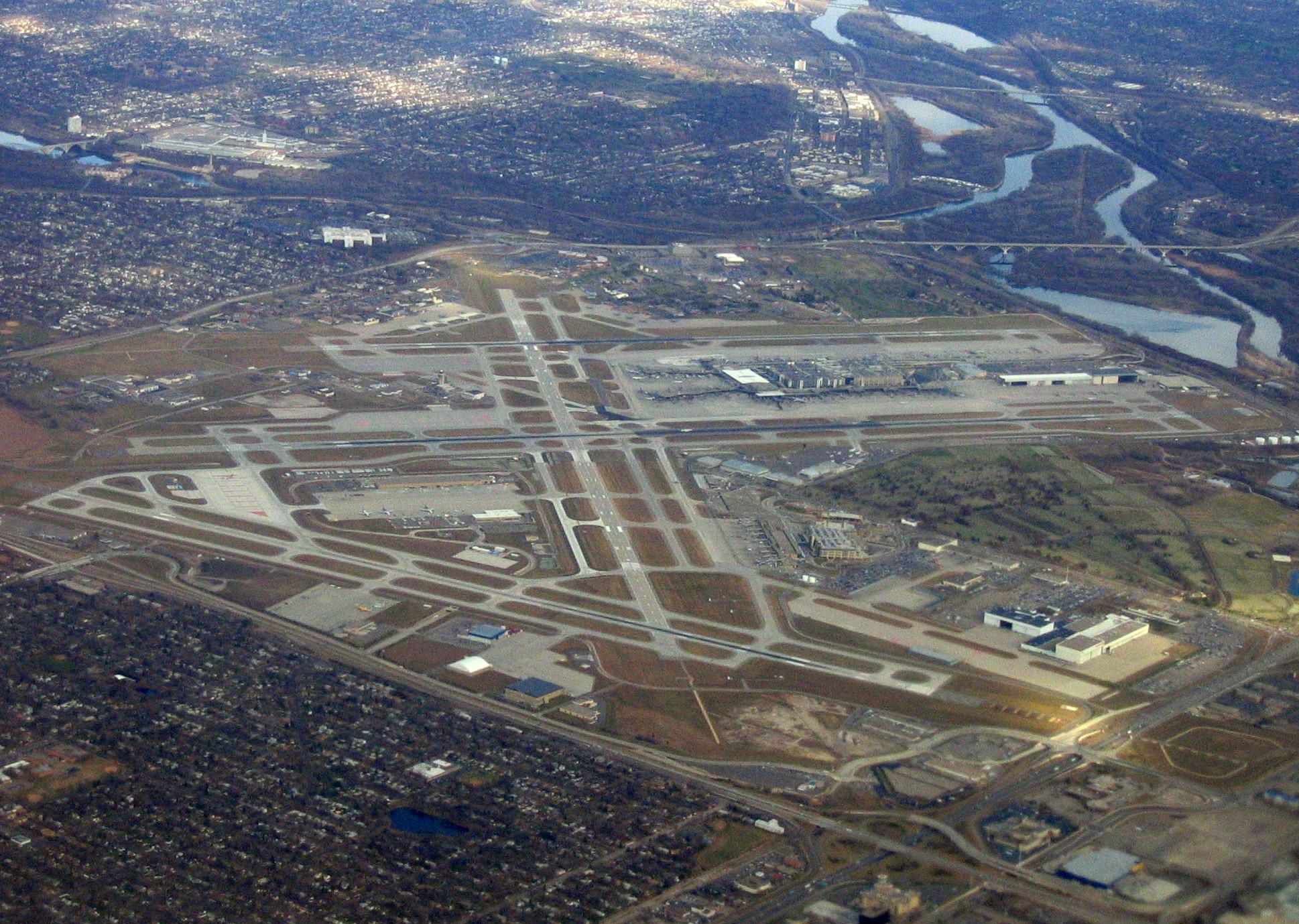
- Aerial photograph of Minneapolis–St. Paul International Airport showing much of the unorganized territory of Fort Snelling. The historic fort is by the confluence of the Mississippi and Minnesota toward the upper right of the photograph, and Fort Snelling National Cemetery is at center right.

- Location within the state of Minnesota
- Coordinates: 44°53′34″N 93°10′50″W
- Country: United States
- State: Minnesota
- County: Hennepin County

Area
  - Total: 6.6 sq mi (17.2 km^{2})
  - Land: 6.4 sq mi (16.5 km^{2})
  - Water: 0.31 sq mi (0.8 km^{2})
- Elevation: 860 ft (260 m)

Population (2020)
  - Total: 322
  - Density: 50.5/sq mi (19.5/km^{2})
- Time zone: UTC-6 (Central (CST))
  - Summer (DST): UTC-5 (CDT)

Fort Snelling is an unorganized territory of Hennepin County in the U.S. state of Minnesota. It is named after the historic Fort Snelling, which is located within its boundaries. The district also includes Coldwater Spring park, Fort Snelling National Cemetery, Minneapolis-Saint Paul International Airport, parts of the Mississippi National River and Recreation Area, and several government facilities. As of the 2020 census the territory had a population of 322 people.

== Geography ==
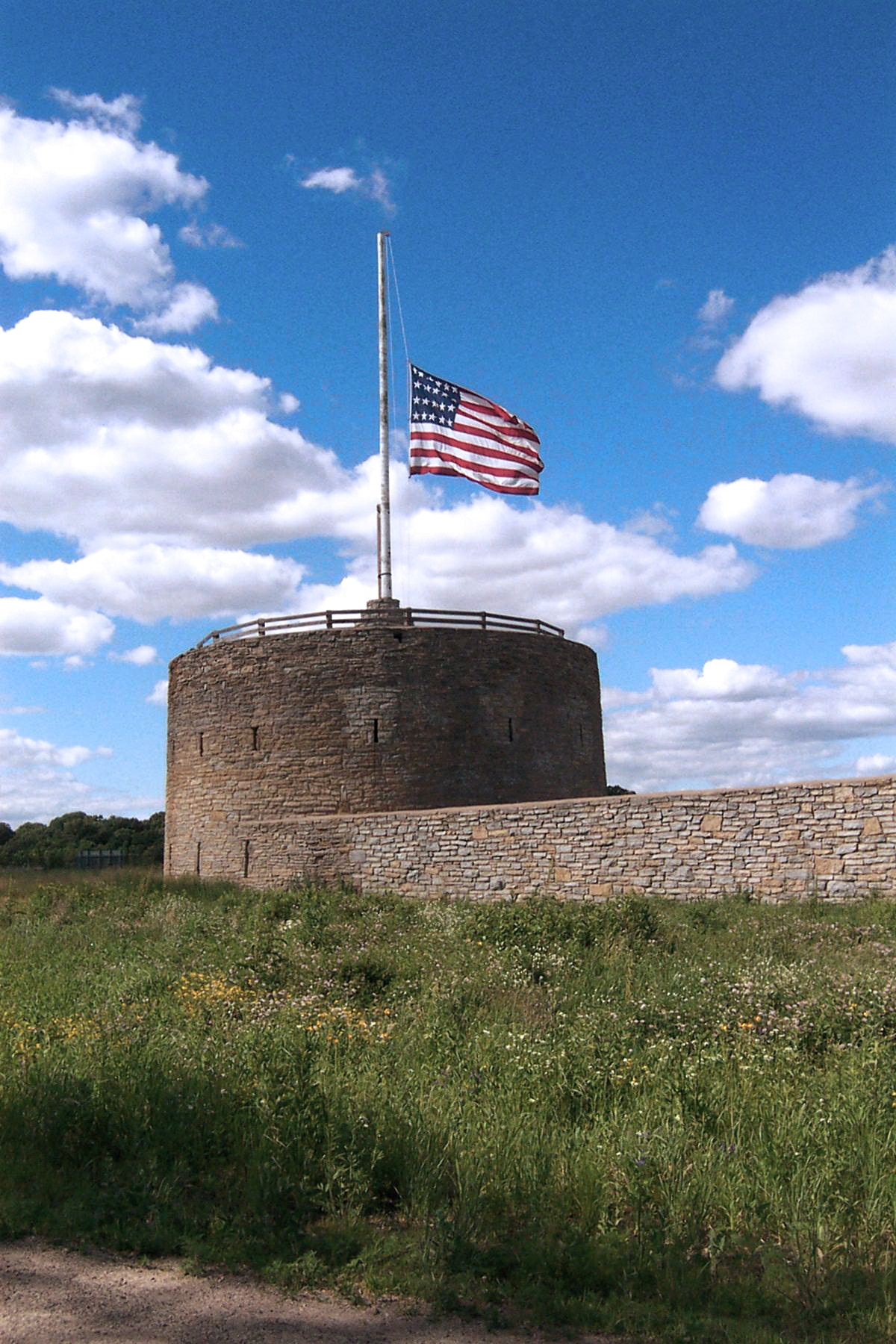
View of the Round Tower. The flag is at half-staff because former American President Ronald Reagan had died just prior to the day the photograph was taken.

The unorganized territory of Fort Snelling is just east of the city of Richfield. Historic Fort Snelling is located at the eastern end of the territory, near the confluence of the Mississippi River with the Minnesota River. It also borders Minneapolis to the north and Bloomington to the southwest, while Saint Paul in Ramsey County (including Pike Island) is to the northeast, and across the Minnesota River are Mendota and Mendota Heights in Dakota County.

For postal purposes, addresses in the eastern portion of the unorganized territory (including Terminal 1 of the Minneapolis St. Paul International Airport and the Fort Snelling historic site) are in zip code 55111 with a Saint Paul mailing address, while addresses in the western part of the territory (including the airport's Terminal 2 and the Metropolitan Airports Commission offices) are in zip code 55450 and have a Minneapolis mailing address. According to the United States Census Bureau, this unorganized territory has a total area of 17.2 km^{2} (6.7 mi^{2}). 16.5 km^{2} (6.4 mi^{2}) of it is land and 0.8 km^{2} (0.3 mi^{2}) of it is water.

Fort Snelling's territory contains numerous military and other federal facilities. These facilities include the current National Guard base at Fort Snelling, Fort Snelling National Cemetery, the Bishop Henry Whipple Federal Building, and the Minneapolis Veterans Health Administration Medical Center.

Several facilities belonging to Minnesota state government agencies such as the Minnesota Department of Transportation are also located in the territory, as are the headquarters and portions of Fort Snelling State Park and the Minnesota Valley National Wildlife Refuge.

Minneapolis–Saint Paul International Airport, however, includes most of the land area of the unorganized territory. Delta Air Lines Building C is located on the airport property and in Fort Snelling, and is used by the airline for northern and regional operations.

The office of Northern Star Council of Scouting America is located at Fort Snelling, as it its urban leadership center.

== Demographics ==
Historical population
Census	Pop.	Note	%±
1880	352		—
1890	550		56.3%
1930	2,043		—
1940	2,972		45.5%
1950	2,584		−13.1%
1960	898		−65.2%
1970	624		−30.5%
1980	223		−64.3%
1990	97		−56.5%
2000	442		355.7%
2010	149		−66.3%
2020	322		116.1%
U.S. Decennial Census

Fort Snelling was listed as an incorporated village during the 1890 Census.

In the era after World War II, residents of the unorganized territory were service members stationed at the barracks at Fort Snelling, and military families living on base housing in the Upper Post area. Over time, some parts of the fort were demolished to expand Minneapolis–Saint Paul International Airport, and the Upper Post was abandoned as housing in 1973 with ownership transferred to the Minnesota Department of Natural Resources. In the 2010s, private housing started to be developed in the Upper Post. This began with a newly built apartment complex that opened in 2015, followed by a redevelopment of all the remaining Upper Post buildings that was completed in 2022. All of this new housing is intended primarily for veterans and their families, with funding provided by federal, state, and local historical preservation and affordable housing funds.

As of the census of 2020, 322 people resided in 239 households in the unorganized territory. 83.5% of households spoke English at home and 14.6% spoke Spanish. The median household income was $18,594. 31.1% of the population was below the poverty line.
