= List of Metro (Minnesota) light rail stations =

Map of the Metro system as it stood in September 2017, showing the Blue and Green lines

Metro is a public transportation network consisting of light rail and bus rapid transit services covering the Minneapolis–Saint Paul metropolitan area. The light rail portion of the network, managed by Metro Transit, has 37 light rail stations in operation across two lines: the Blue Line, running from downtown Minneapolis to the Mall of America in Bloomington, Minnesota, and the Green Line, connecting downtown Minneapolis to downtown Saint Paul. In 2016, the Blue and Green lines respectively provided approximately 10.3 million and 12.7 million rides for a total of 23 million rides across both lines. By ridership, it is the ninth-largest light rail system in the United States.

Construction on the Blue Line, which was initially known as the Hiawatha Line, began in 2001. The line opened in two phases in 2004, beginning with a 12-station stretch from the Warehouse District/Hennepin Avenue station through the Fort Snelling station in June. In December, five more stations were opened, continuing service south of Fort Snelling to the Mall of America station. Two additional Blue Line stations opened in late 2009: a new northern terminus at Target Field and the American Boulevard station in Bloomington. Construction on the Green Line, which was initially designated as the Central Corridor, began in 2010. The line opened in its entirety in June 2014.

Fares for Metro light rail service are the same as those for most Metro Transit bus services and include unlimited transfers to other light rail and bus routes within 2.5 hours from the time a fare is paid. Two exceptions exist for Metro light rail services: fares within (but not between) downtown zones (Note: Minneapolis's downtown zone includes stations from Target Field to U.S. Bank Stadium. Saint Paul's downtown zone consists of stations from Capitol/Rice Street through Saint Paul Union Depot.) are less expensive than regular fares but may not be transferred; and there is no cost to ride between terminals 1 and 2 at the Minneapolis–Saint Paul International Airport (MSP). Many stations connect with rail or bus routes. The Target Field station provides a connection to the Northstar commuter rail line, while the Mall of America station allows for transfers to the Metro Red Line bus rapid transit service. The A Line bus rapid transit line connects with the 46th Street Blue Line station and the Snelling Avenue Green Line stop. Two Metro light rail stations – 30th Avenue and Fort Snelling – have designated park and ride lots.

Extensions to both Metro lines are planned as of 2023. The Blue Line extension will branch northward from the Target Field station, adding 11 stations to the line: two more in Minneapolis, two in Golden Valley, one each in Robbinsdale and Crystal, and five in Brooklyn Park. The Green Line extension will branch west from Target Field station and include 16 new stations: five in Minneapolis, three each in Saint Louis Park and Hopkins, one in Minnetonka, and four in Eden Prairie. The Green Line extension was originally intended to open in 2018 but, as of 2022, was delayed until 2027. Passenger service was planned to begin on the Blue Line extension in 2023, but an issue with securing right-of-way resulted in the need to rework the line's route, resulting in a new estimate of 2028.

== Stations ==
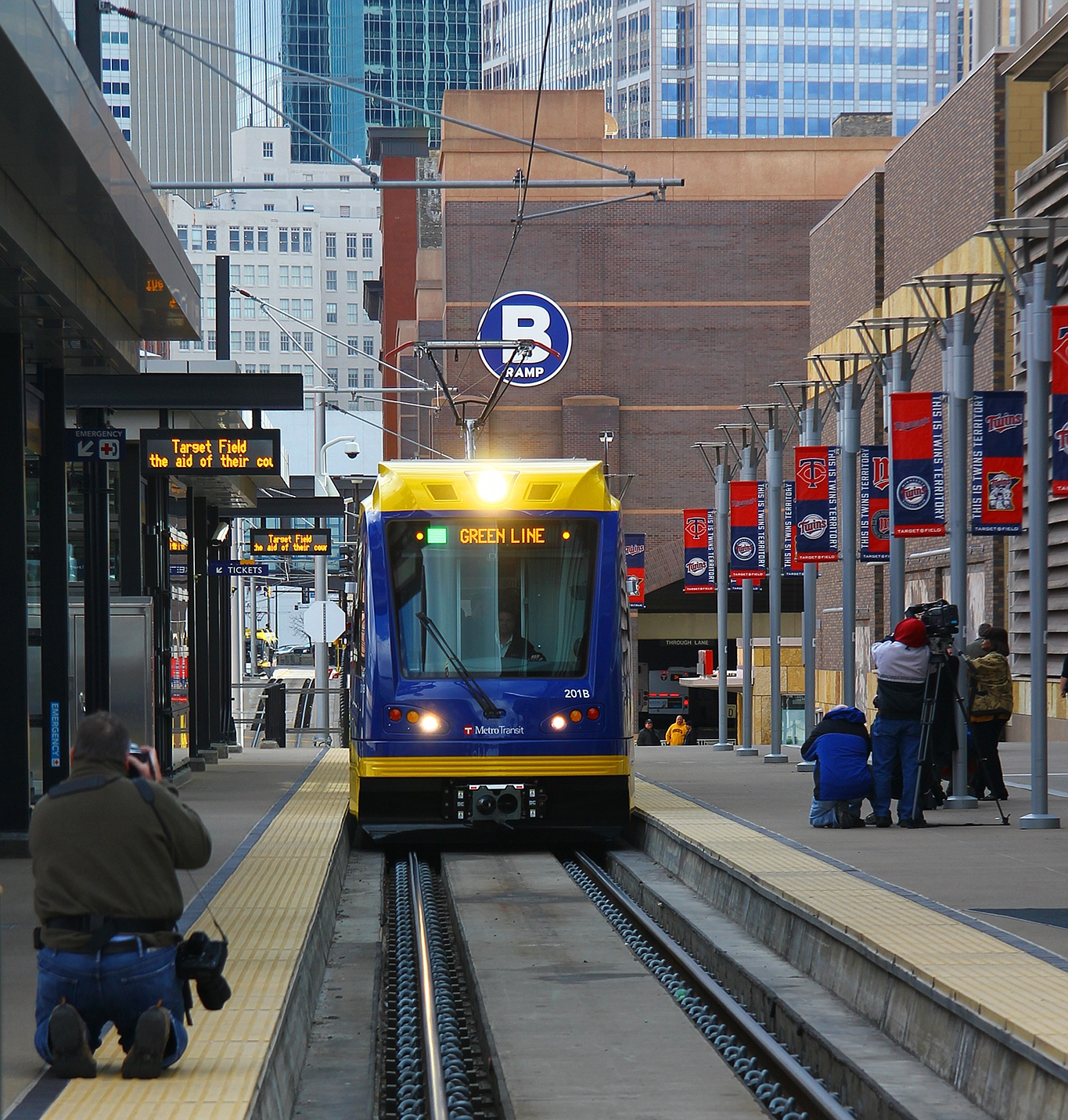
Target Field station is the northern terminus for both the Green and Blue lines.

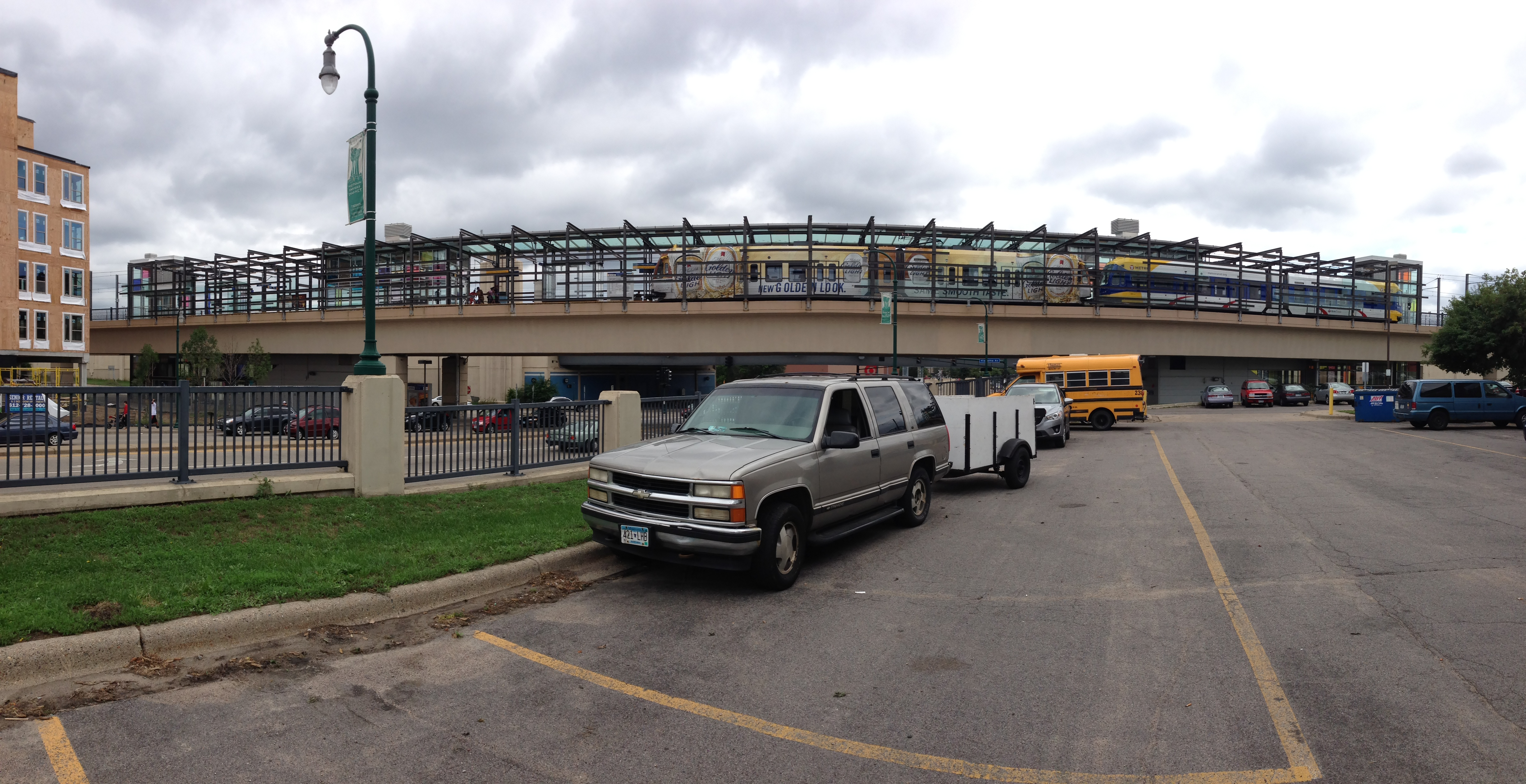
The elevated Lake Street/Midtown station on the Blue Line

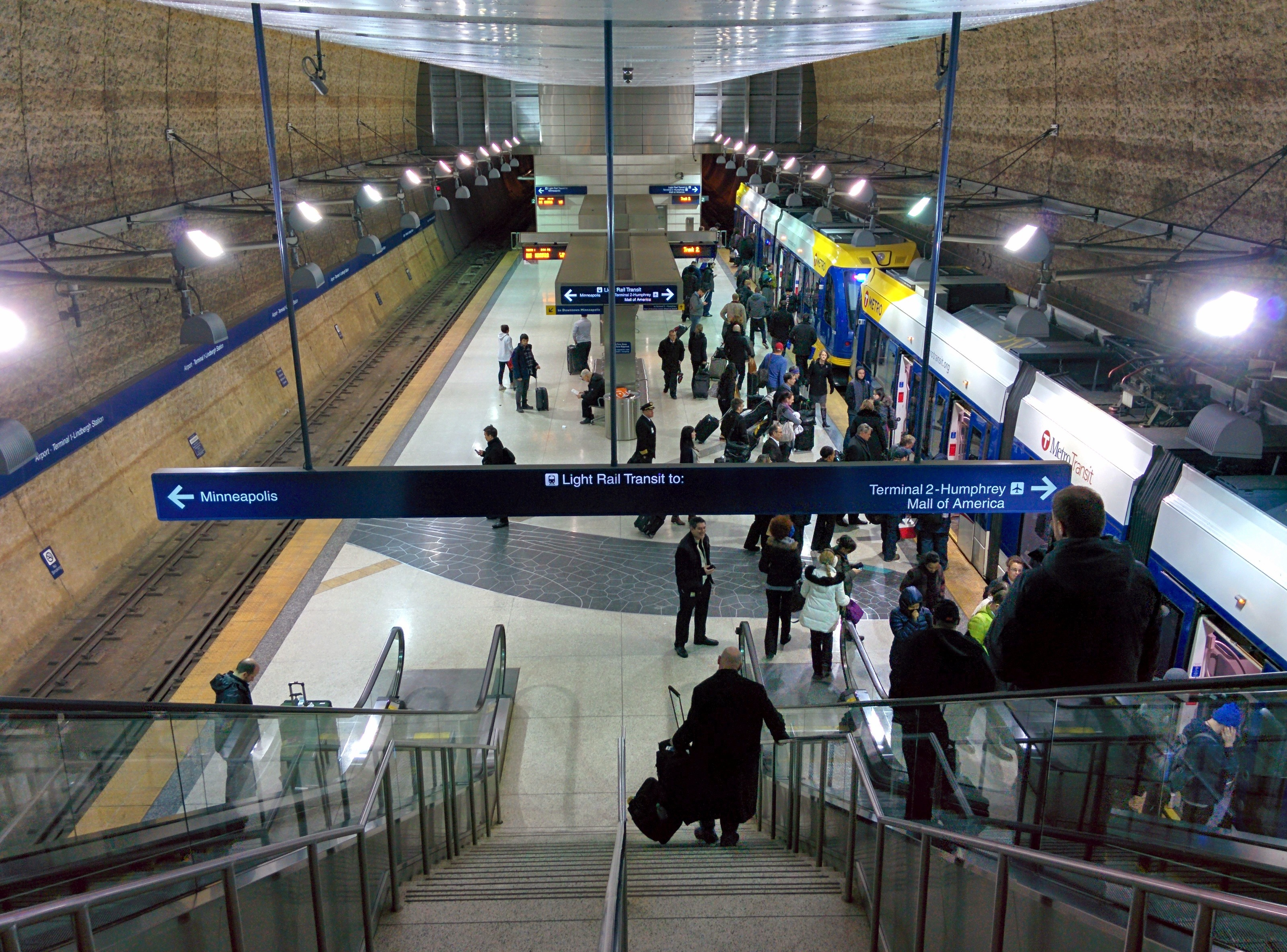
The underground Terminal 1–Lindbergh station on the Blue Line

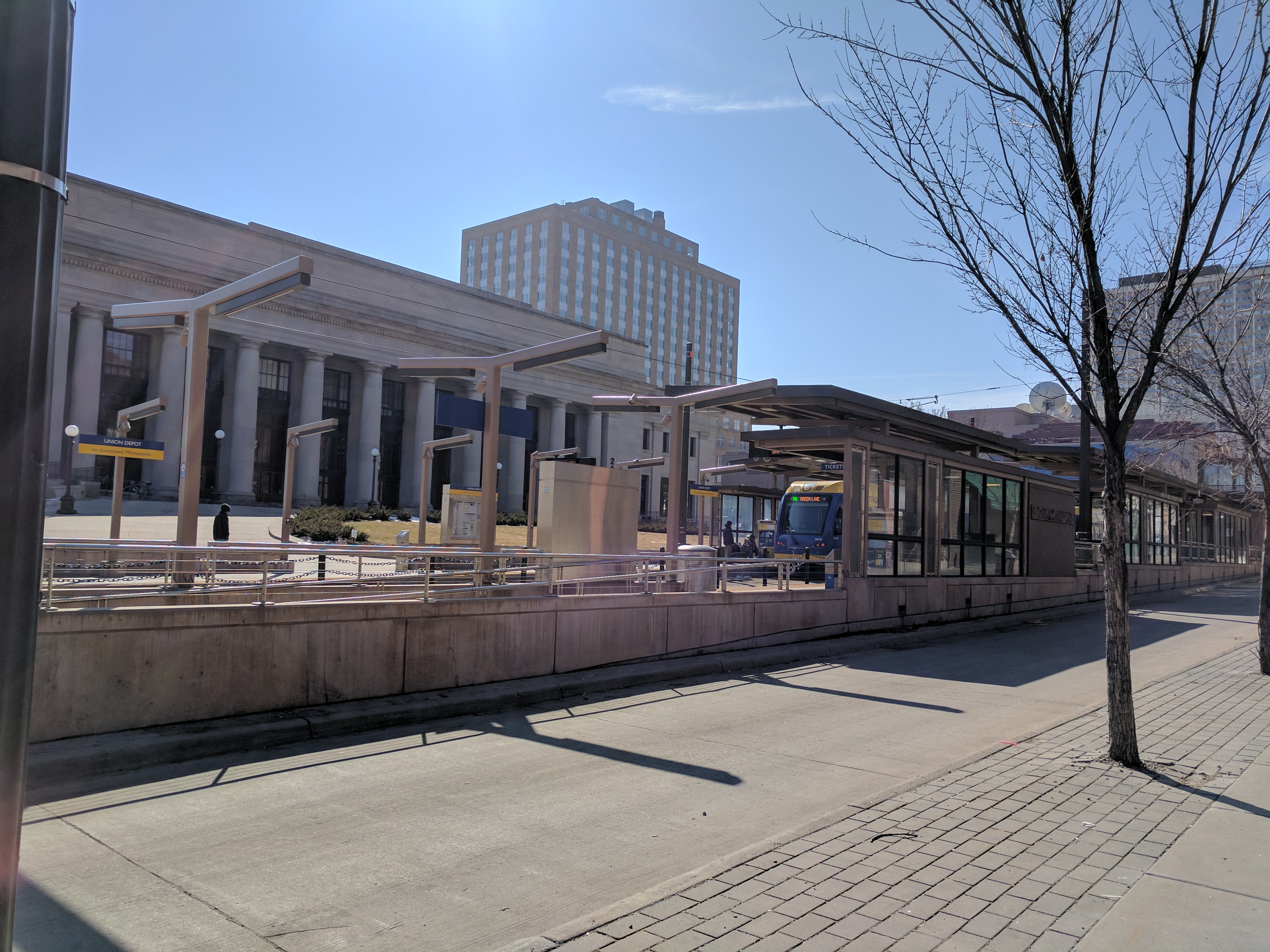
Saint Paul Union Depot, the Green Line's southern terminus

Legend
*	Downtown fare zone stations
†	Terminal stations
*†	Terminal / downtown fare zone stations
Fare-free airport zone	Free airport zone

Lines

Blue Line
Green Line

Extant Metro light rail stations
Station	Lines	Locality	Opened	Ref(s).
10th Street*	Green Line	Saint Paul	June 14, 2014	
30th Avenue	Blue Line	Bloomington	December 4, 2004	
38th Street	Blue Line	Minneapolis	June 26, 2004	
46th Street	Blue Line	Minneapolis	June 26, 2004	
50th Street/Minnehaha Park	Blue Line	Minneapolis	June 26, 2004	
American Boulevard	Blue Line	Bloomington	December 12, 2009	
Bloomington Central	Blue Line	Bloomington	December 4, 2004	
Capitol/Rice Street*	Green Line	Saint Paul	June 14, 2014	
Cedar-Riverside	Blue Line	Minneapolis	June 26, 2004	
Central*	Green Line	Saint Paul	June 14, 2014	
Dale Street	Green Line	Saint Paul	June 14, 2014	
East Bank	Green Line	Minneapolis	June 14, 2014	
Fairview Avenue	Green Line	Saint Paul	June 14, 2014	
Fort Snelling	Blue Line	Fort Snelling	June 26, 2004	
Franklin Avenue	Blue Line	Minneapolis	June 26, 2004	
Government Plaza*	Blue Line; Green Line	Minneapolis	June 26, 2004	
Hamline Avenue	Green Line	Saint Paul	June 14, 2014	
Lake Street/Midtown	Blue Line	Minneapolis	June 26, 2004	
Lexington Parkway	Green Line	Saint Paul	June 14, 2014	
Mall of America†	Blue Line	Bloomington	December 4, 2004	
Nicollet Mall*	Blue Line; Green Line	Minneapolis	June 26, 2004	
Prospect Park	Green Line	Minneapolis	June 14, 2014	
Raymond Avenue	Green Line	Saint Paul	June 14, 2014	
Robert Street*	Green Line	Saint Paul	June 14, 2014	
Saint Paul Union Depot*†	Green Line	Saint Paul	June 14, 2014	
Snelling Avenue	Green Line	Saint Paul	June 14, 2014	
Stadium Village	Green Line	Minneapolis	June 14, 2014	
Target Field*†	Blue Line; Green Line	Minneapolis	November 14, 2009	
Terminal 1–Lindbergh	Blue Line	Fort Snelling	December 4, 2004	
Terminal 2–Humphrey	Blue Line	Fort Snelling	December 4, 2004	
U.S. Bank Stadium*	Blue Line; Green Line	Minneapolis	June 26, 2004	
VA Medical Center	Blue Line	Fort Snelling	June 26, 2004	
Victoria Street	Green Line	Saint Paul	June 14, 2014	
Warehouse District/Hennepin Avenue*	Blue Line; Green Line	Minneapolis	June 26, 2004	
West Bank	Green Line	Minneapolis	June 14, 2014	
Western Avenue	Green Line	Saint Paul	June 14, 2014	
Westgate	Green Line	Saint Paul	June 14, 2014	

== Planned stations ==
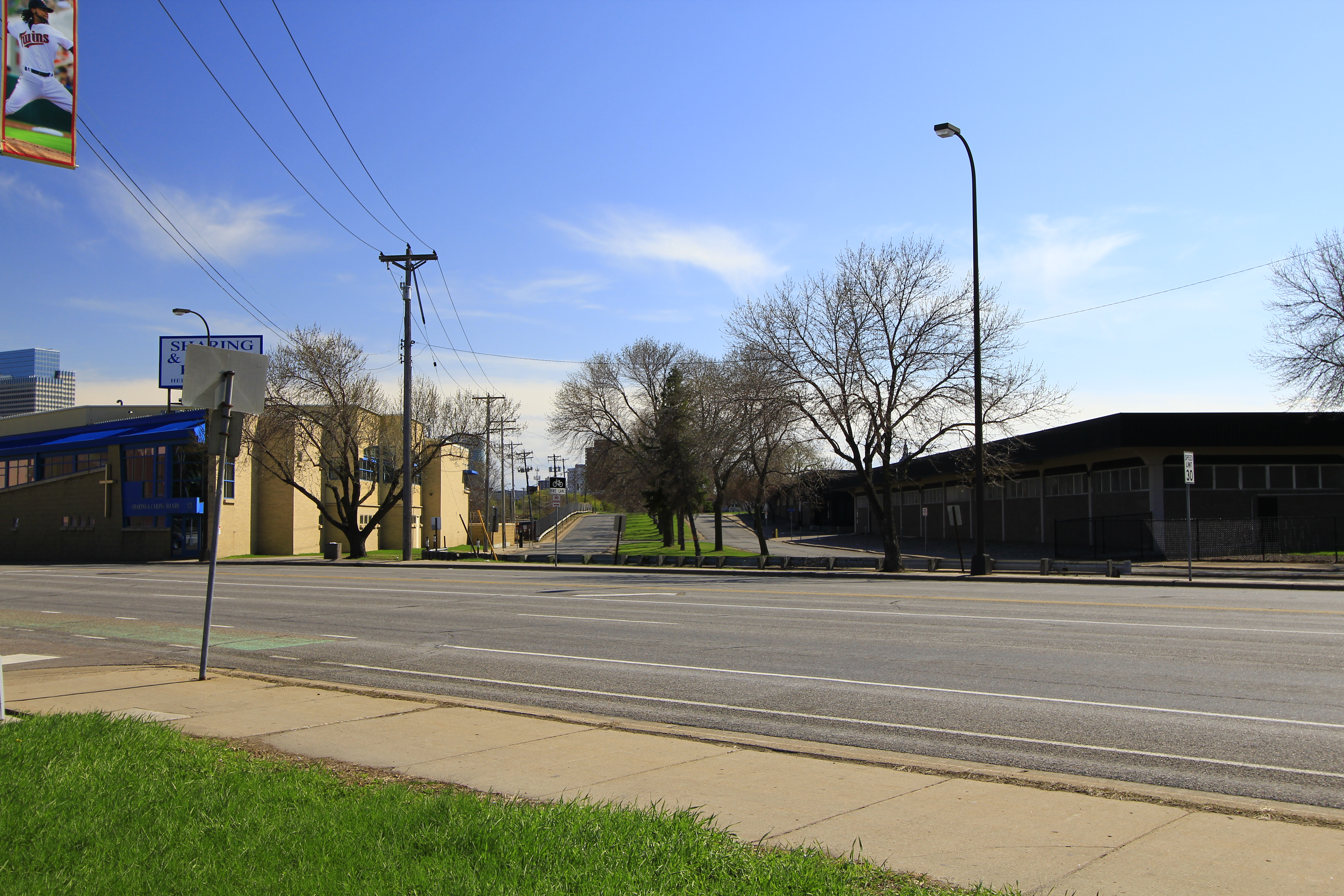
The site of the planned Royalston Avenue/Farmers Market station on the extended Green Line in Minneapolis

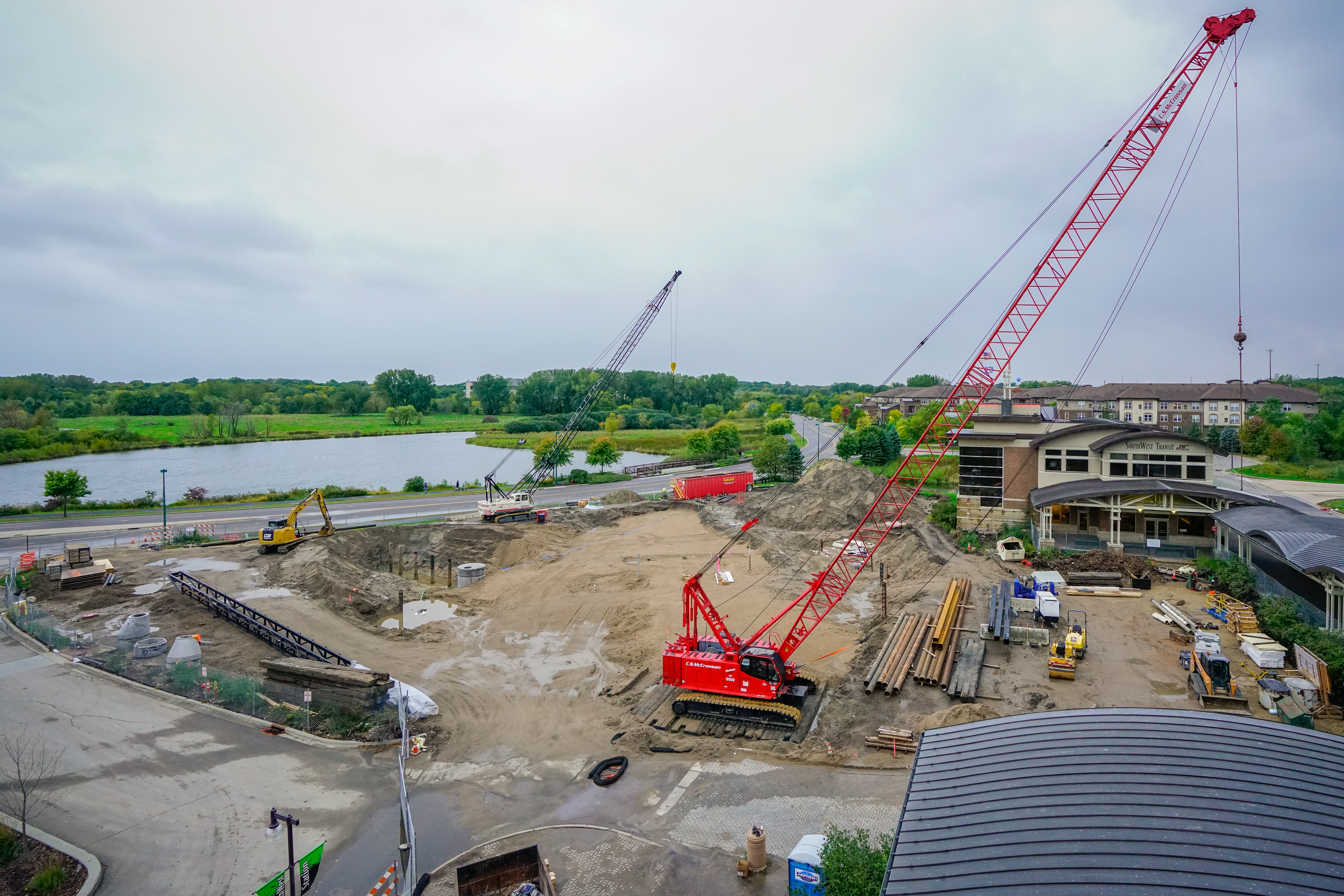
Work underway in 2019 on the SouthWest station, part of the extended Green Line to Eden Prairie

Planned Metro light rail stations
Station	Lines	Locality	Planned opening
63rd Avenue	Blue Line	Brooklyn Park	2028
85th Avenue	Blue Line	Brooklyn Park	2028
93rd Avenue	Blue Line	Brooklyn Park	2028
Bass Lake Road	Blue Line	Crystal	2028
Bassett Creek Valley	Green Line	Minneapolis	July 12, 2027
Beltline Boulevard	Green Line	Saint Louis Park	July 12, 2027
Blake Road	Green Line	Hopkins	July 12, 2027
Brooklyn Boulevard	Blue Line	Brooklyn Park	2028
Bryn Mawr	Green Line	Minneapolis	July 12, 2027
City West	Green Line	Eden Prairie	July 12, 2027
Downtown Hopkins	Green Line	Hopkins	July 12, 2027
Eden Prairie Town Center	Green Line	Eden Prairie	July 12, 2027
Golden Triangle	Green Line	Eden Prairie	July 12, 2027
Golden Valley Road	Blue Line	Golden Valley	2028
Louisiana Avenue	Green Line	Saint Louis Park	July 12, 2027
Oak Grove Parkway	Blue Line	Brooklyn Park	2028
Opus	Green Line	Minnetonka	July 12, 2027
Penn Avenue	Blue Line	Minneapolis	2028
Plymouth Avenue/Theodore Wirth Park	Blue Line	Golden Valley	2028
Robbinsdale	Blue Line	Robbinsdale	2028
Royalston Avenue/Farmers Market	Green Line	Minneapolis	July 12, 2027
Shady Oak	Green Line	Hopkins	July 12, 2027
SouthWest†	Green Line	Eden Prairie	July 12, 2027
Van White Boulevard	Blue Line	Minneapolis	2028
West 21st Street	Green Line	Minneapolis	July 12, 2027
West Lake Street	Green Line	Minneapolis	July 12, 2027
Wooddale Avenue	Green Line	Saint Louis Park	July 12, 2027

=== Deferred/cancelled stations ===
Along the Green Line extension, two additional stations, both in Eden Prairie, were originally included in plans for the Green Line extension. One, Mitchell Road, was cut entirely from plans while another, Eden Prairie Town Center, was deferred until a later date. In October 2018, Eden Prairie Town Center received a full funding grant agreement and will open with the rest of the line when it is complete. Along the Metro Blue Line Extension, four planned stations (Van White Boulevard, Penn Avenue, Plymouth Avenue/Theodore Wirth Park, and Golden Valley Road) were abandoned after BNSF Railway refused access to their Monticello Subdivision, forcing Metro Transit and the Metropolitan Council to find an alternative alignment. Three other stations (Robbinsdale, Bass Lake Road, and 63rd Avenue) also along the Monticello Subdivision are still being pursued, albeit outside the railroad corridor.
