= Minneapolis station =

Minneapolis station may refer to:

- Target Field station, a multimodal train station in Minneapolis
- Minneapolis–Saint Paul Joint Air Reserve Station, a United States Air Force base at Minneapolis–Saint Paul International Airport
- Chicago, Milwaukee, St. Paul and Pacific Depot Freight House and Train Shed, a historic train station in Minneapolis
- Minneapolis Great Northern Depot, a historic train station in Minneapolis, demolished in 1978

== See also ==
- Saint Paul Union Depot, the main train station in Saint Paul, Minnesota
- List of Metro (Minnesota) light rail stations
