= 30th Avenue station (Metro Transit) =

Light rail station in Bloomington, Minnesota

30th Avenue
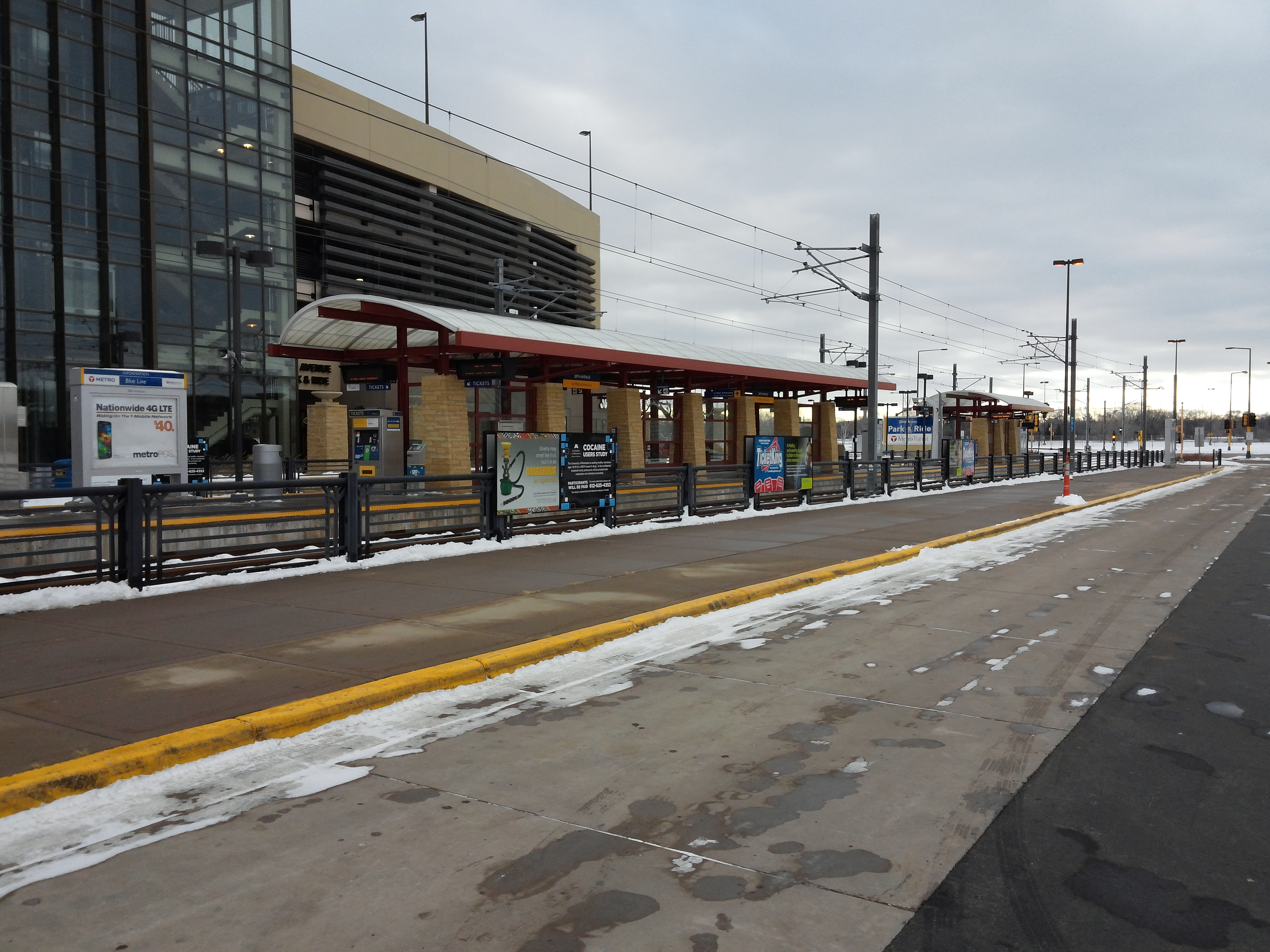
- Station platform in 2015

General information
- Location: 8100 30th Avenue South; Bloomington, Minnesota
- Coordinates: 44°51′21″N 93°13′54″W
- Owner: Metro Transit
- Platforms: 1 island platform
- Tracks: 2
- Connections: Metro Transit: 54, 444, 495, 538, 539

Construction
- Structure type: At-grade
- Parking: 1,443 spaces
- Accessible: Yes

History
- Opened: December 4, 2004
- Former names: 28th Avenue (before June 11, 2022)

Passengers
- 2025: 280 daily ▲5.7%
- Rank: 35 out of 37

Services
Preceding station	Metro	Following station
Mall of America Terminus	Blue Line	Bloomington Central toward Target Field
Former services
Preceding station	Metro	Following station
Mall of America Terminus	Red Line Drop-off only	Cedar Grove One-way operation
Future services
Preceding station	Metro	Following station
Mall of America Terminus	J Line	American Boulevard toward Saint Paul Union Depot
Intermediate stations to be determined
Location

30th Avenue station is a light rail and bus station on the Blue Line in the Twin Cities region of the U.S. state of Minnesota. The station opened with the second phase of the Hiawatha Line on December 4, 2004. It has a 1,585-space park and ride facility. The south parking lot was closed for construction of a 1,443 space parking ramp, which opened in Fall 2008.

Red Line began to serve the station on June 22, 2013, going northbound only. Red Line service to 30th Avenue ended on May 19, 2017.

Because it was deliberately made difficult for drivers to park at the Mall of America and then ride the light rail, this is an easy alternative. It is only about two blocks from the Mall of America and is much more convenient for drivers to park and ride.

The station was originally 28th Avenue station and was renamed to the adjacent 30th Avenue in summer 2022 when 28th Avenue was renamed to Winstead Way in honor of former Bloomington mayor, Gene Winstead. The cost to change the station name is estimated to be $15,000.

== Bus connections ==
From 30th Avenue Station, there is a direct bus connection to Route 54 which goes to downtown Saint Paul.
