= Bloomington Central station =

Bloomington Light Rail Station

Bloomington Central
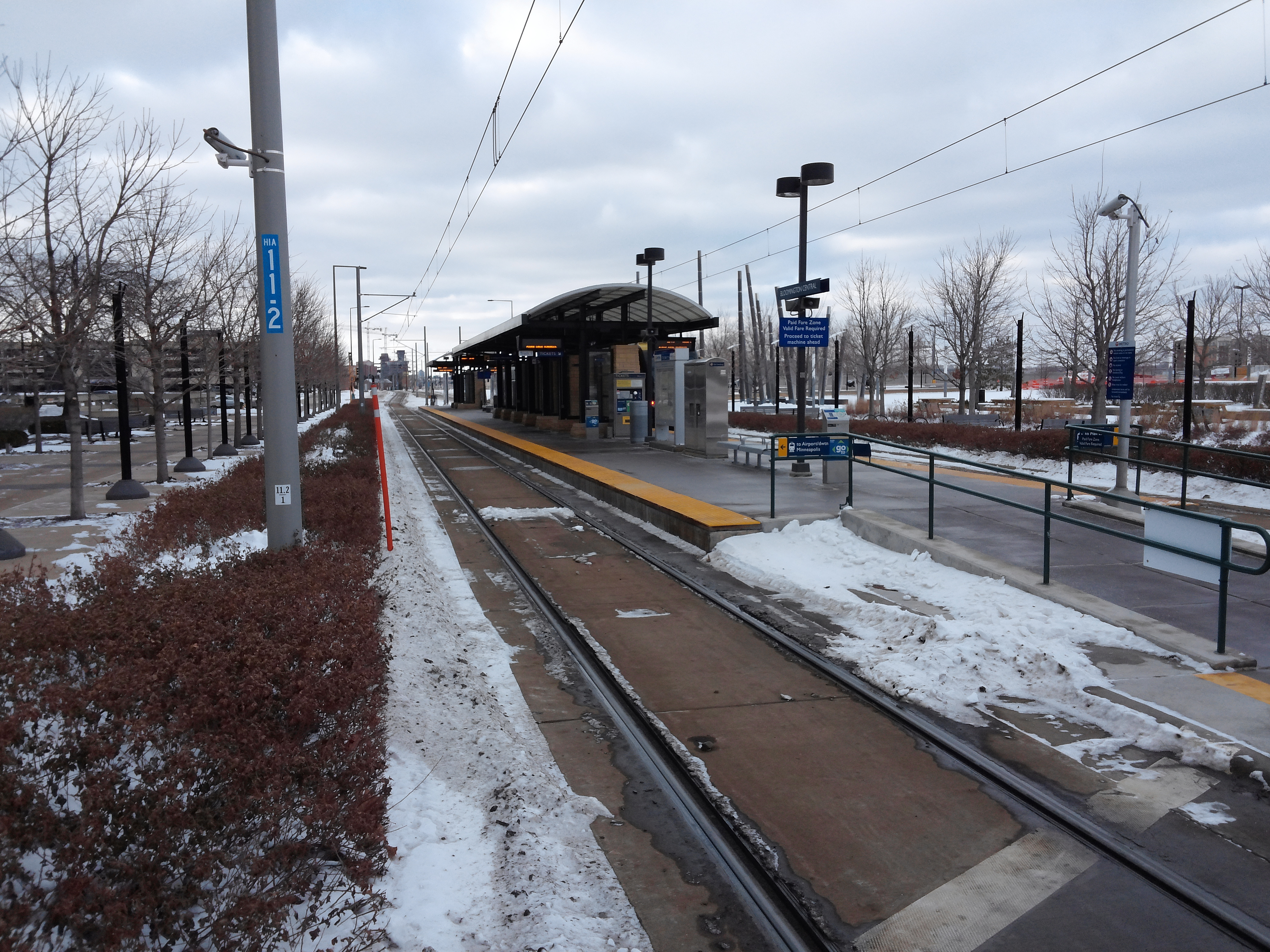
- Station platform in 2015

General information
- Location: 8101 31st Avenue South; Bloomington, Minnesota
- Coordinates: 44°51′23″N 93°13′35″W
- Owner: Metro Transit
- Platforms: 1 island platform
- Tracks: 2

Construction
- Structure type: At-grade
- Accessible: Yes

History
- Opened: December 4, 2004

Passengers
- 2025: 212 daily ▲3.9%
- Rank: 37 out of 37

Services
Preceding station	Metro	Following station
30th Avenue toward Mall of America	Blue Line	American Boulevard toward Target Field

Future services
Preceding station	Metro	Following station
30th Avenue toward Mall of America	J Line	American Boulevard toward Saint Paul Union Depot
Location

Bloomington Central Station is a light rail station on the Metro Blue Line in the Twin Cities region of the U.S. state of Minnesota.

The area surrounding the station was formerly the headquarters of Control Data Corporation. The company's largest office tower still remains and is now the headquarters of HealthPartners.

Since the station was opened in 2004, the area has been developed as a transit-oriented development. The station is located in an urban park with paths and art pieces. The 50-acre area immediately surrounding the station features the HealthPartners headquarters building, a condominium, a hotel, and several new apartment buildings featuring a coffee shop and grocery store. Like the nearby American Boulevard Station, it is in close proximity to the Minnesota Valley National Wildlife Refuge.

The platform of Bloomington Central Station had the first 17 Fibonacci numbers written in binary using different colored bricks.

The station has the least amount of passengers of any Metro Transit light rail stop at 204 per day.
