= Terminal 1–Lindbergh station =

Light rail station in Minneapolis

Terminal 1–Lindbergh
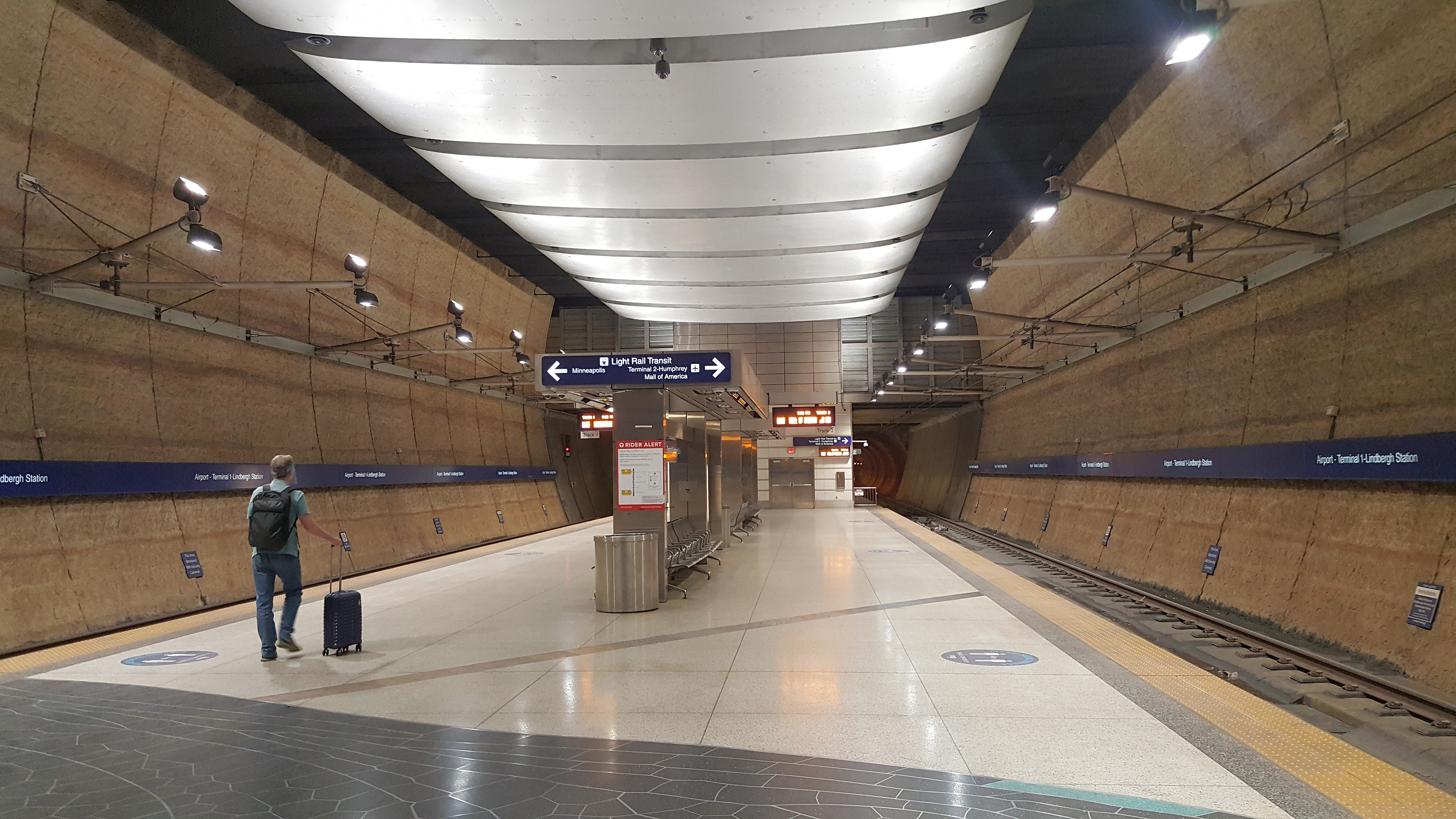
- Terminal 1–Lindbergh station platform in 2021

General information
- Location: 6450 Glumack Drive; Fort Snelling, Minnesota
- Coordinates: 44°52′52″N 93°12′21″W
- Owner: Metropolitan Airports Commission
- Platforms: 1 island platform
- Tracks: 2
- Connections: MSP Airport Trams; Metro Transit: 54

Construction
- Structure type: Underground
- Depth: 69 ft (21 m)
- Parking: Paid parking nearby
- Accessible: Yes

Other information
- Fare zone: Airport: Free service to Terminal 2–Humphrey station, standard fare to all other stations

History
- Opened: December 4, 2004

Passengers
- 2025: 1,791 daily ▼0.4%
- Rank: 5 out of 37

Services
Preceding station	Metro	Following station
Terminal 2–Humphrey toward Mall of America	Blue Line	Fort Snelling toward Target Field
Terminal 2–Humphrey Terminus	Airport Shuttle Late-night service	Terminus
Location

Terminal 1–Lindbergh station is a light rail station on the Metro Blue Line. It is the only underground station on the Blue Line and is located 69 feet (21 m) below ground level at Minneapolis–Saint Paul International Airport. It is a center-platform station that is accessed by escalator or elevator. Service began at the site when the second phase of the Blue Line opened on December 4, 2004.

== Design ==
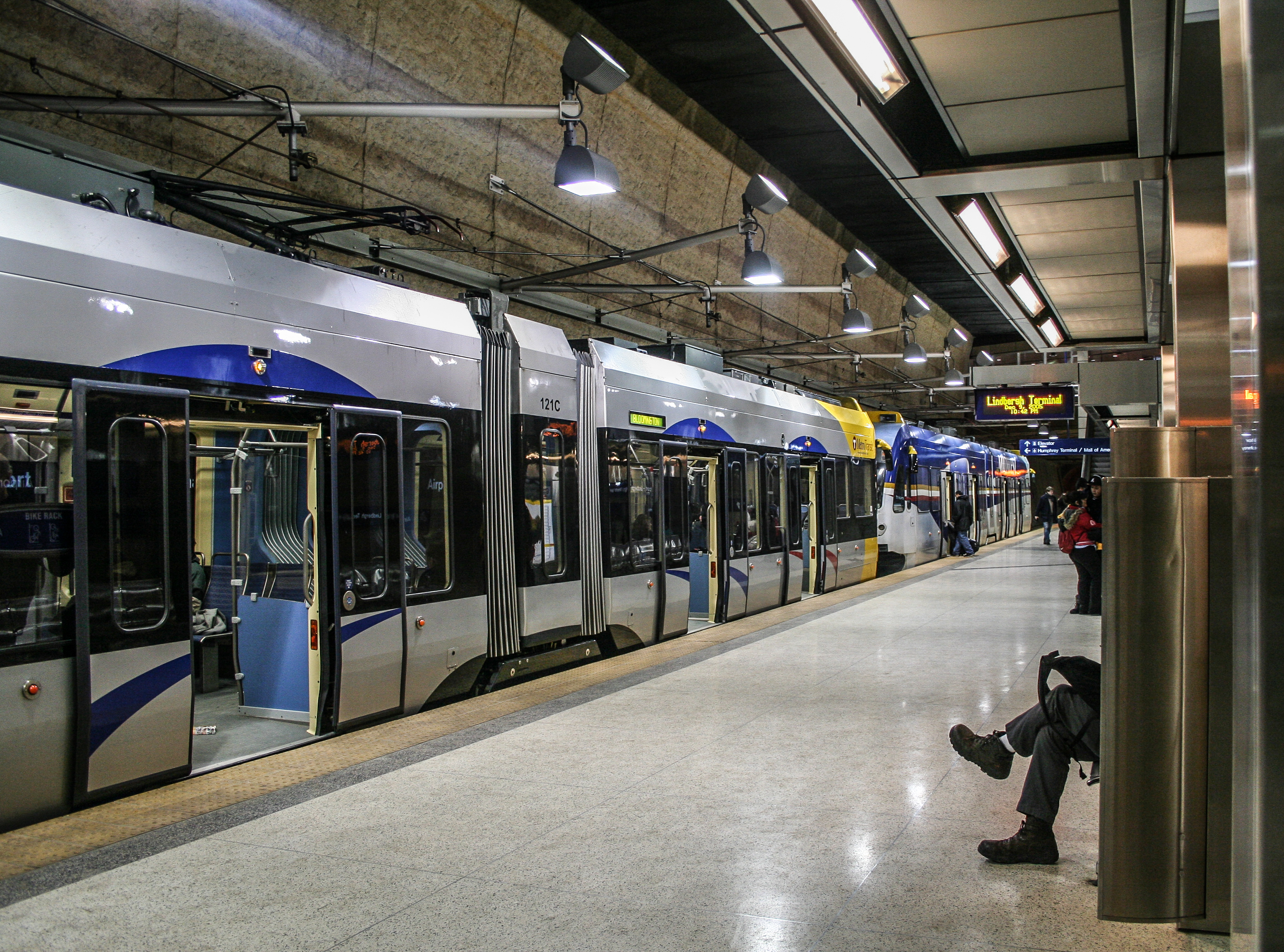
Blue Line train stopped at Terminal 1–Lindbergh station

The location of this station directly below a major airport caused challenges for its designers. The tunnel and the station both had to be carefully designed to meet Federal Aviation Administration safety requirements. Passengers can access this station from the transit center in the "Hub Building", which is reached by taking the Minneapolis–St. Paul Airport Trams, a people mover from the main terminal.

Due to concerns about terrorism, the tunnels were designed to be highly blast-resistant. The underground portion was the costliest section of the entire rail project.

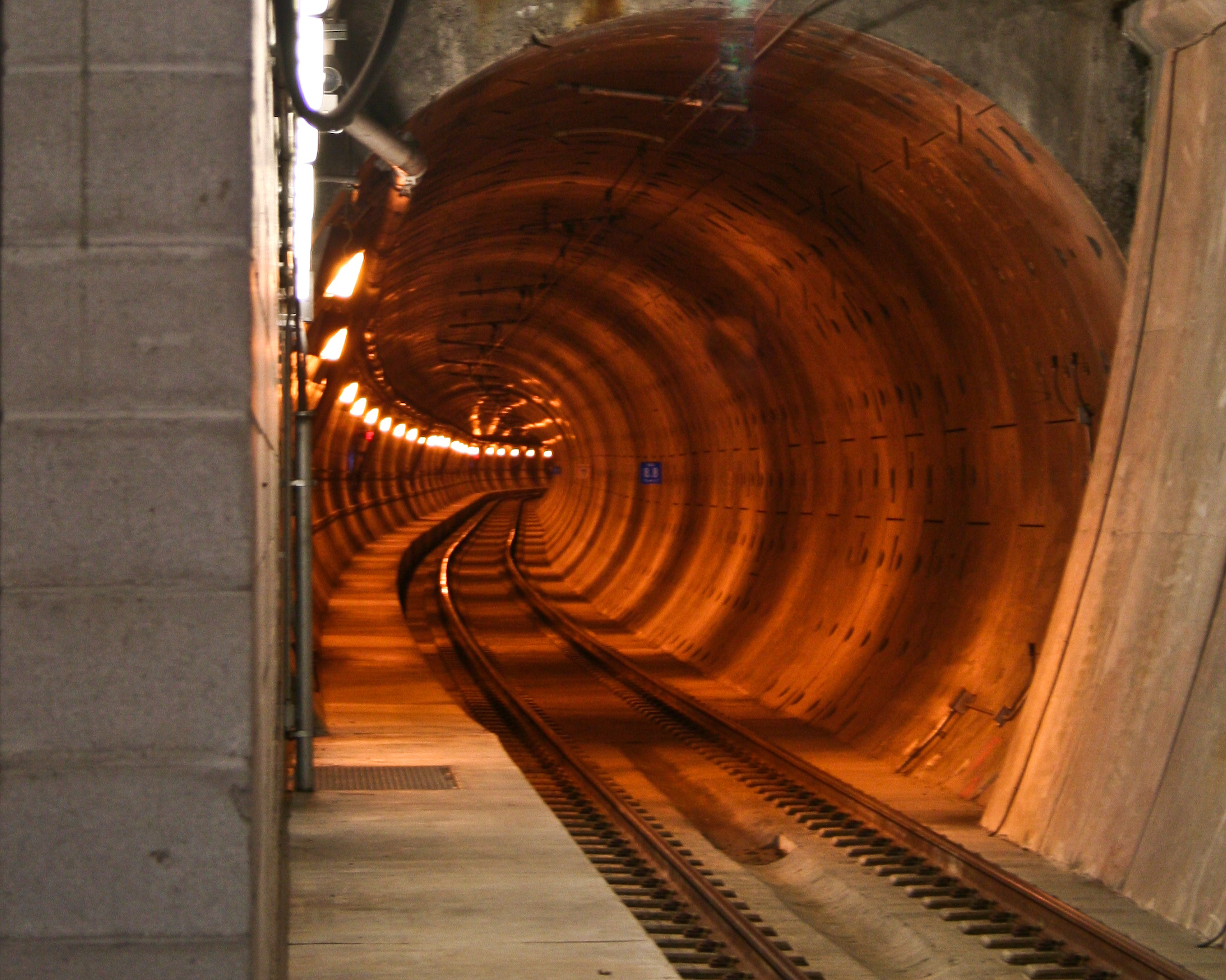
One of the tunnel tubes out of the station

This station was excavated after the two main tunnel tubes were constructed with a tunnel boring machine (though cut and cover was used near the ends of the tunnels). The station box is 40 feet (12 m) high, 63 feet (19 m) wide, and approximately 300 feet (91 m) long. The station is the largest subterranean public space in Minnesota. During the excavation of the tunnels, a buried river valley was encountered a few hundred feet south of the station.

Lindbergh Station is unheated, but maintains a temperature of roughly 50–60 °F (10–16 °C) year-round because of its underground location.

== Service ==
=== Airport shuttle operation ===
Service between this station and Terminal 2–Humphrey station is free to passengers and operates 24-hours a day. The Blue Line is the main way for travelers to transfer between terminals. Along with Terminal 2-Humphrey station, the station is owned and maintained by the Metropolitan Airports Commission rather than Metro Transit.

=== Connections ===
From the station, there is a direct bus connection to Route 54 to Downtown Saint Paul and the Mall of America.

== Public art ==
The station contains the artwork Dragonfly by Andrea Myklebust and Stanton Sears. The artwork consists of a 30 ft (9.1 m) by 45 ft (14 m) terrazzo floor pattern of a dragonfly wing on platform complemented by an airfoil wing suspended from the ceiling. The artwork is owned and maintained by the Minneapolis-Saint Paul International Airport. Myklebust and Sears have several other terrazzo floor artworks at the airport. The walls of the station are fabricated to look like an outcrop of Saint Peter Sandstone through which the tunnels have been bored.
