= Terminal 2–Humphrey station =

Light rail station in Minneapolis

Terminal 2–Humphrey
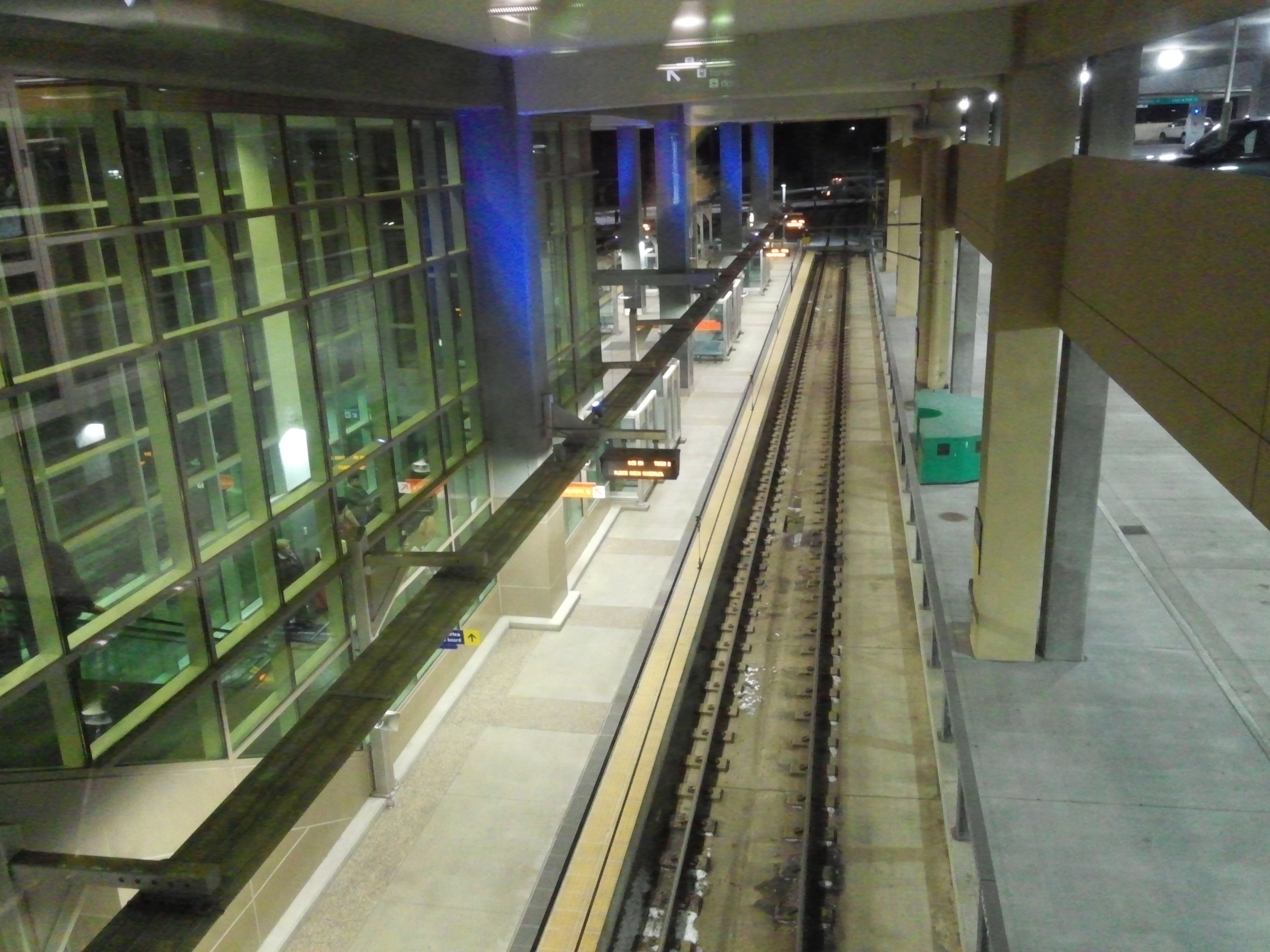
- Terminal 2–Humphrey station platform in 2014

General information
- Location: 7115 Humphrey Drive; Fort Snelling, Minnesota
- Coordinates: 44°52′27″N 93°13′27″W
- Owner: Metropolitan Airports Commission
- Platforms: 1 island platform
- Tracks: 2

Construction
- Structure type: At-grade, under parking deck
- Parking: Paid parking nearby
- Accessible: Yes

Other information
- Fare zone: Airport: Free service to Terminal 1–Lindbergh station, standard fare to all other stations

History
- Opened: December 4, 2004

Passengers
- 2025: 1,607 daily ▼2.4%
- Rank: 7 out of 37

Services
Preceding station	Metro	Following station
American Boulevard toward Mall of America	Blue Line	Terminal 1–Lindbergh toward Target Field
Terminus	Airport Shuttle Late-night service	Terminal 1–Lindbergh Terminus
Location

Terminal 2–Humphrey station is a light rail station is on the Metro Blue Line. It is the fifteenth stop southbound.

This is an island platform station and is typically accessed via a partially covered walkway from Terminal 2 of the Minneapolis–Saint Paul International Airport, also known as the Humphrey Terminal. Service began at this station when the second phase of the Blue Line opened on December 4, 2004.

The southern portal to the tunnels underneath the airport is located just to the north of this station. Service between this station and Terminal 1–Lindbergh station is free to passengers and operates 24 hours a day. The Blue Line is the main mode of transportation to transfer between terminals.

Many employees who work at the airport park at the smaller Terminal 2 and take the Blue Line to the larger Terminal 1. When COVID-19 reduced travel demand, many employees were able to park directly at Terminal 1. Travel demand rebounded by 2022 which led to concerns about parking capacity at Terminal 1. Some airport workers were directed to resume parking at Terminal 2 but some workers expressed apprehension due to behavior and crime on the trains and at stations. In early 2023, Metro Transit and the Metropolitan Airport Commission came to an agreement for airport police and Metro Transit police officers to patrol the stations and trains between the airport terminals. The mutual aid agreement was extended until February 2024 when Metro Transit determined that the agreements were no longer needed. Private security guards hired by Metro Transit began patrolling the stations and trains between stations for 21 hours out of the day.

== Notable places nearby ==
- Minneapolis–Saint Paul International Airport
- Fort Snelling National Cemetery
