= Metro Blue Line (Minnesota) =

Light rail line in Hennepin County, Minnesota

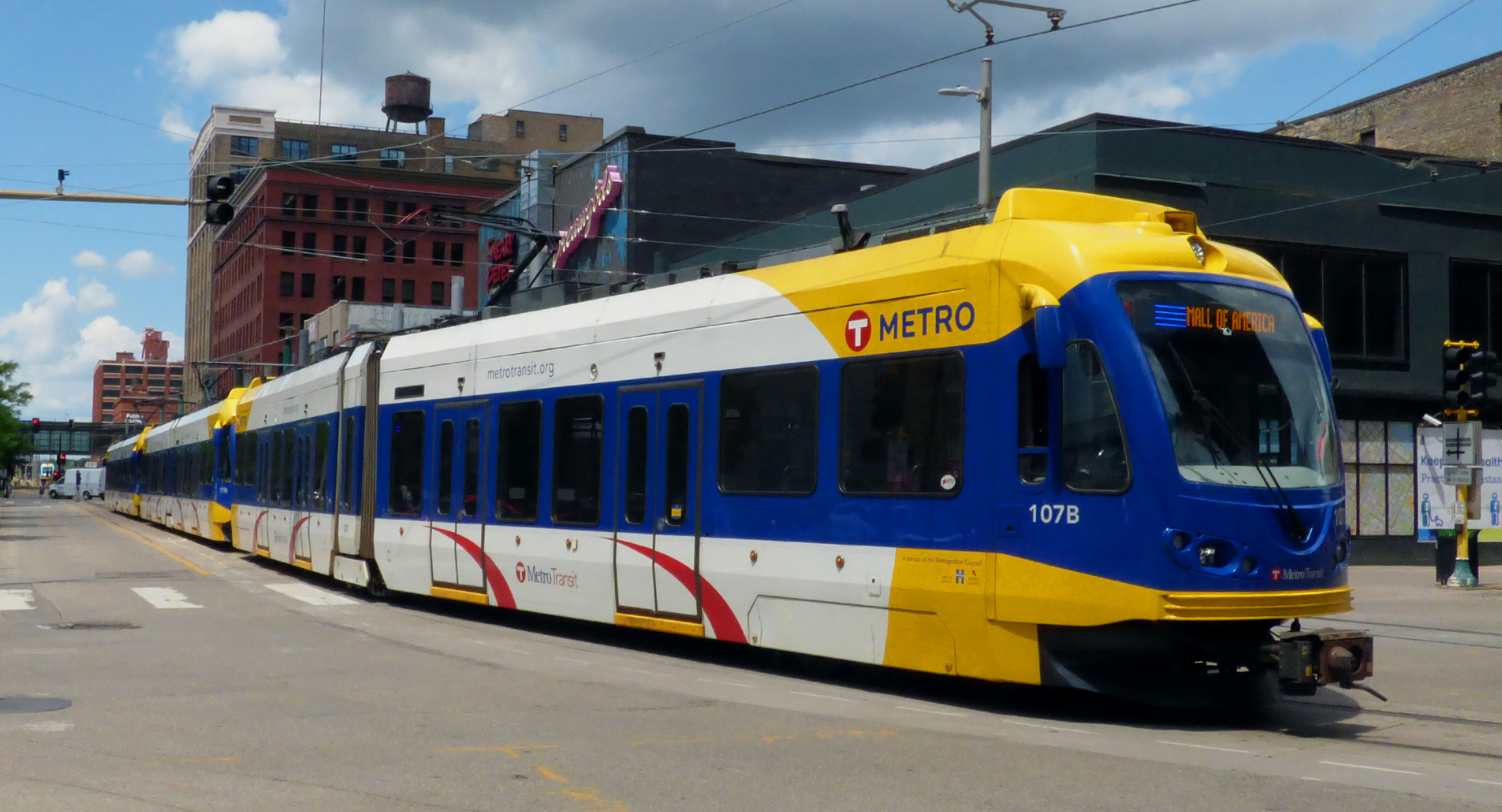
- Blue Line light rail in downtown Minneapolis

Overview
- Locale: Minneapolis–St. Paul
- Termini: Target Field (north); Mall of America (south)
- Stations: 19 open, 13 proposed
- Website: Metro Blue Line

Service
- Type: Light rail
- System: Metro
- Route number: 901
- Operator: Metro Transit
- Rolling stock: Bombardier LF-70 or Siemens S70 and S700; 3-car trains (typical, maximum)
- Daily ridership: 16,211 (avg. weekday, 2025)

History
- Opened: June 26, 2004; 22 years ago

Technical
- Line length: 12 mi (19 km)
- Number of tracks: 2
- Character: Primarily at-grade in separated right of way
- Track gauge: 4 ft 8 1/2 in (1,435 mm) standard gauge
- Minimum radius: 82 feet (25 m)
- Electrification: Overhead line, 750 V DC
- Operating speed: 55 mph (89 km/h) max 18 mph (29 km/h) average

The Metro Blue Line is a 12-mile (19.3 km) light rail line in Hennepin County, Minnesota, that is part of the Metro network. It travels from downtown Minneapolis to Minneapolis–Saint Paul International Airport and the southern suburb of Bloomington. Formerly the Hiawatha Line (Route 55) prior to May 2013, the line was originally named after the Milwaukee Road's Hiawatha passenger train and Hiawatha Avenue, reusing infrastructure from the former and running parallel to the latter for a portion of the route. The line opened June 26, 2004, and was the first light rail service in Minnesota. An extension is planned to open in 2030.

The Blue Line is operated by Metro Transit, the primary bus and train operator in the Twin Cities. As of December 2022, the service operates from approximately 3:19 am to 12:50 am with 15‑minute headways most of the day. The route averaged 32,928 daily riders in 2019, representing 13 percent of Metro Transit's ridership. The line carried 10.6 million riders in 2015.

In South Minneapolis, several bus routes converge at transit centers along the line, offering connections to other Metro lines and frequent bus routes. The line has two park and ride stations, the Fort Snelling and 30th Avenue stations, with a combined capacity of 2,569 vehicles. Major destinations along the corridor include downtown Minneapolis, Lake Street, Minnehaha Park, Minneapolis–St. Paul International Airport, and the Mall of America. At the airport, the Blue Line provides free, 24/7 service between Lindbergh and Humphrey terminals. A night owl shuttle train, the Airport Shuttle, runs between terminals during times when no Blue Line service is scheduled.

== History ==
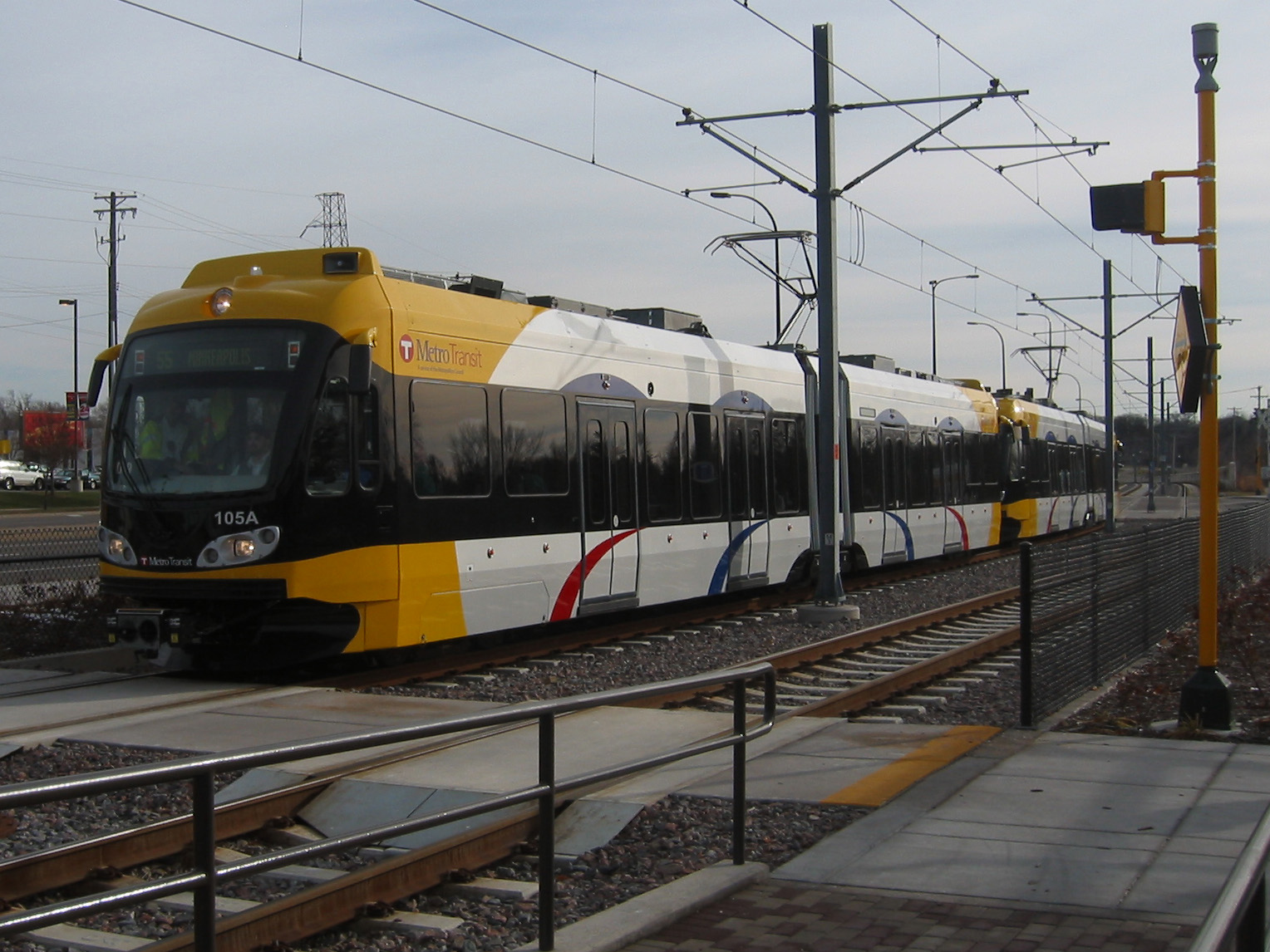
A two-unit Hiawatha Line train approaches 46th Street station from the south in 2005. The black, yellow, and silver livery was standard before the introduction of the Metro system.

=== Background ===
The Minneapolis–St. Paul area once had an extensive network of streetcars (operated for many years by Twin City Rapid Transit, a precursor of Metro Transit), but the tracks were removed and services were eliminated in the 1950s.

Over the years since the last trolley ran in 1954, many people have pushed for the reintroduction of rail transport in the Twin Cities. Proposals for a modern streetcar or light rail along the Hiawatha Avenue corridor appeared in the pages of the Minneapolis Star as early as 1974. The primary reason is that traffic congestion has grown considerably since the streetcar system ceased operation: a 2003 report by the Texas Transportation Institute indicated that the area was the 17th most congested area in the country, with the second fastest congestion growth.

Rail projects struggled to gain political support until the 1990s, when several factors combined to make the idea more palatable. Governor Jesse Ventura and Minnesota Transportation Commissioner Elwyn Tinklenberg heavily promoted the idea of rail transport, and significant amounts of money became available from the federal government. Previous governors had advocated light rail, but had not been able to get legislation passed. Governor Tim Pawlenty had campaigned on a promise to fight the expansion of light rail, but altered his opinions after taking office. He also initially opposed the Northstar Line commuter rail project, which is a rail corridor north of Minneapolis, but changed his mind about that project in January 2004 when a scaled-back version was shown to have good potential.

=== Project development ===
For many, the Hiawatha Avenue corridor was not the top choice for a new project. Popular other options included connecting Minneapolis with the western suburbs, though probably the most-desired option has been the Central Corridor connecting the Twin Cities themselves (Minneapolis and St. Paul) with a route down the middle of Interstate 94 or University Avenue. However, much of the land had already been acquired by the state in the 1960s to build a sunken radial expressway into downtown that was never built. In addition to the available land, the desire to connect to the airport and at least reach the vicinity of the Mall of America proved to be the bigger draw for decision-makers.

The idea of running a rail line down Hiawatha Avenue had already been around for at least a decade by the time the decision was made to go forward. In 1985, the Minnesota Department of Transportation (Mn/DOT) had produced an Environmental Impact Statement that concluded that light rail was the best alternative for the corridor. In 1996, the document was examined again as Mn/DOT looked at the possibility of adding bus rapid transit along the road, but money for light rail became available soon after, leading to the current layout.

=== Construction and opening ===
The line's cost totaled $715.3 million, with $334.3 million coming from the federal government. This is considerably higher than initial budgets predicted—the figure was about $400 million in 1997. Opponents to the rail line state that it went far over-budget, but supporters of the line state that extensions of the route and other alterations, plus the impact of inflation, are the real reasons for the increased cost. Initial designs cut out the last stop in downtown, and the southern end of the line did not quite connect to the Mall of America. The Warehouse District stop was added early but another cost increase came from approximately $40 million to enhance the line (while construction was in progress) to bring the line directly into the Mall of America's transit hub. It was completed later than what was initially hoped for (a lot of literature points to 2003 as the opening year), but the mall connection was a significant contribution to the extra time requirements. These extensions are also why the line was initially reported to be 11.6 miles (18.7 km) long, but ended up being 12 miles (19 km) in length. The Target Field extension in 2009 added a few more tenths to the length. Groundbreaking for the line took place on January 17, 2001.

In March 2004, the labor union representing Metro Transit bus workers went on strike. This delayed the opening of the line from the anticipated start date of April 3, although there was some indication that the opening would have been delayed anyway. Apparently, some of the delay had to do with slow delivery of trainsets from Bombardier. Certain aspects of the design had been tried before, but the cars were the first to combine the factors of conforming to American standards (as opposed to European), having low floors and being built at the company's Mexico plant. Some problems also cropped up during testing of the vehicles, but Bombardier said that the issues were not out of the ordinary.

When the buses began rolling again on April 19, the line's opening was rolled back to June 26. Testing of the track and vehicles continued during the bus strike, as much of the work was performed by Bombardier employees rather than Metro Transit workers. Train operators who had already gone through the training process were given refresher courses when the strike ended. Regular service began on the first phase of the line on June 26, 2004, with the second phase opening later that year on December 4. Each opening was accompanied with two days of free rides on the train and area buses. The line was tested for months before opening, with regular service simulated for about a month before each phase went online. The Hiawatha Line opened exactly 50 years and one week after the last regular-service streetcars ran in the city.

Light rail staff, security, and volunteers produced a largely hitch-free opening day for the new rail system on June 26, 2004. Officials estimated 30,000 people boarded the electric-powered trains during the transit system's first day of service. Train rides were free. Each station featured live entertainment and food as a diversion for the long waits to board the trains. Predicted daily ridership was 19,300 for 2005 and 24,600 for 2020.

=== Developments post-opening ===
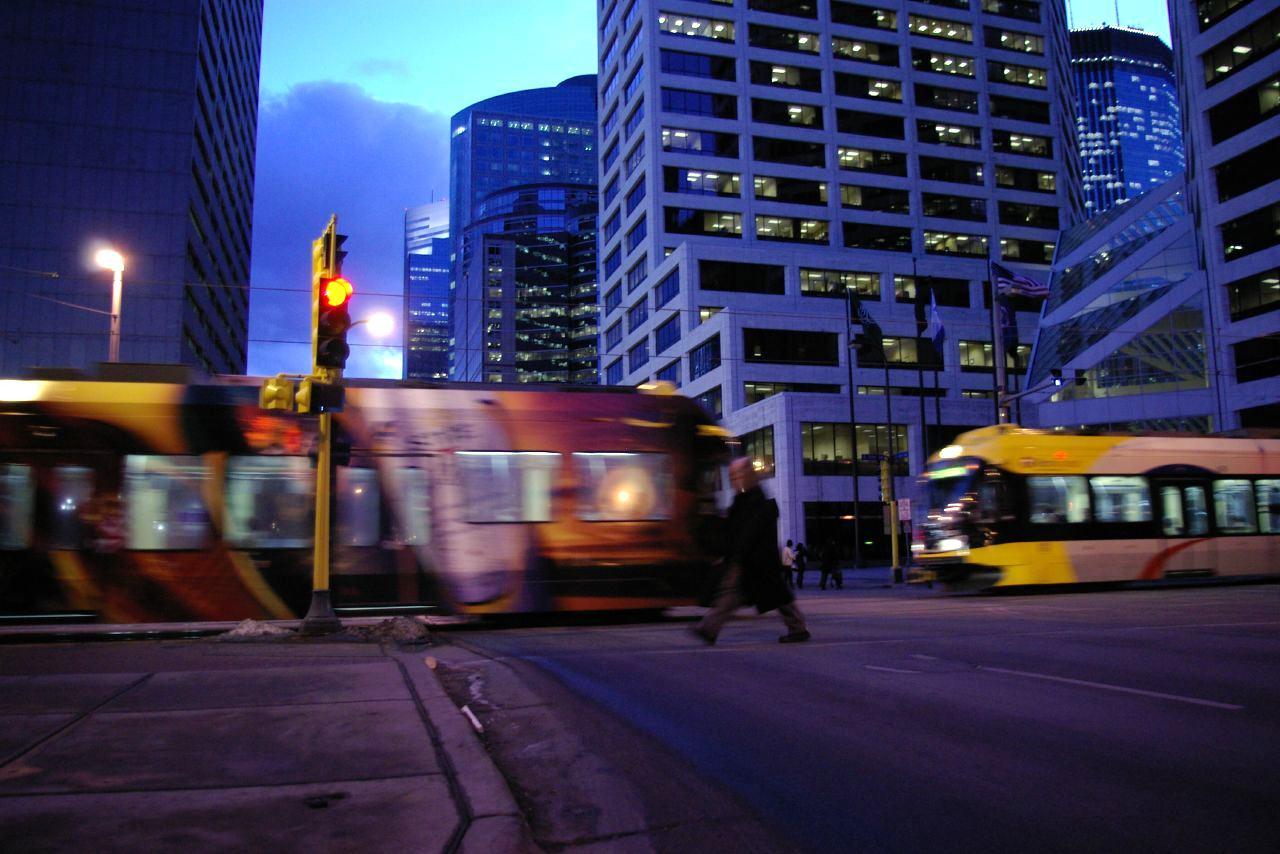
A pedestrian walking next to moving trains

Busways are still being examined for many future projects and it appears likely that at least one will be built. Construction of the area's second light rail line, the Green Line connecting downtown Minneapolis and St. Paul began in late 2010 and opened on June 14, 2014. On April 26, 2011, the U.S. government announced $478 million in funding for its construction.

During Super Bowl LII on February 4, 2018, hosted at U.S. Bank Stadium, the Blue Line was restricted to ticketholders and ran with non-stop service between a security checkpoint at the Mall of America and the stadium station. Service at other stations was replaced with free shuttle buses.

In July 2011, the Metropolitan Council officially approved renaming the Hiawatha Line as the Blue Line. This is part of a broader color scheme for identifying Twin Cities transit lines, including the Green Line light rail to St. Paul, the Orange Line bus rapid transit along I-35W, and the operational Red Line bus rapid transit service along Cedar Avenue. The name officially changed on Friday, May 17, 2013.

Starting July 8, 2022, in a planned 5 week project, the Blue line shut down 5 stops from Mall of America to Airport Terminal 2 for the 'Largest construction project in the light rail line's history.' According to Metro Transit, the project consists of replacing sections of tracks that "have worn out and upgrades technology that guides safety systems."

In addition, the updates will also bring safety enhancements and allow trains to switch tracks and turn around near the 30th Avenue Station, which will provide more opportunity to keep trains moving if a section of track is taken out of service. Ryan Heath, engineer for Metro Transit who is overseeing the project, said that "this is important for the Blue Line's next 40 years. We're looking out literally decades with an eye toward improving the reliability and maintainability of our system."

=== Proposed extension ===
An extension of the line to Brooklyn Park is planned. On August 3, 2020, after years of disagreements with The Burlington Northern Santa Fe (BNSF) Railway Company regarding use of BNSF's right-of-way, Metropolitan Council announced they would begin to "explore opportunities to advance this critical project without using BNSF Railway right of way." Current plans call for the Blue Line Extension to run east from Target Field to Washington Avenue, then through north Minneapolis via 21st Avenue, West Broadway Avenue, and Bottineau Boulevard, until it meets the originally planned route near 73rd Avenue and West Broadway.

== Route ==
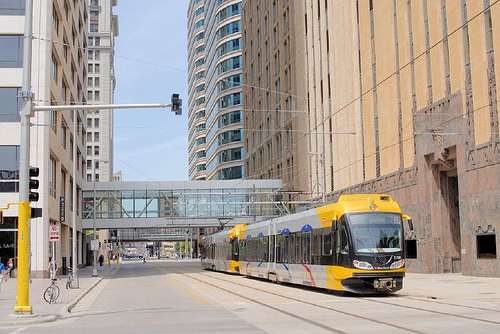
Light rail spine along 5th Street downtown, shared by the Green Line.

The Blue Line runs from downtown Minneapolis to the Mall of America for a length of 12 mi (19.3 km). The southern terminus at the Mall of America station and transit center is located beneath the east parking ramp of the mall and has direct access to the mall. The station offers connections to the Red Line and other local bus routes including those operated by Minnesota Valley Transit Authority. From the Mall of America trains travel east towards the 28th Avenue station park-and-ride ramp. The route travels through Bloomington's South Loop District before reaching the Terminal 2–Humphrey station of the MSP Airport across from Fort Snelling National Cemetery. To cross the MSP Airport the line then enters a pair of 7,300 feet (2,200 m) tunnels that required a tunnel boring machine and cost $110 million to construct. While traveling through the tunnels, trains stop at the 65 feet (20 m) underground Terminal 1–Lindbergh station. Once emerging from the tunnel, the line serves two park-and-ride lots at Fort Snelling station. From Fort Snelling station, the line travels on the surface in separated right of way parallel to Minnesota State Highway 55 while stopping at stations near the VA Medical center, Minnehaha Park, and other locations in south Minneapolis. Trains travel on bridges over traffic at busy intersections near Lake Street and Franklin Ave with overhead stations located at each crossing.

After crossing to the other side of Highway 55, the line runs on the former Chicago, Milwaukee, St. Paul & Pacific Short Line roadbed which brought Hiawatha passenger trains to the downtown depot. After crossing I-35W on a dedicated bridge, the train begins to share tracks with the Green Line and enters downtown by traveling around U.S. Bank Stadium. The U.S. Bank Stadium station is surrounded by a pedestrian plaza that is used for loading riders onto trains after events at US Bank Stadium. While passing the Downtown East Commons, the route travels through downtown on surface streets. The line shares the road with one lane of automobile traffic through downtown with the exception of the block along Government Plaza station where the street is closed and a pedestrian plaza connecting the Minneapolis City Hall and the Hennepin County Government Center. With a stop at Nicollet Mall the line offers connections to an important transit and pedestrian corridor. The train terminates at Target Field station.

Metro Blue Line interactive map

=== Stations ===
Line	Type
Target Field – Union Depot	Light rail
Downtown Minneapolis – Burnsville Heart of the City	BRT
Mall of America – Apple Valley	BRT
46th Street – Rosedale Transit Center	BRT
Downtown Minneapolis – Brooklyn Center Transit Center	BRT
Mall of America – Brooklyn Center Transit Center	BRT

Station/Stop	Line	Transfer	Opened	Daily Ridership (2025)	Grade
Target Field	Alt text	Alt text	2009	1,725	Elevated
Warehouse District/Hennepin Avenue	Alt text		2004	1,312	At-grade
Nicollet Mall	Alt text	Alt text	2004	2,500	At-grade
Government Plaza	Alt text		2004	1,333	At-grade
U.S. Bank Stadium	Alt text		2004	2,513	At-grade
Cedar–Riverside	Alt text		2004	549	At-grade
Franklin Avenue	Alt text		2004	1,101	At-grade
Lake Street/Midtown	Alt text		2004	1,347	Elevated
38th Street	Alt text		2004	768	At-grade
46th Street	Alt text	Alt text	2004	1,185	At-grade
50th Street/Minnehaha Park	Alt text		2004	300	At-grade
VA Medical Center	Alt text		2004	450	At-grade
Fort Snelling	Alt text		2004	443	At-grade
Terminal 1–Lindbergh	Alt text		2004	1,791	Underground
Terminal 2–Humphrey	Alt text		2004	1,607	At-grade, under parking deck
American Boulevard	Alt text		2009	234	At-grade
Bloomington Central	Alt text		2004	212	At-grade
30th Avenue	Alt text		2004	280	At-grade
Mall of America	Alt text	Alt text	1994	1,845	At-grade, under parking deck

Each of the 19 stations along the route is designed in a unique architectural style reflective of the station's surrounding community. This is not an entirely new idea for the region, as many of the higher-traffic bus stops around the city have distinctive designs. Due to the unique makeup of Minneapolis' population, ticket-dispensing machines present instructions in four languages: English, Spanish, Somali and Hmong. Travel time is roughly two to three minutes between most stations.

The airport used to operate a bus shuttle between the two terminals, but the light-rail line has replaced that service. No fare is required to ride between the two airport stations and trains run between these stations 24 hours a day, 7 days a week. Only seven of the original 17 stations was built to accommodate three car trains, but due to the need to increase the line's capacity, the remaining stations were retrofitted or extended to accommodate three-car trains in 2009. The extensions were paid for primarily with federal money but the Metropolitan Council, Hennepin County, and city of Bloomington also contributed some funds.

=== Station additions ===
The Blue Line was extended several blocks northwest from the Warehouse District/Hennepin Avenue station to the Target Field Station in 2009. The station was paid for by the Minnesota Twins as part of the construction and opening of Target Field. The two-level station has light rail platforms on the upper level for use by Blue Line and Green Line light rail trains, and platforms next to the BNSF mainline tracks passing beneath the station served the Northstar Commuter Rail Line until the line closed in early 2026. The under construction Green Line extension, known as the Metro Green Line Extension, will connect directly to the end of the Blue Line to share service with the station.

Largely federal money but also with some local contributions was secured for construction of the new American Boulevard Station in Bloomington between the Humphrey Terminal Station and Bloomington Central Station. This station was included in the line's original plans, but was postponed due to cost overruns. Because much of the necessary underground infrastructure for the station was installed when the line was constructed, the station was built with minimal service interruptions.

== Service ==
A 2007 Metro Transit Ticket, valid for 2½ hours after purchase.

Passengers who ride the rail system are charged the same fare as they would pay for the local Metro Transit bus system, and they are able to use their bus transfer cards to switch between the two different modes of transportation without making another payment. A new payment system using smart cards (locally known as Go-To Cards) was initially expected to be introduced along with the rail line in June 2004, but software bugs delayed introduction. By September 2006, the bugs were worked out and the Go-To Cards became operational.

In basic service trains operate every 10 to 15 minutes and operate less frequently in the early morning and late-night. Additional trains operate on Friday and Saturday nights. The line shuts down for about four hours each night, except for a shuttle service between the two terminals at the MSP airport which run 24 hours a day. Vehicles have a capacity of 66 seated passengers and 120 standing. Currently two or three vehicles are run together to increase capacity.

=== Ridership ===
The line accounts for about 13% of Metro Transit's total ridership. Less than two years after opening, the line had already exceeded its 2020 weekday ridership goal of 24,800. The line carried 10.6 million riders in 2015. In 2018 weekday ridership on the Blue Line was 32,921. Ridership for both the Green and Blue Lines combined was down 59% in 2020 due to the effects of the COVID-19 pandemic. Ridership had begun to recover in 2023, but average weekday ridership remained below 20,000

=== Fares ===
The Blue Line uses a proof-of-payment system, requiring riders to carry tickets at all times. Fares are purchased before boarding, either at ticket machines located in the stations or by scanning a Go-To card at dedicated pedestals. Tickets are valid for 2 1/2 hours after purchase, with transfers available to other Metro lines as well as any Metro Transit bus routes. Fares can range from 50¢ within the two Downtown Zones of Minneapolis and St. Paul to $2 for adults.

== Rolling stock ==
The Blue Line uses 27 Bombardier Flexity Swift light rail vehicles (LRVs) and 12 Siemens S70 LRVs. The system is designed to operate on 750 volts DC. Trains can reach speeds of 55 miles per hour (88.5 km/h), but the "general service speed" is about 40 mph (64.4 km/h) or slower (especially in the congested downtown region). They are of a 70% low-floor design, meaning that 70 percent of the floor inside is within about 14 inches (356 mm) of the ground. This is the same height as the rail platforms, allowing stepless access for passengers dependent on wheelchairs or other mobility aids. The feature also makes it easier for passengers with bicycles or strollers to board the train. Each vehicle weighs about 107,000 pounds (48,534 kg) when empty. Minneapolis is the first and only city to use this LRV model in the United States.

Vehicles have a color scheme that is primarily a combination of blue, yellow, and white. Yellow was the color used on the previous streetcar system in the area. Each vehicle has an A, B and C section: The A and B sections are the large portions on each end, while the C section is a small portion that connects the two other pieces and has the vehicle's middle truck or bogie. Electricity is collected by a pantograph mounted on the B section. The first "Type I" LRV was delivered on March 19, 2003. 14 of 15 delivered vehicles were operational for the opening weekend. The initial order was eventually bumped up to a full 24 vehicles, which were operational by early 2005. Three additional vehicles were ordered in the winter of 2006/2007, using leftover funds from the construction budget for one vehicle and Hennepin County funds for the other two.

The noses of these vehicles are built to a different design than is standard for the Flexity Swift, containing a small scoop-shaped area. This assists in the removal of snow, but the anticipated snow-management method is merely to run trains on a frequent basis rather than actually using snow removal equipment (this was what the earlier streetcar system usually did to keep lines clear, though they also often featured small scrapers in front of the lead wheels).

Each vehicle has a number of cameras on board, pointing both inward and outward, to monitor passenger activity and other areas of interest for security and safety. Train stations also have cameras. Video feeds and the position of each vehicle on the line are monitored in a control room at the system's maintenance facility, located between Cedar-Riverside and Franklin Avenue stations.

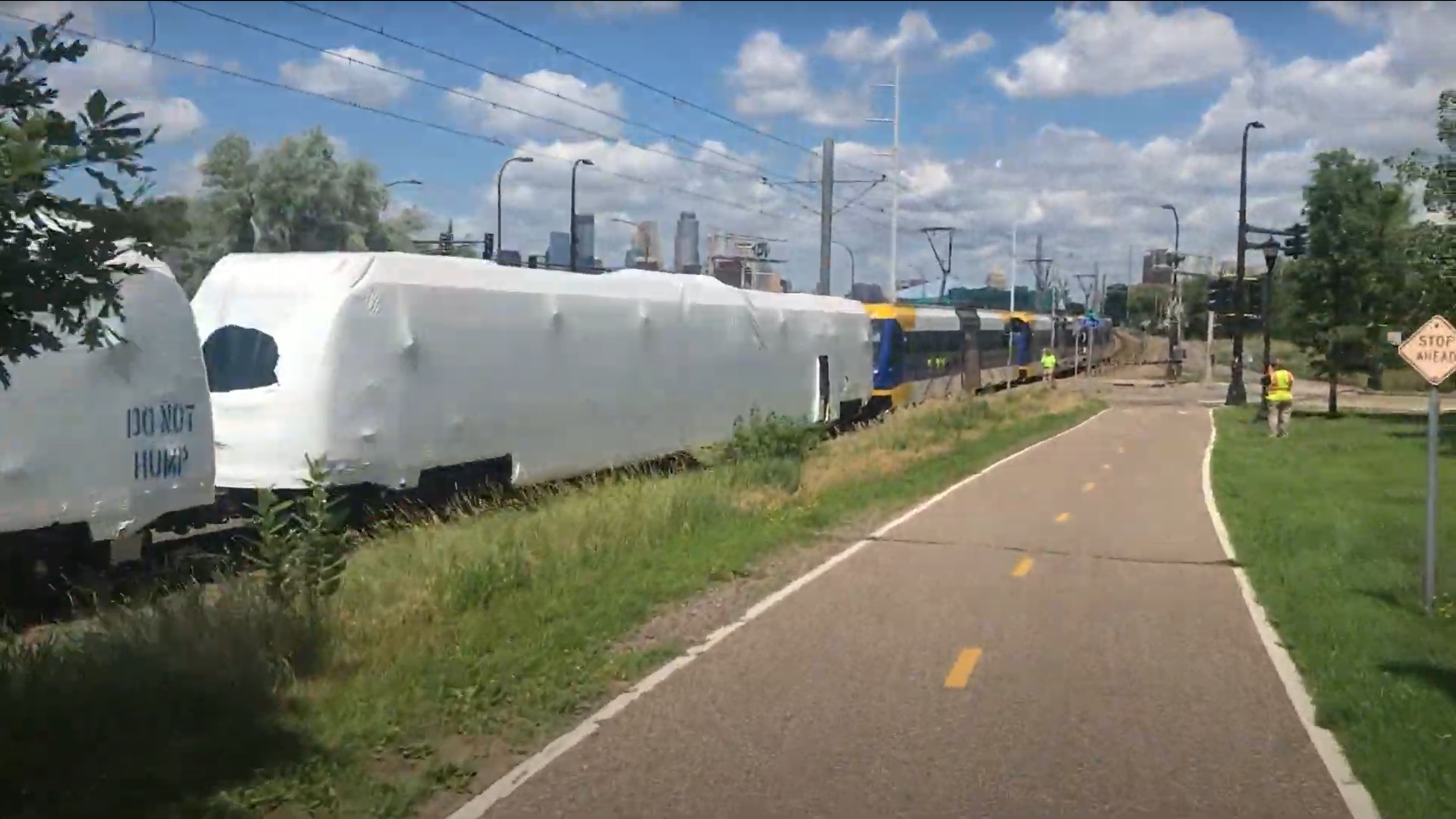
Two Type III LRVs coupled to three existing vehicles while being delivered.

According to Metropolitan Council meeting notes dated July 30, 2010, for the August 9 Transportation Committee meeting, Siemens Industry Incorporated agreed to build the Light Rail Vehicles for the three-car train expansion project in a joint procurement with the Green Line's initial LRV procurement, at a per-LRV cost of $3,297,714 and a total contract value of $153,211,516. According to Mark Fuhrmann's presentation at the July 26, 2010, Transportation Committee meeting, these "Type II" LRVs are mechanically, but not electronically, compatible with the current fleet of 27 "type I" vehicles, so while the two generations are able to run at the same time and either type would be able to push a malfunctioning unit of the other type, multiple-unit trains can only be assembled of one type. The Metro Blue Line uses 12 "Type II" S70 LRVs.

== Safety ==
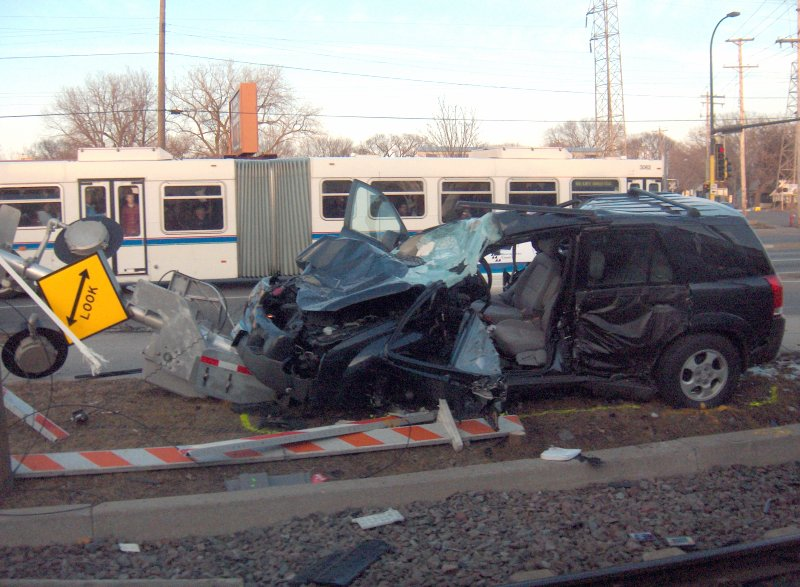
Aftermath of a non-fatal crash

With an expansion of the light rail system happening with the opening of the Green Line in 2014, Metro Transit rolled out a new rail safety campaign, with representatives of Metro Transit customers visiting schools and organizations situated near the Blue Line to discuss rail safety. The campaign won a visual design award from the Minnesota Association of Government Communicators. By January 2015, there had been 11 deaths from crashes on the line, eight of them pedestrians. After two more people were killed in separate incidents on the Blue Line, one a bicyclist and one a man in a wheelchair, signs saying "See Tracks? Think Train" were added at locations of recent deaths along the Blue Line and Green Line. As of September 2019, 15 people have died in crashes with Blue Line trains.

Additionally, there has been concern over violent assaults, robberies, and disorderly conduct that occurs on the station platforms while people wait for the trains. There was a murder by stabbing at the Lake Street/Midtown station in December 2014. Aggravated assaults, which involve the use of a weapon to cause serious injury, continued to increase through 2019 including another murder by stabbing at the Lake Street/Midtown station in October 2017. Increased police officer hours, including the use of plainclothes police officers, were added to address safety concerns in 2019. Other efforts included allowing riders to text a number to communicate with police and teams dedicated to helping homeless riders were added in the same year. In January 2020, the Met Council approved $1.3 million in spending to install new 360-degree 4K resolution cameras on all Metro Transit light rail cars by the end of 2020. Another stabbing that resulted in death occurred on a train in Bloomington in January 2020, but no charges were filed due to claims of self-defense.

== See also ==
- Hiawatha LRT Trail
- Metro Green Line (Minnesota)
