= American Boulevard station =

Light rail station in Bloomington, Minnesota, U.S.

American Boulevard
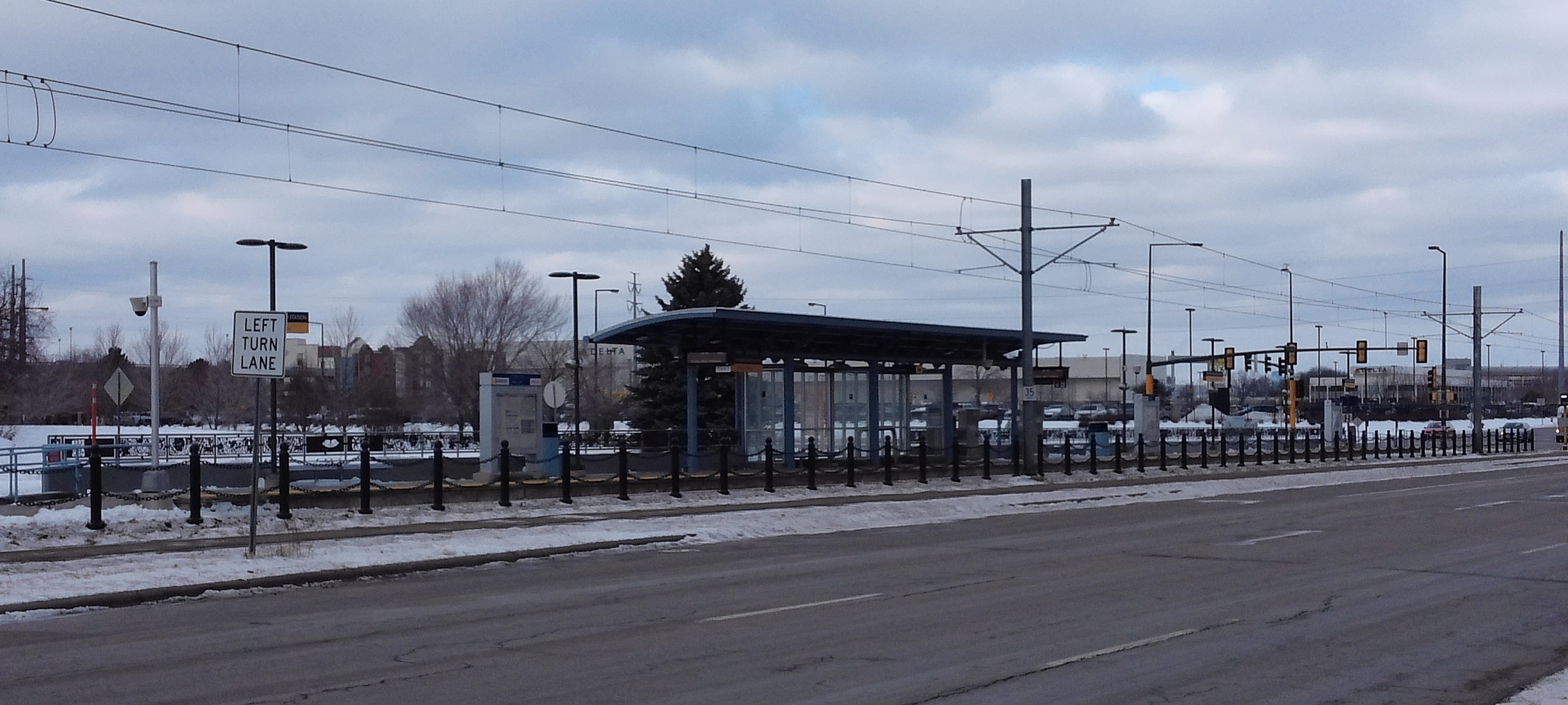
- Station platform in 2015

General information
- Location: 34th Avenue South & East American Boulevard; Bloomington, Minnesota
- Coordinates: 44°51′31″N 93°13′23″W
- Owner: Metro Transit
- Platforms: 2 split side platforms
- Tracks: 2

Construction
- Structure type: At-grade
- Accessible: Yes

History
- Opened: December 12, 2009

Passengers
- 2025: 234 daily ▲10.9%
- Rank: 36 out of 37

Services
Preceding station	Metro	Following station
Bloomington Central toward Mall of America	Blue Line	Terminal 2–Humphrey toward Target Field
Location

American Boulevard is a light rail station in Bloomington, Minnesota at the intersection of 34th Avenue South and American Boulevard, just south of Interstate 494. It is the only station on the Blue Line to have a split design where the northbound platform is on the opposite end of the intersection from the southbound platform. It is an infill station, that was built after the rest of the line had been completed. It was included in the original plans for the Blue Line, but was shelved when extra costs incurred caused plans for the Mall of America station to change. The station had a dedication ceremony for construction workers on December 9, 2009 and opened on December 12, 2009.
