= Mall of America station =

Light rail and bus station in Bloomington, Minnesota

Mall of America
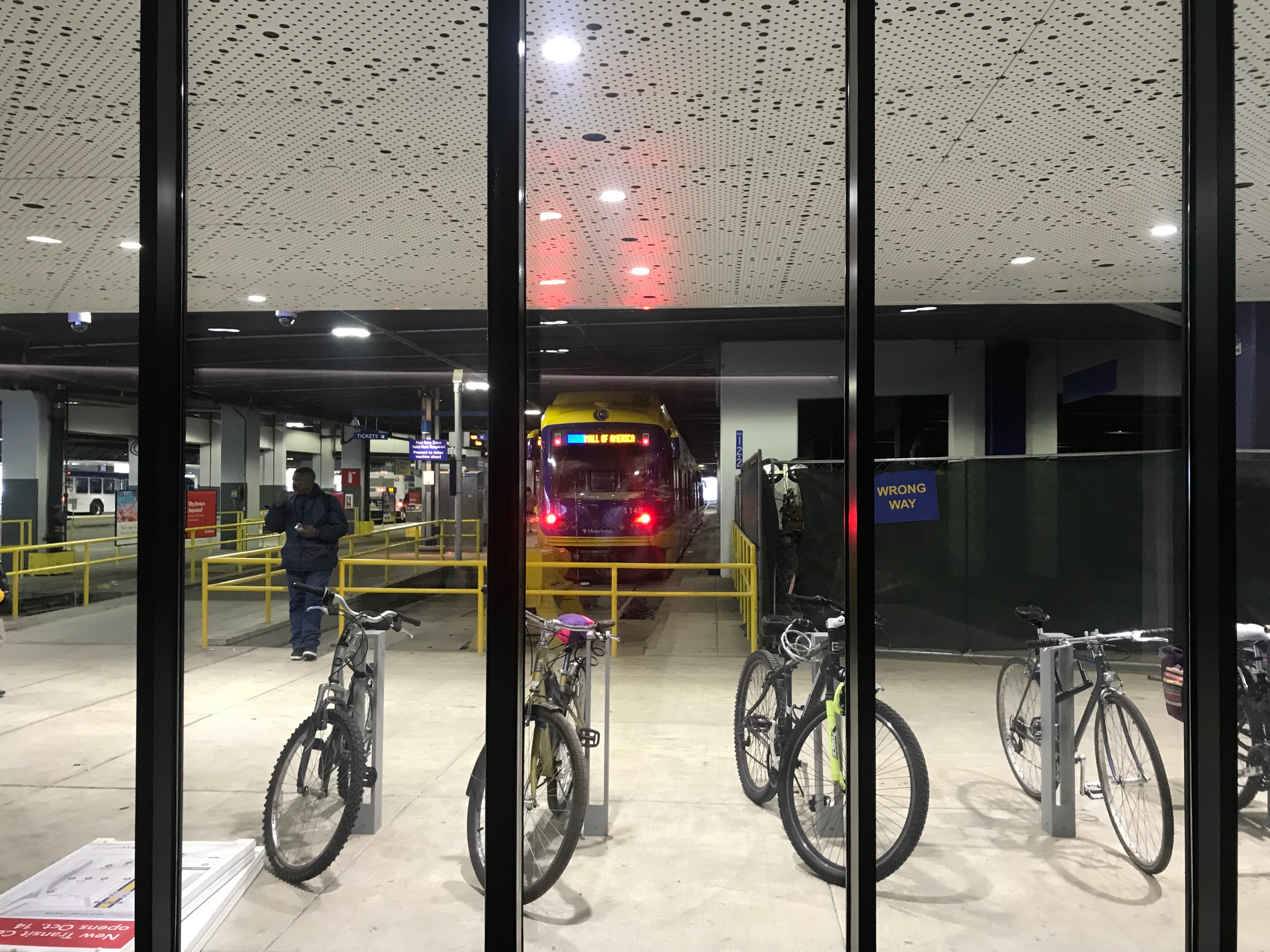
- The light rail platform from the waiting area.

General information
- Location: 8240 24th Avenue South; Bloomington, Minnesota
- Coordinates: 44°51′15″N 93°14′20″W
- Owner: Metro Transit
- Platforms: 1 island platform
- Tracks: 2
- Connections: Metro Transit: 54, 515, 538, 539, 540, 542; MVTA: 444, 495; SouthWest Transit: 686

Construction
- Structure type: At-grade, under parking deck
- Accessible: Yes

History
- Opened: 1994
- Rebuilt: 2004, 2013, 2019

Passengers
- 2025: 1,845 daily ▲3% (LRT)
- Rank: 4 out of 37
- 2025: 1,346 daily (BRT)
- Rank: 4 out of 129

Services
Preceding station	Metro	Following station
Terminus	Blue Line	30th Avenue toward Target Field
Terminus	Red Line	Cedar Grove toward Apple Valley
American & Thunderbird toward Brooklyn Center	D Line	Terminus
Location

The Mall of America station is the busiest transit center in Minnesota, with bus and light rail service linking the Mall of America to many destinations in the Minneapolis–St. Paul metro. Public transit service is provided by Metro Transit and the Minnesota Valley Transit Authority. The station is served by Metro Blue Line, Red Line, and D Line. The station previously hosted private shuttle services to hotels and Mystic Lake Casino until those services moved to a new charter bus terminal on the north side of the mall in 2015.

A $25 million upgrade to the station was completed October 14, 2019 with an official ribbon-cutting ceremony February 14, 2020.

== Location and design ==
The transit center first opened in 1994 along with the Mall of America and only provided bus service. During this period, gangs would congregate at the transit center after mall close. The mall asked Metro Transit pull bus service, to which they refused. As an alternative, the mall required teenagers to be accompanied by adults, a policy that is still in place.

Original plans for light rail service had the station and a 200-space park and ride lot located across 24th Avenue, with a skyway through the parking ramp to access the bus terminal and mall. Mall management tried to keep the light rail station off their property, with a representative stating, "LRT needs the mall more than the mall needs LRT". However, in June 2003, intervention from the Federal Transit Administration and $39.9 million in additional funding for the project allowed the alignment to extend south and enter into the transit center, providing direct access to buses. The park and ride facility was moved to a new station at 30th Avenue using funds for the American Boulevard station, which would then be constructed at a later date.

Bus and train platforms are located on the ground floor of the east parking ramp of the mall. When the station first opened until the 2019 renovation, passengers were required to walk outside and cross the mall's ring road to enter the mall. The new transit station brings passengers directly into the mall, crossing under the road in a new tunnel.

The original transit center had a utilitarian design with basic finishes. Met Council member Steve Elkins said in a council meeting, "It's just dark and dank, and not really safe or inviting".

== Metro service ==
The mall is the southern terminus of the Metro Blue Line (LRT), D Line (BRT) and the northern terminus of the Metro Red Line (BRT). The Blue Line connects the mall to the Minneapolis–Saint Paul International Airport and downtown Minneapolis via Hiawatha Avenue. The Red Line connects the mall to Eagan and Apple Valley via Cedar Avenue. The D Line connects the mall to Brooklyn Center via downtown Minneapolis. Light rail service began December 4, 2004 and BRT service began June 22, 2013. The 2019 renovation added station infrastructure for the D Line and allocated space for an additional train platform for potential future use.

== Commuter traffic ==
The mall is not a park and ride facility. Overnight parking at the mall is banned to prevent passengers from parking for free and taking the train to the airport. Commuters are required to park at the free ramp at 30th Avenue Station 1/3 mile (540 m) east of the mall.

== 2019 renovation ==
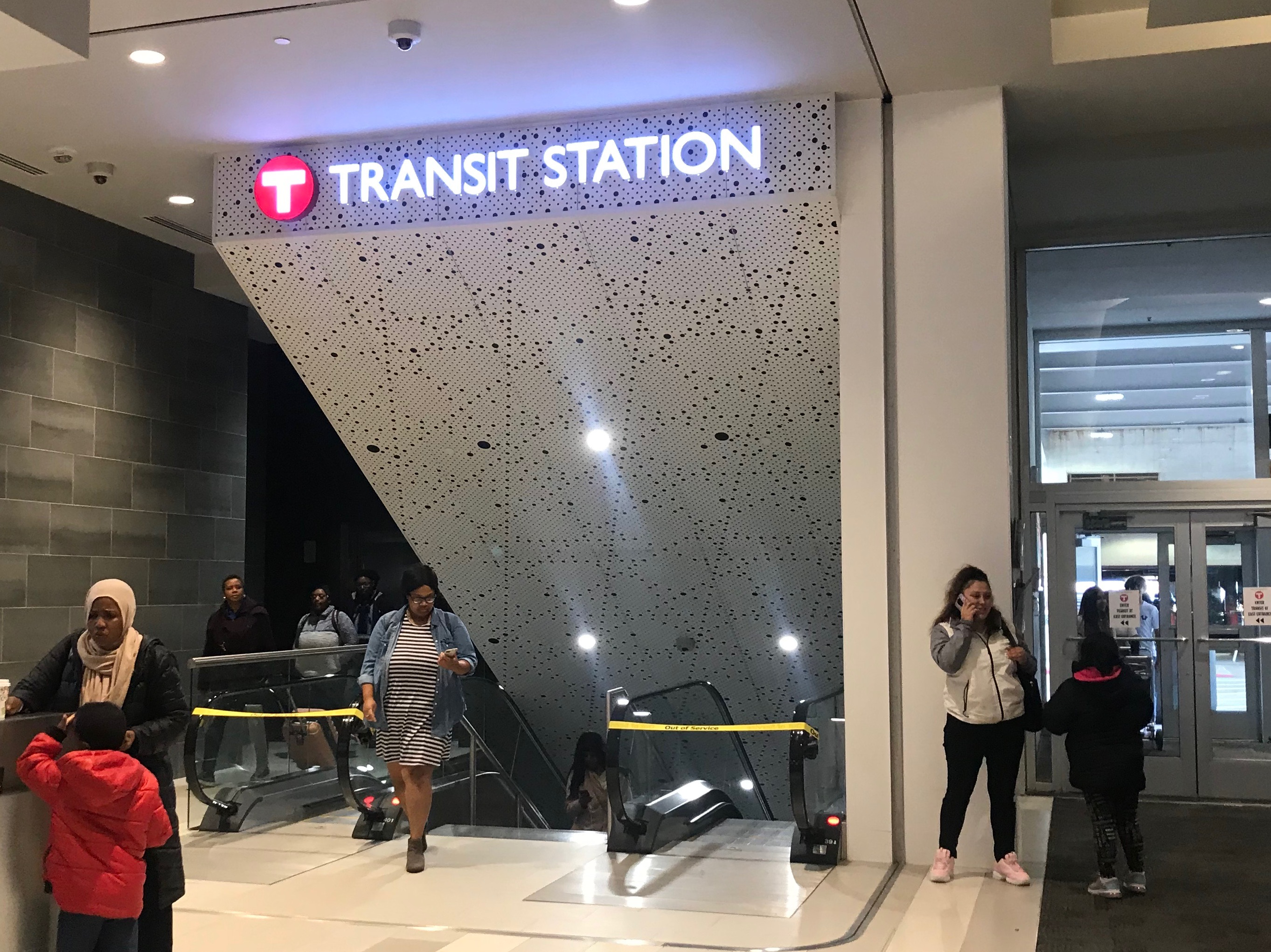
The mall entrance to the waiting area and platforms. Prior to the renovation, passengers were required to walk outside through the doors on the right to access the station.

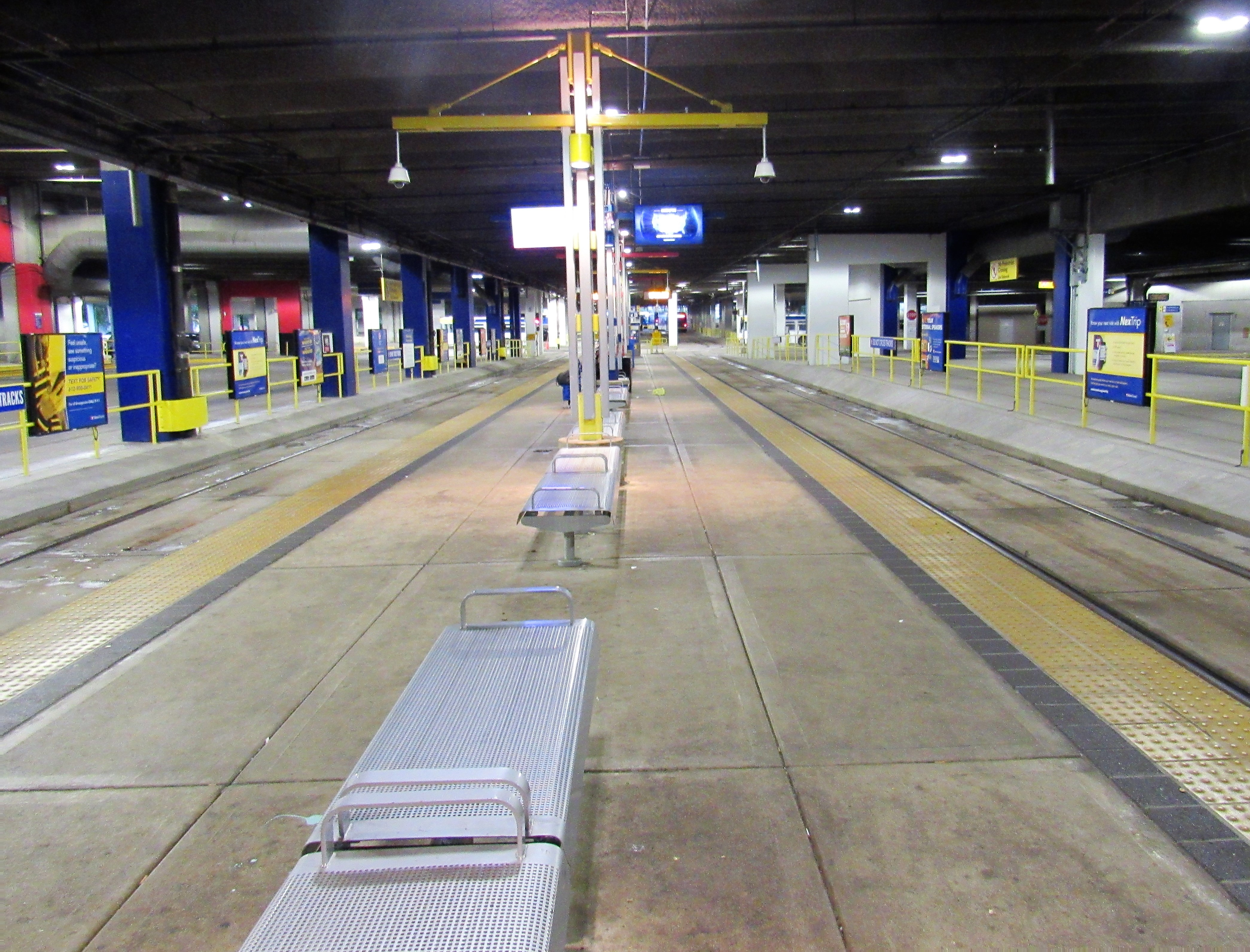
The light rail platform in 2018.

The Mall of America Transit Station has undergone reconstruction to increase efficiency and capacities, and to provide a better experience for its users. Previously, buses and delivery trucks shared an entrance checkpoint. The checkpoint was a cause of delay, as delivery vehicles had to be inspected by security before preceding. Delivery vehicles also needed to cross the LRT tracks to proceed to loading docks, resulting in additional backups. Due to the reduced speed of trains, it could take 70 seconds to 140 seconds for trains to clear the crossing. Additionally, buses had to cross over LRT tracks when departing the station.

A Minnesota Senate publication during the 2015–2016 legislative session called the station functionally obsolete. The station had no external signage or identification and renderings published by the Minnesota Senate showed a visual presence of the station from the street. The proposal improved station amenities, its aesthetic appeal and the visitor experience. The upgrade also would provide clear and convenient pedestrian access. The improvements also enabled buses to enter the station more seamlessly, eliminated LRT track crossings and separated the entrance checkpoint from delivery vehicles.

The upgrade costs were approximately $25 million. The project was funded by $8.75 million in state bonds, $7 million from the federal government, $5 million from Bloomington, $2.25 from Counties Transit Improvement Board and $2 million from Metro Transit. Neither the Mall of America or the Minnesota Valley Transit Authority contributed funds toward the renovation. The new waiting area, entrance and bus terminal opened October 14, 2019, with final upgrades finished in November. The new transit station was officially dedicated Friday February 14, 2020.
