= Target Field station =

Light rail station in Minneapolis, Minnesota

Target Field
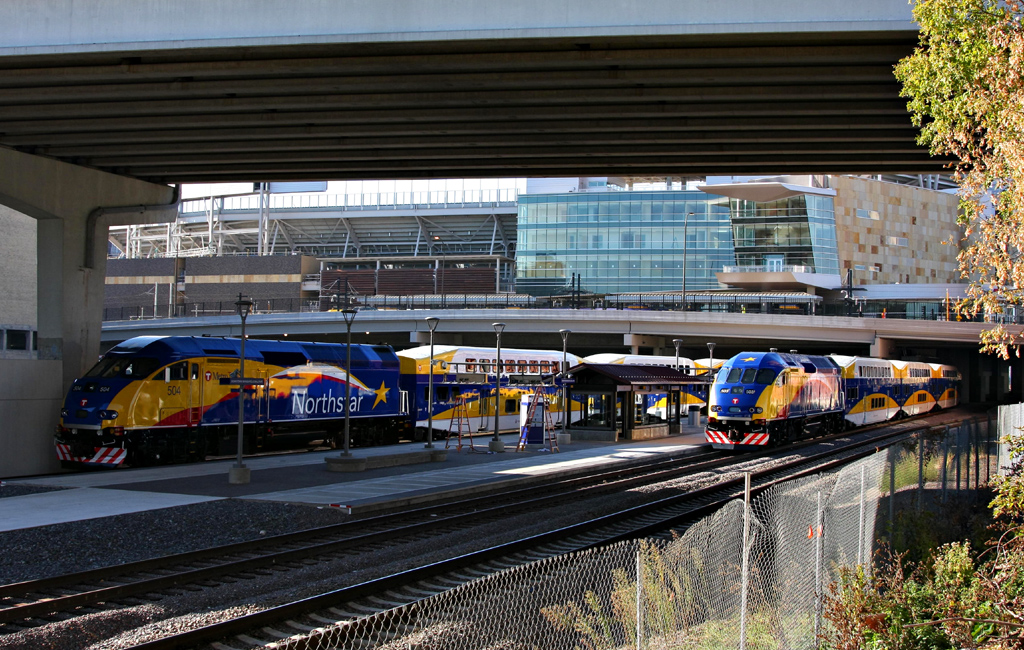
- Northstar Line trains at Target Field station in 2009.

General information
- Location: 5th Street & 3rd Avenue North; Minneapolis, Minnesota
- Coordinates: 44°59′00″N 93°16′38″W
- Owner: Metro Transit
- Platforms: 1 island platform (platform 1); 2 side platforms (platform 2)
- Tracks: 2
- Connections: C; D; Metro Transit: 9, 14, 22, 94

Construction
- Structure type: Elevated
- Accessible: Yes

Other information
- Fare zone: Downtown

History
- Opened: November 14, 2009
- Rebuilt: 2014
- Former names: Downtown Minneapolis/Ballpark (pre-opening)

Passengers
- 2025: 1,725 daily ▼0.2% (Light Rail)
- Rank: 6 out of 37

Services
Preceding station	Metro	Following station
Terminus	Blue Line	Warehouse District/Hennepin Avenue toward Mall of America
Terminus	Green Line	Warehouse District/Hennepin Avenue toward Saint Paul Union Depot
Proposed and future services
Preceding station	Metro	Following station
Future service
Royalston Avenue/Farmers Market toward SouthWest Station	Green Line Extension	through to Green Line
Proposed
Plymouth Avenue toward Oak Grove Parkway	Blue Line Extension	through to Blue Line
Preceding station	Amtrak	Following station
Coon Rapids–Foley Boulevard toward Duluth	Northern Lights Express	Terminus
Terminus	Borealis	St. Paul toward Chicago
Former services
Preceding station	Metro Transit	Following station
Fridley toward Big Lake	Northstar Line	Terminus
Location

Target Field station (formerly known during construction under the names of Minneapolis Intermodal Station, Downtown Minneapolis/Ballpark Station, and The Interchange) is a light rail station in Minneapolis, Minnesota. Located in the North Loop area of Downtown Minneapolis, the station is named for Target Field, the Minnesota Twins baseball stadium. METRO Blue Line light rail service started on November 14, 2009; METRO Green Line light rail service started on June 14, 2014.

== Layout ==
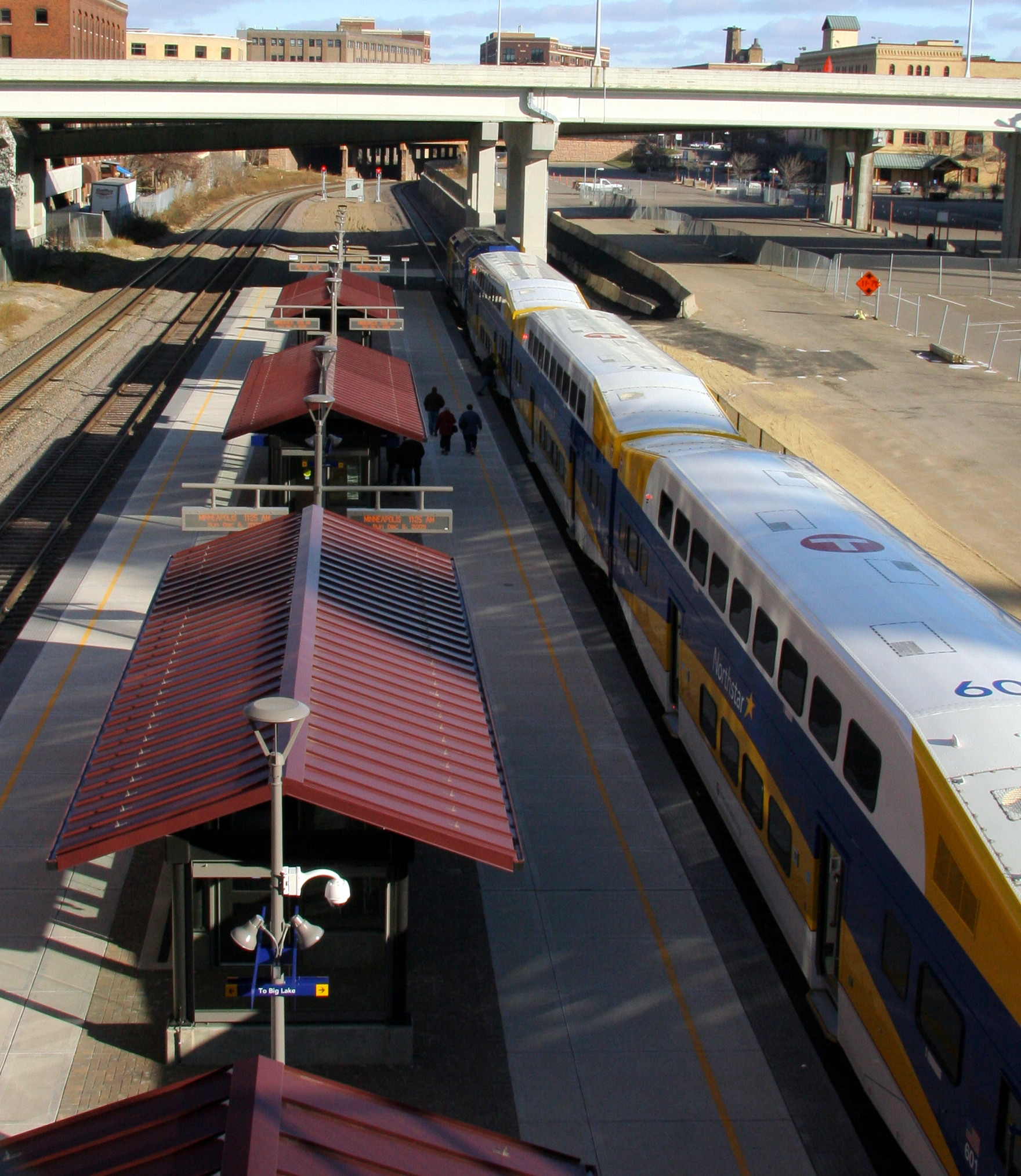
A down on the Northstar Line platform.

The station adjoins Target Field. The station has two sets of light rail island platforms. The original, Platform 1, opened in 2009 with the extension, Platform 2, opened in 2014.

The original light rail platform runs perpendicular over the BNSF Wayzata Subdivision, parallel to the 5th Street North bridge. Platform 2 was built northwest of the Platform 1, approximately 100 feet (30 m) apart.

== History ==
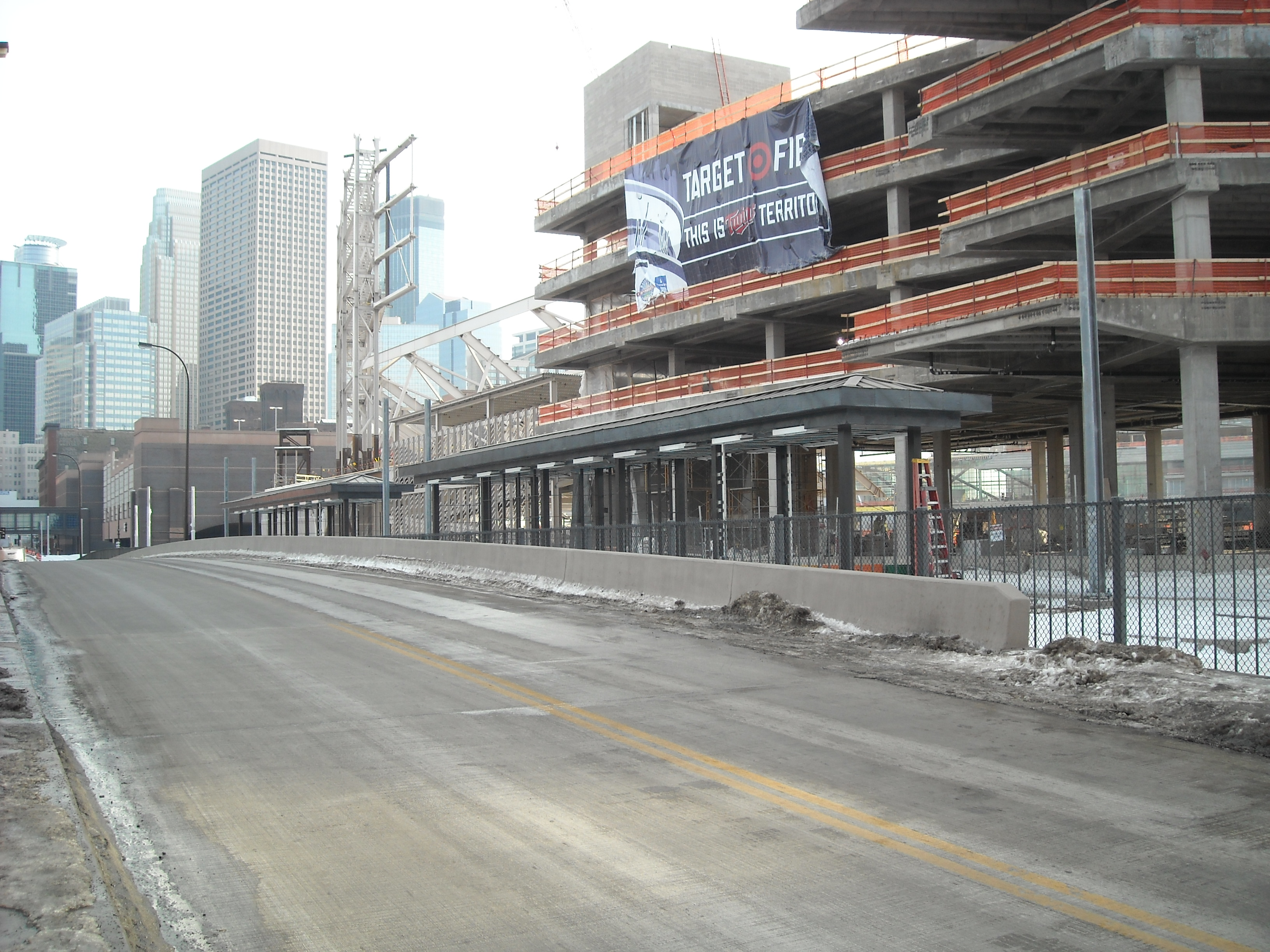
First pair of side platforms for light rail under construction.

The first railroad tracks in Minneapolis on the west bank of the Mississippi were placed in this location by the St. Paul and Pacific Railroad which later became the Great Northern Railway. The Minneapolis and St. Louis Railway and Great Northern Railway laid parallel east/west tracks in this location platted as Dakota Avenue/4th Avenue between 3rd Street North and 5th Street North. The Minneapolis and St. Louis Track was the southern track, and the Great Northern track was the northern track. This grade separation was agreed upon in 1890 after much litigation. The rail bed was lowered to form what is known as "The Cut" below the street grade today.

The station is near the sites of other former Minneapolis railroad depots. The first rail depot in downtown Minneapolis, for the St. Paul and Pacific, was located east near the present-day Fourth Street along the same tracks. The Minneapolis and St. Louis railway freight and passenger depots were located at the East side of Washington Avenue, also east of the present Target Field station. The Electric Short Line Railway (Luce Line) depot was located at the northwest corner of 7th St. North and 3rd Avenue North. It was shared with the Minneapolis, St. Paul, Rochester and Dubuque Electric Traction Company (known as the Dan Patch Line and later the Minneapolis, Northfield and Southern Railway), as well as the Minneapolis, Anoka and Cuyuna Range Interurban railway.

The last passenger rail station to operate in Minneapolis was the Minneapolis Great Northern Depot, which was served by Amtrak until 1978.

=== 2009 station ===
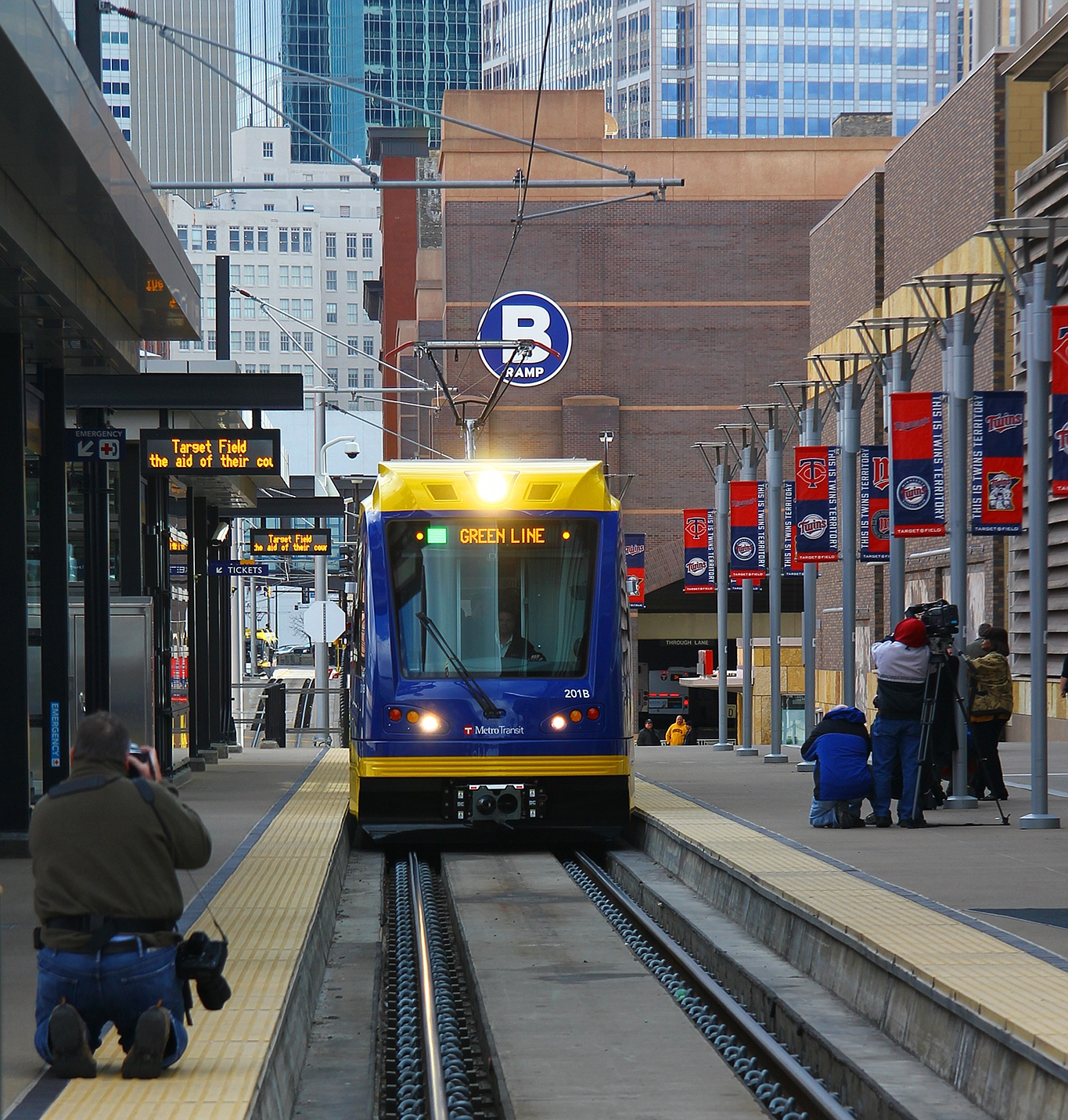
Metro Transit's first new Siemens S70, #201, arrives at a 2012 unveiling to the news media at the 2009 platforms at Target Field station. It bears Green Line signage, though this was months before the Green Line opened.

The station was opened in 2009 to serve the Northstar Line and the Hiawatha Line, now METRO Blue Line. The light rail line was extended from its existing terminus at Warehouse District / Hennepin Avenue to serve the new station. This was the first time for Minneapolis regaining access to passenger rail for 31 years. The Northstar Line was terminated on January 4, 2026.

The Minnesota Twins pledged $2.6 million for its construction.

=== 2014 addition ===
The 2014 addition was designed by New York-based Perkins Eastman, to provide additional platform space for both METRO Green and Blue Lines, as well as provide community gathering space. The additional platform is referred to as Platform 2, while the original platform became Platform 1.

== Future plans ==
The Green Line extension to Eden Prairie and the Blue Line extension to Brooklyn Park will serve Target Field. The Northern Lights Express to Duluth would originate at Target Field.

Potential regional rail routes from Target Field station include the Dakota Rail Corridor to Hutchinson, the Dan Patch Corridor to Northfield, the Little Crow Line to Willmar, the Red Rock Corridor to Hastings, and the Minnesota Prairie Line to Norwood Young America.

An extension of Amtrak's Borealis to Target Field Station from Saint Paul Union Depot is also proposed.

== Operation ==
Light rail trains serve both Platforms 1 and 2. Each train stops twice at the station to serve each platform.

== Recognition ==
Target Field Station won a 2015 Institute Honor Award for Regional and Urban Design by the American Institute of Architects.

== Additional photos ==
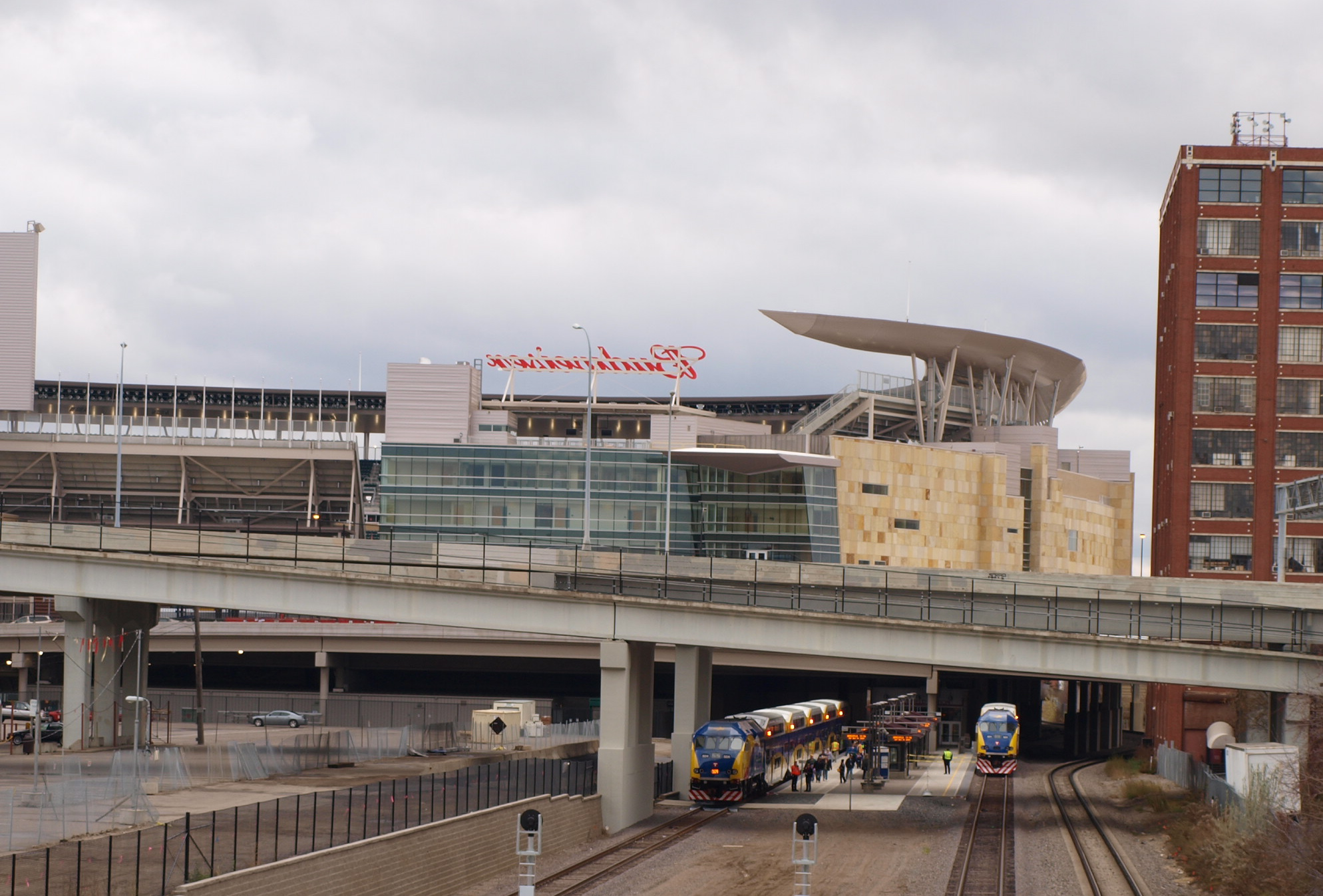
View of the commuter platform in front of the nearly-complete Target Field. The upper light-rail platforms are obscured by bridges.

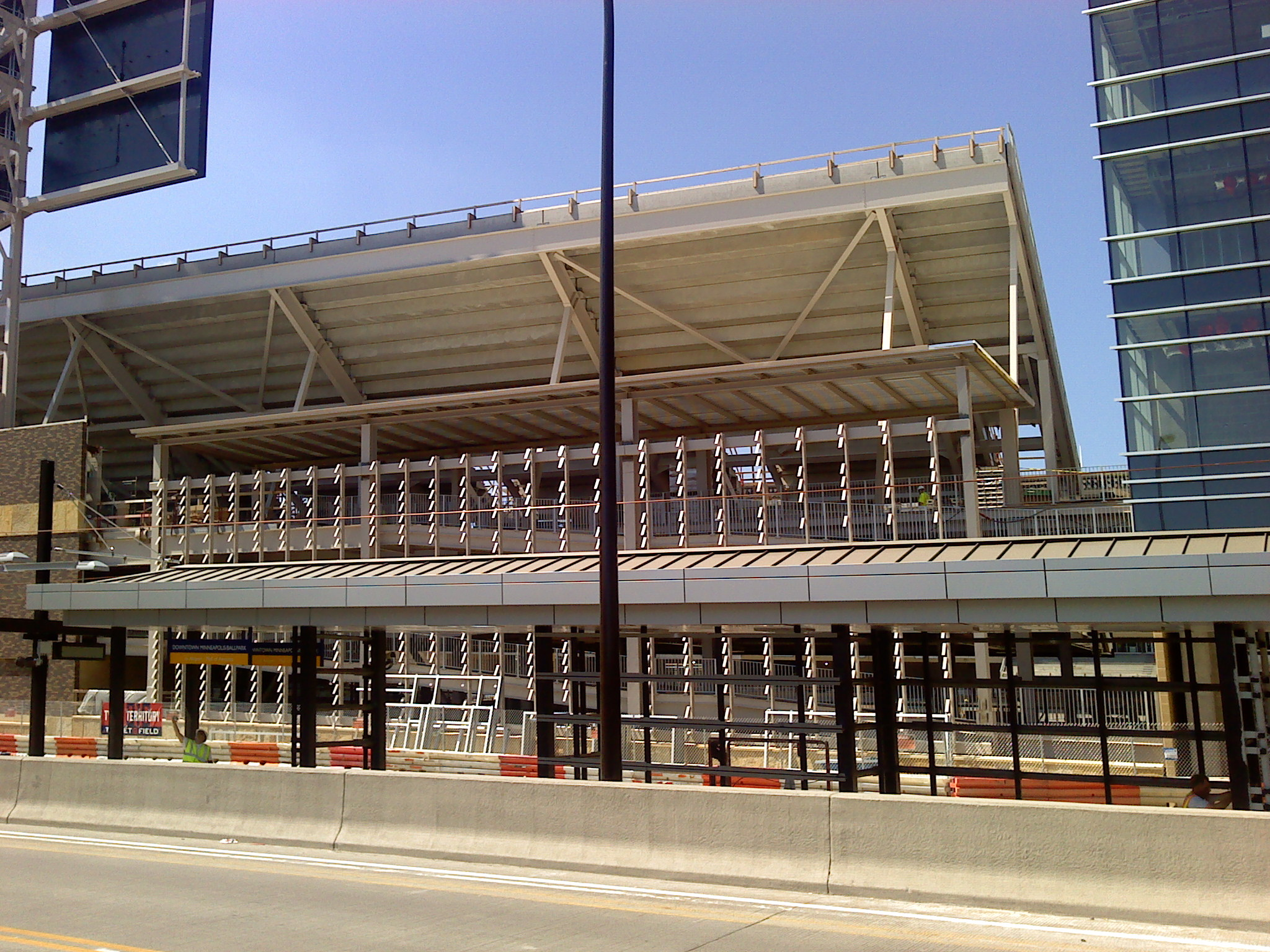
First pair of light rail platforms, June 2009. Note the "Downtown Minneapolis/Ballpark" platform signage

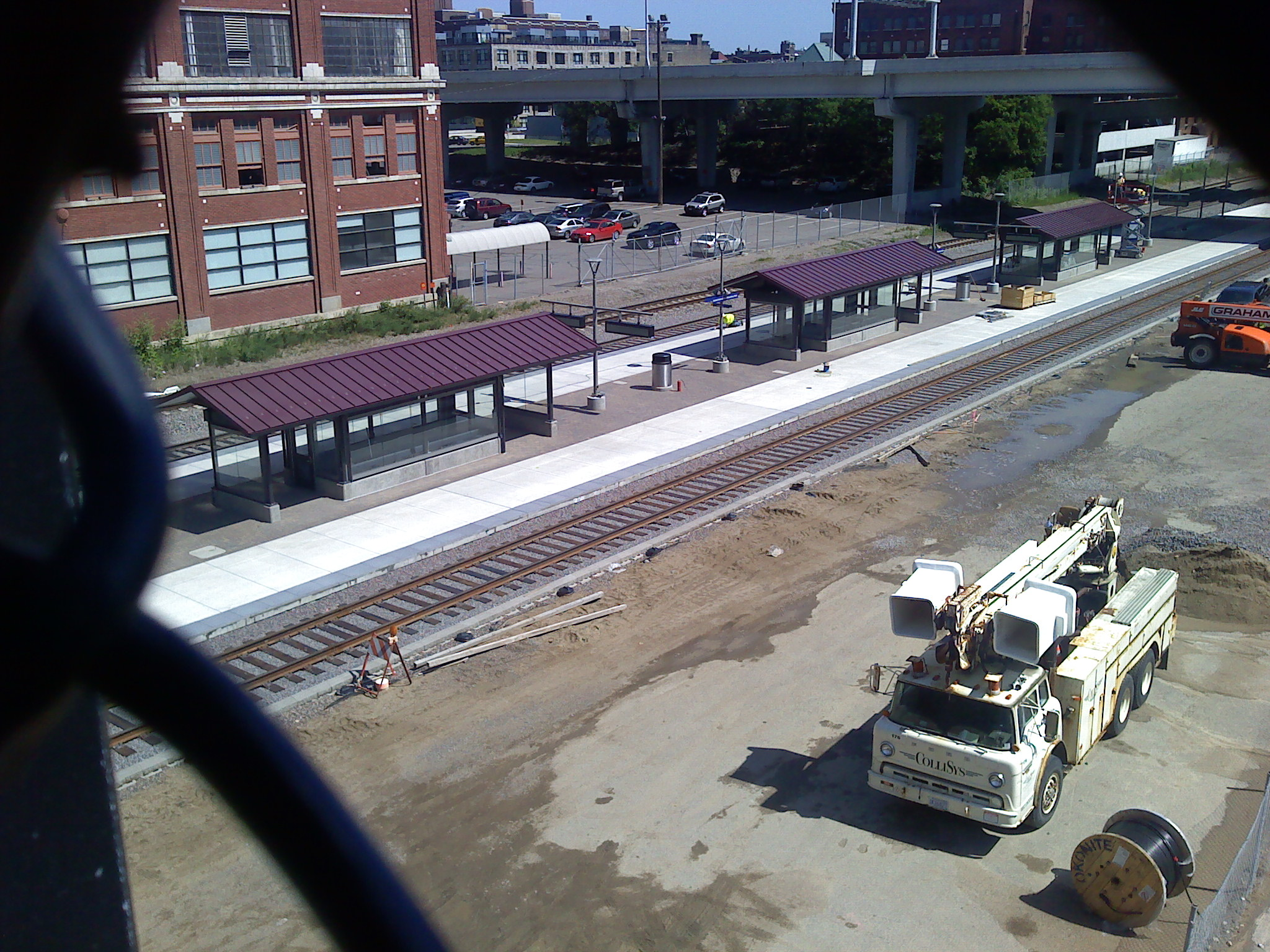
Northstar platform, June 2009
