= Metro H Line (Minnesota) =

Planned bus rapid transit line

Overview
- System: Metro
- Operator: Metro Transit
- Status: In planning
- Predecessors: Route 3

Route
- Route type: Bus rapid transit
- Locale: (Hennepin County); Minneapolis, Minnesota (Ramsey County); Saint Paul, Minnesota
- Start: Downtown Minneapolis
- Via: Como and Maryland Avenues
- End: Sun Ray Transit Center, Saint Paul
- Length: 17 miles (27 km)
- Stations: 40

The Metro H Line is a planned bus rapid transit (BRT) line in the Minneapolis–Saint Paul area operated by Metro Transit. It will primarily operate on Como and Maryland Avenues, along the current Route 3, between downtown Minneapolis and Sun Ray Transit Center in eastern Saint Paul.

It will be Metro Transit's eighth BRT line operating on an arterial corridor. H Line stations will have amenities standard among other Metro lines, including enhanced lighting, heating, garbage receptacles, security features, benches, bicycle parking, pay-at-the-station fareboxes, and NexTrip displays showing real-time departure information. As of April 2025, the project is not fully funded and is seeking a combination of federal, state, and Metropolitan Council funds.

The project is currently in the planning phase and will undergo station design through 2027, with construction scheduled for the following two years. The line will have approximately 40 stations over 17 miles. It will have numerous connections to the existing and planned Metro light rail and BRT network, including the Blue, Green, Gold, Orange, C, D, E, F, and K Lines in downtown Minneapolis, the A Line at Snelling Avenue, the G Line at Rice Street, the Bronze Line along Maryland Avenue, and the Gold Line at Sun Ray Transit Center. It will provide access to 170,400 jobs, including 60,600 low-wage jobs. 45% of riders of the existing Route 3 are people of color or live in low-income households. The project's preliminary planning budget is $118 million.

== See also ==
- Metro Transit
- Metro
- Metro D Line
