= Metro J Line (Minnesota) =

Planned bus rapid transit line

Overview
- System: Metro
- Operator: Metro Transit
- Status: In planning
- Predecessors: Route 54

Route
- Route type: Bus rapid transit
- Locale: (Hennepin County); Bloomington, Minnesota (Ramsey County); Saint Paul, Minnesota
- Start: Mall of America station
- Via: West 7th Street
- End: Downtown Saint Paul

The Metro J Line, formerly the Riverview Corridor, is a planned bus rapid transit line connecting Downtown Saint Paul and the Mall of America in Bloomington via the Minneapolis-Saint Paul International Airport. The corridor serves an area from the Saint Paul Union Depot to the Mall via a route along West 7th Street, which runs southwest from Downtown Saint Paul. The corridor creates a triangle connecting opposite ends of the Blue Line and Green Line.

The corridor has served as an important transportation link in the Twin Cities since territorial days when it connected downtown Saint Paul and Fort Snelling. Streetcars and later buses connected destinations along West Seventh St, the main thoroughfare of the corridor, since 1884. Streetcars were removed in 1952 and from 1998 to 2012 bus service improvements were identified as the preferred alternative with busway and later arterial bus rapid transit projects studied.

Renewed study started in 2013 and the results of work done from 2014-2017 identified a modern streetcar system similar to systems in Portland, Kansas City, and Detroit as the locally preferred alternative with an alignment along West Seventh Street and MN-5. On September 6th, 2024 Ramsey County announced that planning efforts for the modern streetcar project were cancelled.

In March 2025, the City of Saint Paul announced a renewed effort to pursue BRT along the corridor, with a projected cost of $500 million and planned opening in the early 2030s. In January 2026, after having previously been announced as being added to Metro's arterial planned BRT lines in October 2025 as the project partners for the West 7th Street Corridor were unable to come to an agreement, Metro Transit announced that it had been recommended to become the Metro J Line.

== Geography of corridor ==
West Seventh Street is also known as Fort Road because the road began as a route to Fort Snelling. The original Fort Road ran further south of West Seventh along the river bluff. Modern day Cliff Street and Stewart Avenue follow around the route of Old Fort Road. The road was platted in 1849 but the route had been used before as the last stretch of an oxcart trail for a fur trading route connecting Canada to Saint Paul via Fort Snelling.

=== West Seventh neighborhood ===
The West Seventh neighborhood is one of the oldest in Saint Paul. The neighborhood follows along West Seventh Street and is bound on the north by I-35E or the River Bluffs and by the Mississippi River to the South. It formed in the late 1830s from discharged soldiers and other pioneers building houses along the Mississippi River. Later, a boat dock south of Fort Snelling known as the Upper Landing became an important landing spot for dropping off settlers and supplies. The neighborhood grew as waves of settlers and immigrant came to the area to farm or work for local industrial sites. A sizable amount of industry is located between the Mississippi River and south of West Seventh Street. Workers built their houses close to local industry and different ethnic enclaves developed with the different waves of immigrants.

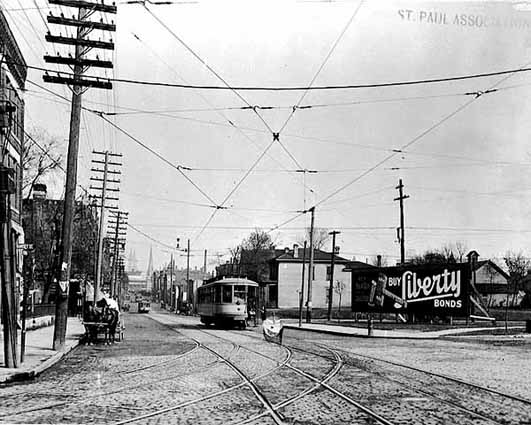
Streetcars run along West Seventh Street in 1918.

Development tended to spread southwest from the Upper Landing, later known as Uppertown, southwest to Fort Snelling along Fort Road. By 1884 a horse drawn street car line traveled along a portion of West Seventh Street. The streetcar line later became electrified by 1891. The line extended to Tuscarora Street by 1890 and to river bluff by 1891. Four other lines also traveled partially along the corridor on their path to Downtown. The line stopped just short of Fort Snelling on the Saint Paul side of Fort Road Bridge. The lack of an extension to Fort Snelling became undesirable to soldiers who wanted an easy connection to the city and civilians who worked on the military reservation. After a new bridge was constructed in 1909 the line was extended to the other side of the river. A free streetcar shuttle was constructed in Fort Snelling that met with the West Seventh line and then traveled in a single track in Fort Snelling. The Fort Snelling shuttle stopped operating in 1952 and the streetcar line was converted to a bus line in 1952 along with the rest of the Twin Cities transit system.

The Minneapolis-Saint Paul International Airport was constructed near Fort Snelling in 1921. When it became a major transit hub the corridor was extended to the airport. In the 1989 a county transit plan for Ramsey County was made. The corridor between the airport and Downtown Saint Paul was considered an important corridor. When the Mall of America was constructed the corridor was extended to the mall. The route was first named the Riverview Corridor in February 1997 after the Ramsey County board unanimously voted the corridor as a higher priority than the Central Corridor.

=== Difficulty constructing I-35E ===
The federal government as part of the Interstate Highway System began to plan for a missing link of Interstate 35E. The type of connection and location of the connection were both met with controversy. The missing piece through the West Seventh neighborhood, from State Highway 5 (West 7th Street) northeast to I-94 in downtown Saint Paul, was held up by controversy. Construction began in 1964, and was planned for completion in the 1970s as a typical six-lane freeway, but the National Environmental Policy Act was passed on January 1, 1970. In late 1969, Residents in Protest 35E (R.I.P. 35E) formed to oppose the completion of I-35E. The group convinced the city to drop its support, and in August it filed a lawsuit which successfully halted construction pending an environmental impact statement (EIS). The Saint Paul City Council decided in late 1974 to support I-35E but later changed its support a R.I.P. 35E proposed alternative. The plan included a four-lane boulevard upgrade of Pleasant Avenue (the street chosen for the I-35E alignment), with another route such as Shepard Road or the nearby Lafayette Freeway forming part of I-35E. The group opposed any direct connection to I-94 near the State Capitol, where I-35E and I-94 were to merge. The EIS was completed in early 1975, identifying the primary benefit of completing I-35E to be connecting downtown Saint Paul to the Interstate Highway System, and the EIS determined that the original Pleasant Avenue corridor was the best choice.

A bill passed by the Minnesota Legislature on May 31, 1975, imposed a moratorium on building I-35E while allowing several possible state highway routes that could be added to the Interstate Highway System. Two routes offered a direct connection to I-94, while a third was a parkway with no direct connection. Saint Paul changed its mind again in September 1981, supporting a direct connection, along with Mn/DOT and the Metropolitan Council. A bill passed in March 1982 removed the stipulation that the parkway shall not connect to I-94, and allowed (I-35E) to use the parkway route. The final EIS was approved at about that time, and several groups including R.I.P. 35E filed suit in early 1983. The EIS was ruled valid and construction went forward. I-35E was opened from Highway 5 north to I-94 on October 15, 1990, 26 years after construction began.

== Potential alignments ==
There are several different variations of the corridor but all of them have the Mall of America as one terminus and the Airport and Downtown Saint Paul as destinations. There were four possible routes along this section of the corridor; West Seventh Street, Interstate 35E, Shepard Road and along Canadian Pacific Railway tracks. West Seventh Street would be the most direct route but the right of way would need to be expanded. Interstate 35E already had an available right of way but created a longer route and bypassed many stretches of the West Seventh Neighborhood. Shepard Road is a direct route to Downtown but is out of the way of many ride generating places. The Canadian Pacific Railway right of way follows roughly along West Seventh but would be difficult to acquire the right of way rights.

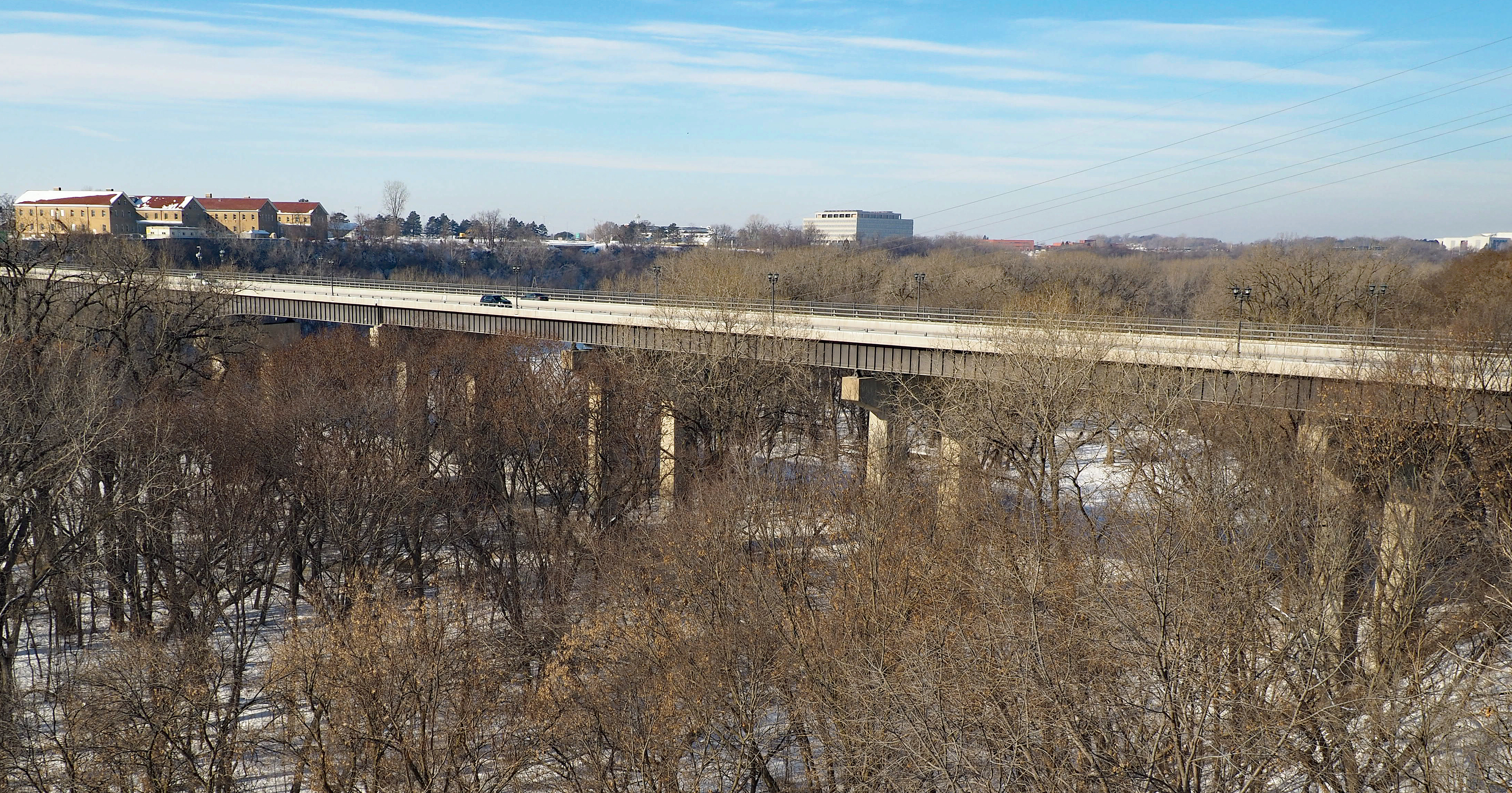
South elevation of the Fort Road Bridge viewed from the Saint Paul side

Every route requires crossing the Mississippi River from Saint Paul to Fort Snelling. The current Fort Road Bridge was built in 1960 by the Minnesota Department of Transportation and was designed by Sverdrup & Parcel Engineering Company. It is the third bridge on the site, the first bridge, a deck girder bridge was built in 1880. The second bridge, a metal arch bridge was built by 1912. While almost all of the proposed routes would use the Fort Road Bridge, one suggested using a rail spur north and using the Ford Parkway Bridge upstream. Both routes would have had potential problems with the adaptation of the current bridge. When using the Fort Road Bridge, it was unknown if it could handle light rail or if a tunnel on the Fort Snelling side of the bridge could be widened. If the Ford Parkway bridge was used there were additional concern with the alignment of the route to the bridge. The second bridge at the Fort Road site and the Ford Parkway Bridge had held streetcar traffic.

== Bus Rapid Transit studies from 1997-2002 ==
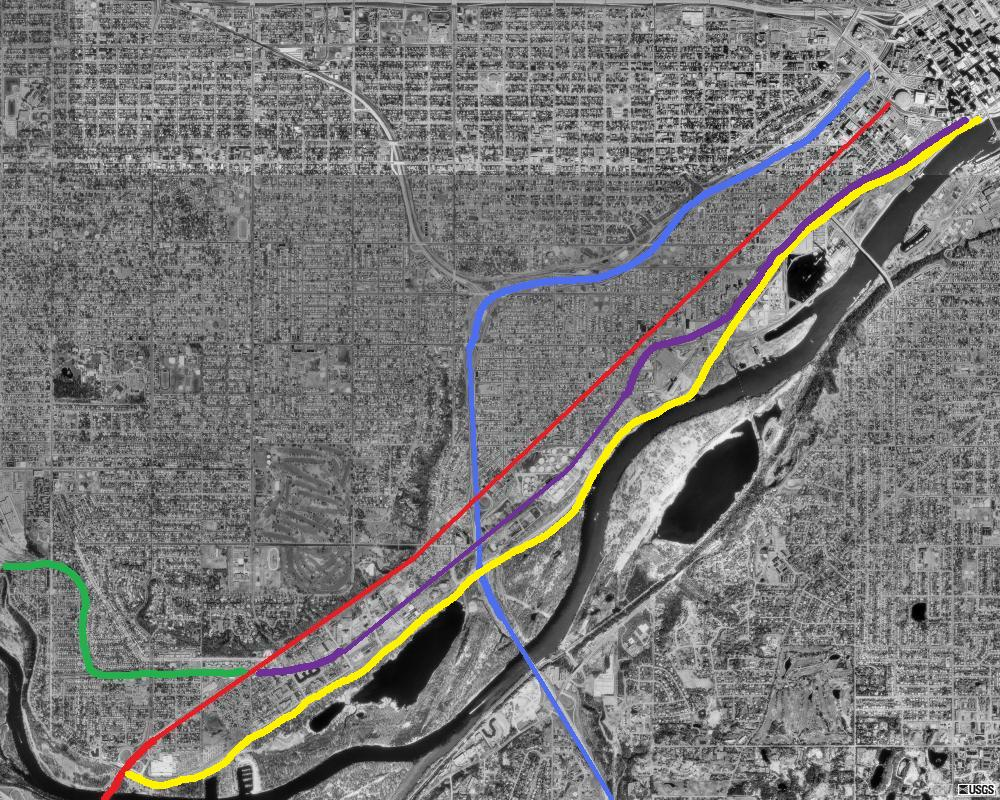
Different possible alignments of the Riverview Corridor

The corridor was first identified for transit improvements around 1989 as part of regional transit studies. The route was first named the Riverview Corridor in February 1997 after the Ramsey County board unanimously voted the corridor as a higher priority than the Central Corridor. A study in 1998 by the Ramsey County Rail Authority determined that light rail would not be cost effective and that a busway would be the more viable. During the 2000 Minnesota legislative session there was a $525 million budget surplus of new ongoing state revenue. In order to compromise, the surplus would be split and spent with one third of the money each going to the House, the Senate and the Governor. Governor Jesse Ventura decided to use his $175 million portion of the surplus to lower auto license fees. After finding out it would be cheaper than expected Ventura agreed to allocate $44 million to a busway project. While the Riverview Corridor was not specifically mentioned, it was generally understood to be for the Corridor.

Plans for the corridor soon developed and the route was finalized. The line would run along West Seventh street through the East Side of Saint Paul to the Maplewood Mall by 2004 with service increasing to every 7.5 minutes. Unlike the then Bus Route the new service would travel along West Seventh the entire way to Downtown rather than taking I-35E. They included widening West Seventh, from I-35E to Smith Avenue, by 4 feet in order to create bus-only lanes. Traffic signals would have been timed so buses would have priority. The section along the Phalen Corridor would become a dedicated transitway. There would have been 23 stations with the option to have pre-boarding fare collection.

The bill for the busway was inserted into an unrelated bill in conference committee in the last weekend of the legislative session with no legislative hearings. The method was described as "in clear violation of legislative rules." House Republicans opposed the project but acquiesced in order to end the legislative session. Critics of the Riverview Corridor argued that it would duplicate service of the Metro Transit Bus Route 54. The Route travels along the Corridor from the Mall of America to Downtown Saint Paul. There were also concerns about the low ridership projections. Only 16,000 people a day for light rail and only 12,000 a day on a busway were projected to travel along the route. The project was supported much more on Saint Paul's Eastside than along West Seventh Street. West Seventh residents and businesses were concerned about loss of parking and sidewalk space because of the need to expand the street by 4 feet. In March 2002, $40 of the $46.1 million devoted to the project was taken back by the Legislature in order to balance the State's budget. The project was cut largely due to opposition and lack of strong support.

== Bus service improvements and arterial bus rapid transit study ==
In 2002 plans were announced to introduce improved interim bus service along a portion of Route 54. The plan changed Route 54 from traveling along Interstate 35E from West Seventh to Downtown Saint Paul, to entirely along West Seventh and operating every 15 minutes as opposed to every 30 minutes. The change added 3 minutes to the 20 Minute trip from the Airport to Downtown and the 30 minutes trip from the Mall of America to Downtown. When money from the project was cut in March 2002, this was the extent of the Route's improved service. Plans to change and improve service reappeared when Metro Transit redesigned their service in 2003. Bus Route 69 from Maplewood Mall to along West Seventh via Downtown Saint Paul had its route west of Downtown, along West Seventh, eliminated. Route 54 is currently a limited stop route and one of 14 routes that operate as a High Frequency route with service every 15 minutes or better. Metro Transit Route 54 was extended past downtown Saint Paul to Maplewood Mall in 2018 as part of a federal grant. The project's total cost of $7.2 million is expected to boost ridership from 4,200 weekday rides to 6,500 by 2021. Buses, shelters, and operating costs were included in the project's cost. Half of Route 54's trips were extended from Mall of America to Maplewood Mall which results in service every 20 minutes during rush hour and 30 minutes during other times.

The Metropolitan Council, the metropolitan planning organization for the Twin Cities, set the goal of doubling transit ridership by 2030 in their 2030 Transportation Policy Plan. One of the methods identified to increase ridership was implementing arterial bus rapid transit. West Seventh Street and East Seventh Street were two of nine arterial streets that are recommended for bus rapid transit. The 2030 Transit Master Study for the region also identified arterial bus rapid transit features and encouraged further study of several corridors. Metro Transit began study of 11 corridors for their potential for bus rapid transit in 2011-2012 with the goal of opening the first BRT line in 2014. By 2012, Snelling Avenue and West Seventh Street were identified as the first two candidates for implementation. Limited stop bus operations on West Seventh Ave would have allowed BRT-style improvements to be more easily integrated. The corridor was initially identified as the second best candidate for upgrades with an opening in 2016 but work on the project was deferred so Ramsey County could study further transit options in the corridor. The title of Metro B Line was eventually given to the Lake Street-Marshall Avenue-Selby Avenue Corridor from Uptown, Minneapolis to downtown Saint Paul.

== Modern streetcar project ==
On January 23, 2013, the Saint Paul City Council voted in favor of requesting the Ramsey County Regional Rail Authority to conduct a new transit study of the Riverview Corridor.

The Ramsey County Regional Railroad Authority studied the corridor from 2014 to 2017 as part of Pre-Project Development. The study researched, analyzed and identified opportunities to improve transit within the Riverview Corridor. This study involved reviewing the viability of transit modes, transit location, engineering issues, community needs and preferences, and estimated costs. The study included extensive public involvement and outreach effort to assure community input informs the project's vision and the results of the analysis. The study determined that light rail as seen on the Green and Blue Lines in the region would not be suitable for the corridor but a streetcar with smaller vehicles and stations could be further explored.

Since the Pre-Project Development Study, the Ramsey County Board approved the route for the corridor along W. 7th St. Construction on the corridor could start in 2028 at the earliest. In 2023, the project released three concepts with two featuring streetcars and a third featuring upgraded bus service. The streetcar alternatives would require upgrades to the Fort Road Bridge and a new station near the Mall of America. The earliest a streetcar could begin service would be in 2032. The two streetcar concepts would cost around $2.1 billion compared to $121 million for arterial bus rapid transit project, but the streetcar projects would include reconstructing West Seventh Street and a new bridge over the Mississippi River.

On September 6, 2024, Ramsey County announced that they would end work and cancel any future meetings on the Riverview Corridor project based on community feedback. Rafael Ortega, the Ramsey County commissioner who represents that area and is chair of the county's Regional Rail Authority, cited opposition from the Metropolitan Airports Commission (MAC) as one of the final straws that led to cancellation of the project. MAC did not have veto authority over the project but was concerned about reducing the number of lanes on a new Fort Road Bridge and how it would delay airport travelers. Some local business owners opposed the project due to construction disruptions and loss of street parking.

== Renewed bus rapid transit study ==
In March 2025, the City of Saint Paul announced a renewed effort to pursue bus rapid transit along the Riverview Corridor, branded as "The New West 7th Corridor". The planned line would include 21 stations over 12.5 miles, with 16 stations being new. Several transit advantages would be included as a part of the project, including a bypass of the Interstate 494/34th Avenue interchange in Bloomington, a bus guideway and regional trail along a Canadian Pacific Rail spur in Saint Paul, and bus lanes and signal priority along the corridor. Preliminary estimates place the project's cost at between $450 and 500 million with a planned opening in the early 2030s.
