= Streetcars in Minneapolis =

Streetcars in Minneapolis may refer to:

- Twin City Rapid Transit Company, which ran a streetcar system in the Twin Cities until 1954
- Existing and proposed light rail lines in the Twin Cities:
  - Blue Line
  - Green Line
  - Green Line Extension
  - Blue Line Extension
  - Robert Street Corridor
- The proposed, modern streetcar system in Minneapolis
