= University Line =

University Line may refer to:

- University Line (METRORail), a formerly planned bus rapid transit route in Houston, Texas, United States
- University Line (Pittsburgh Regional Transit), a planned light rail line in Pittsburgh, Pennsylvania, United States
- University Line (TRAX), a former light rail line in Salt Lake City, Utah, United States
- University/4th Street Line, a planned streetcar route in Minneapolis, Minnesota, United States
- Line 1 Yonge–University, a rapid transit line in Toronto, Ontario, Canada
