= F Line =

F Line may refer to:

- F (New York City Subway service)
- F (Los Angeles Railway), a former rail route in Los Angeles, United States
- F Line (RTD), a light rail line in Denver, United States
- F (S-train), an urban rail line in Copenhagen, Denmark
- F Market & Wharves, the historic streetcar line in San Francisco
- F (AC Transit), a bus route in the San Francisco Bay Area
- Line F (Buenos Aires Underground)
- Metro F Line (Minnesota), a planned bus rapid transit line in Minneapolis–Saint Paul, Minnesota, United States
- RapidRide F Line, a bus route in King County, Washington, United States
