= Metro B Line (Minnesota) =

Bus rapid transit line

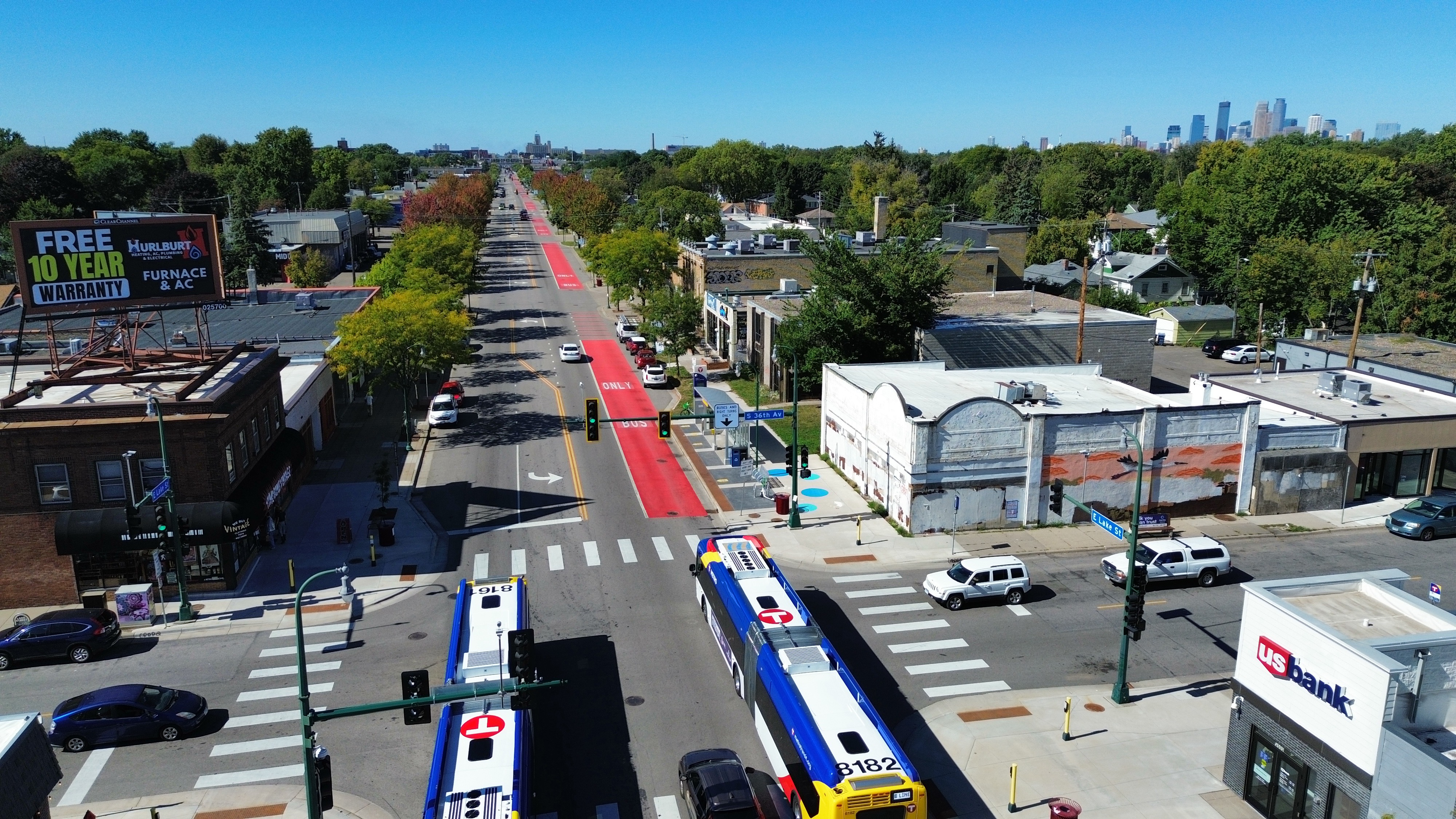
- Aerial view of two B Line buses at Lake St and 36th Ave

Overview
- System: Metro
- Operator: Metro Transit
- Garage: East Metro
- Vehicle: New Flyer XD60
- Status: Operational
- Predecessors: 21, 53, Selby-Lake Streetcar

Route
- Route type: Bus rapid transit
- Locale: Minneapolis–St. Paul, Minnesota
- Start: Lake & France Station
- Via: Lake Street, Selby Avenue
- End: Union Depot Station
- Length: 13 mi (21 km)
- Stations: 34 (7 one-way station pairs)

Service
- Ridership: 9,690 (avg. weekday 2025)

The Metro B Line is a bus rapid transit route in the Minneapolis–Saint Paul region of Minnesota, operated by Metro Transit as part of the Metro network. The route began operation in June 2025, connecting Saint Paul Union Depot to Bde Maka Ska in the Uptown neighborhood of Minneapolis, via Lake Street and Selby Avenue. The B Line succeeds Metro Transit's Route 21, adding transit signal priority, bus lanes, and all-door boarding to provide faster and higher quality service.

Lake Street and Selby Avenue have formed an important east-west travel corridor since the early 20th century. The corridor was served by streetcars until the 1950s, and has been served by buses since. Planning for the B Line began in 2014, and full funding for construction was secured in 2020. Construction began in 2023, and progressed through the 2023 and 2024 construction seasons. The line opened to the public as scheduled on June 14, 2025, although its opening ceremony was cancelled due to security concerns following the shootings of multiple Minnesota legislators earlier that day.

== Background ==
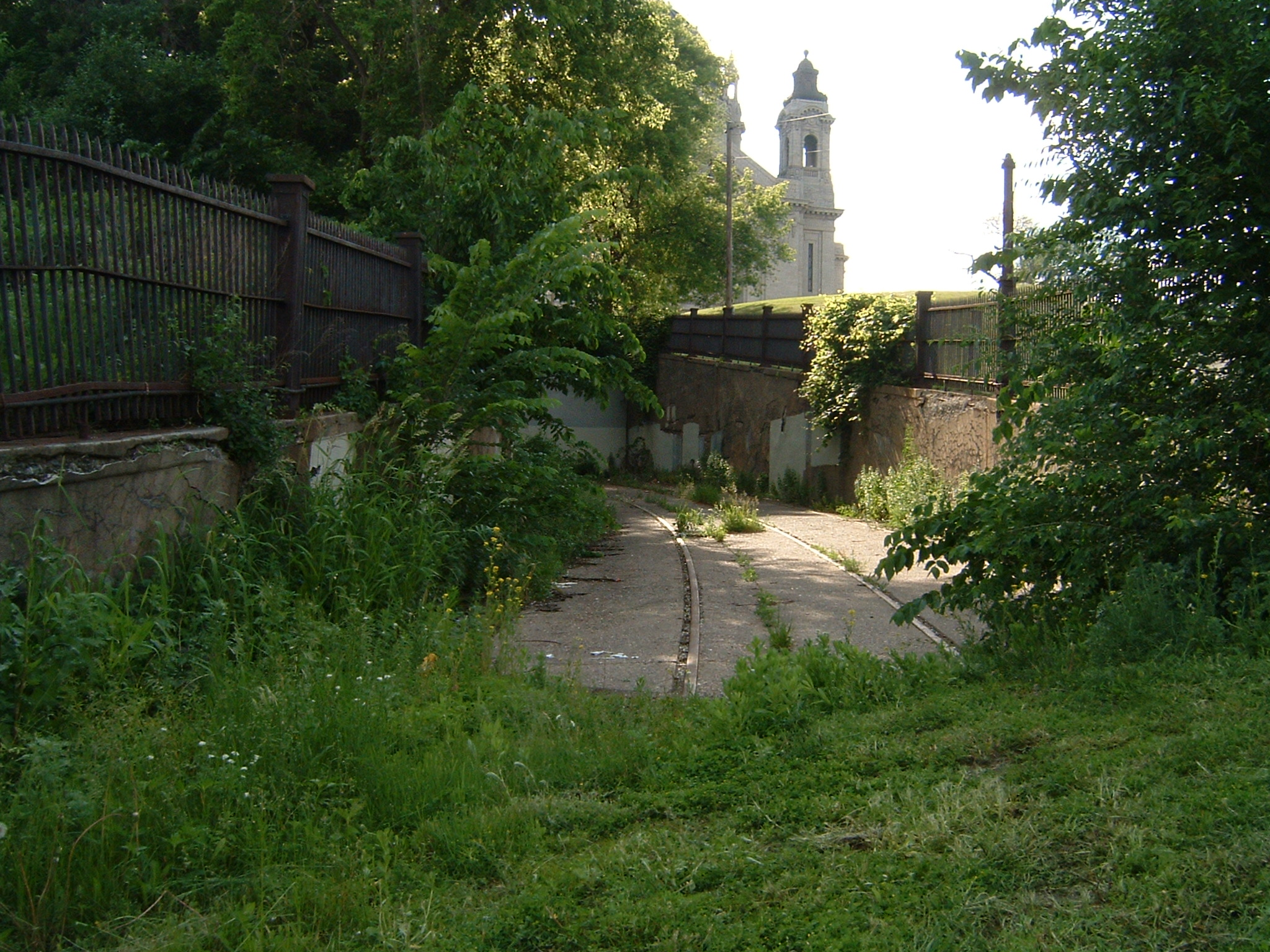
Entrance to the abandoned Selby Avenue streetcar tunnel, which served the B Line's predecessor streetcars

The corridor has a long history of transit service. The Twin City Rapid Transit Company operated a streetcar on Selby Avenue and Lake Street starting in 1906. Once the streetcars were replaced in the 1950s with buses, a bus route continued to operate over the route. Route 21 served the corridor from Uptown Transit Center to the Union Depot in downtown Saint Paul.

Buses on the corridor formerly traveled on the National Register of Historic Places-listed Selby Avenue Bridge over Ayd Mill Road. When the bridge was in the process of being replaced in 1993, buses were detoured a half mile north to University Avenue. Increased ridership led Metro Transit to leave the detour in place following completion of the replacement bridge.

In 2011 and 2012, Metro Transit studied eleven urban transit corridors to be upgraded with enhanced bus improvements. Other corridors identified in the study included Snelling Avenue, Penn Avenue, and Chicago Avenue, which are currently in operation as the Metro A, C, and D Lines respectively.

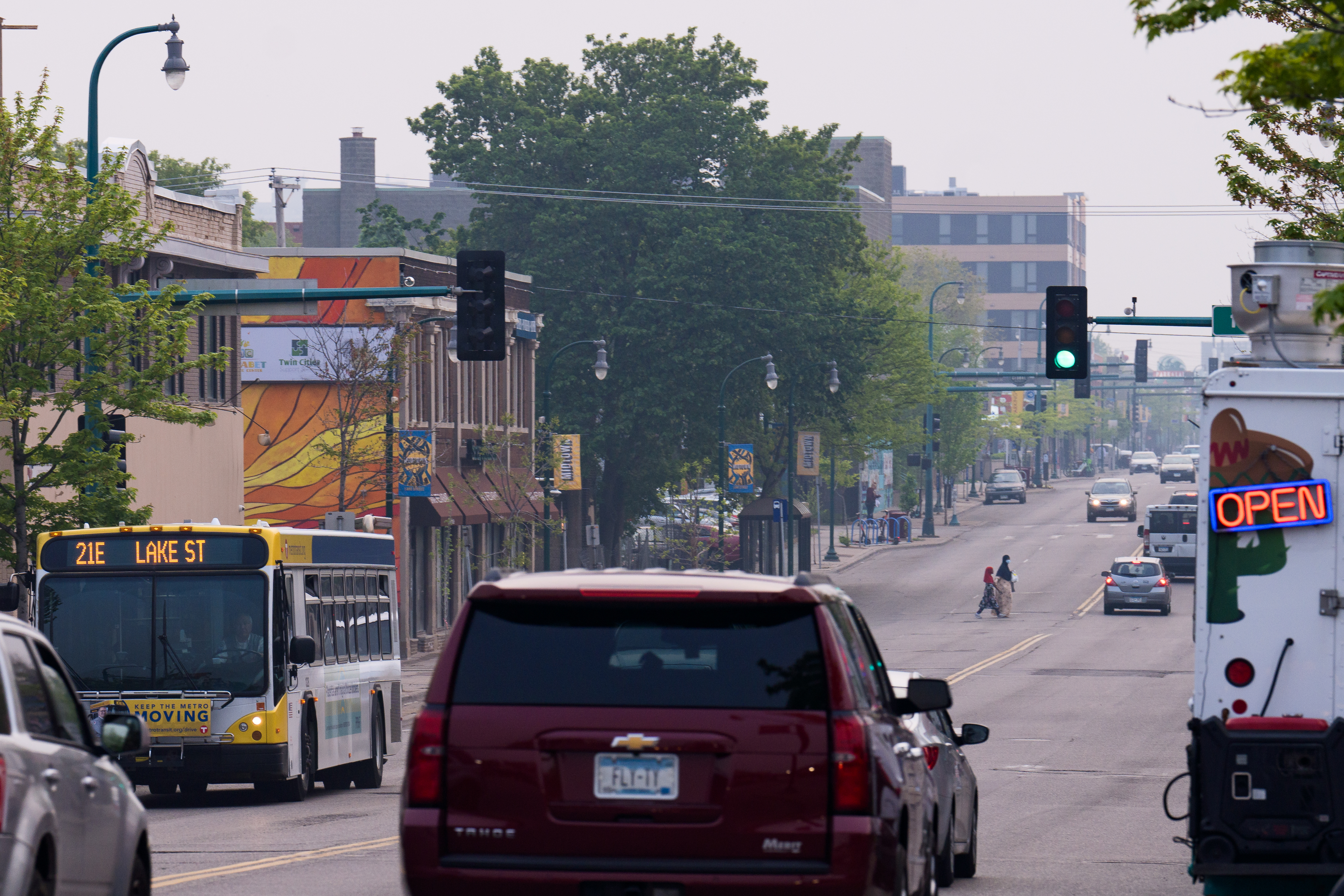
Route 21 bus in Midtown, Minneapolis in 2023

Route 21 served over 10,000 passengers per weekday in 2019, which made it Metro Transit's second-busiest route. A limited-stop bus, Route 53, operated during peak periods offering limited stop service along Lake Street and Marshall Avenue before traveling on I-94 to downtown Saint Paul. Average speeds for Route 21 and 53 were 10 and 13.2 miles per hour respectively in 2019, which made Route 21 one of the slowest routes in the Twin Cities. In May 2019, the B Line project was estimated to cost $54 million. By October 2019, $16 million in funding had been identified from a competitive federal grant for a total of $26 million. The line was fully funded after $35 million was included in the state bonding bill in October 2020.

In early 2019, project staff identified the possibility of extending the line past Snelling Avenue into downtown St. Paul via Selby Avenue. Six routing options between Snelling Avenue and Lexington Parkway were considered, all of which would connect to METRO A Line. In downtown, the B Line would share enhanced stations with the Metro Gold Line before terminating at Union Depot.

The B Line route was modified from Route 21 to eliminate the route's deviation north to University Avenue in Hamline-Midway, which was introduced in 1993 as a temporary detour. Planners cited ridership data from Route 21 to support the change, which shows that the revision would benefit a larger number of passengers traveling longer distances. The revised route avoids traffic congestion on University Avenue, and planners argue that improved services on north-south bus routes in the area make up for the changes.

Prior to the opening of the B Line, route 53 was discontinued in March 2025 after having been suspended since 2020 due a driver shortage.

== Service ==
B Line frequency
Type	Span of service	Frequency
Early Weekdays	5:00 a.m. – 6:30 am	15–30 minutes
Weekdays	6:30 a.m. – 7:00 pm	10 minutes
Late Weekdays	7:00 p.m. – 1:00 am	15–30 minutes
Saturday	5:30 a.m. – 1:30 am	10–30 minutes
Sunday	5:30 a.m. – 1:30 am	10–30 minutes

The B Line runs every 10 minutes during daytime service on weekdays and weekends, with reduced frequencies of up to 30 minutes in the early morning and late evening. As part of service changes with the B Line, route 21 was discontinued, with local service on Lake Street being provided hourly by a restored and modified route 27. Local service on Selby Avenue and to the Midway shopping area was provided half-hourly by an extension route 70, renumbered to route 72. Routes 23 and 612 were combined into new route 38 with the routing realigned to overlap with the B Line between Excelsior Boulevard and Lyndale Avenue.

== Route ==
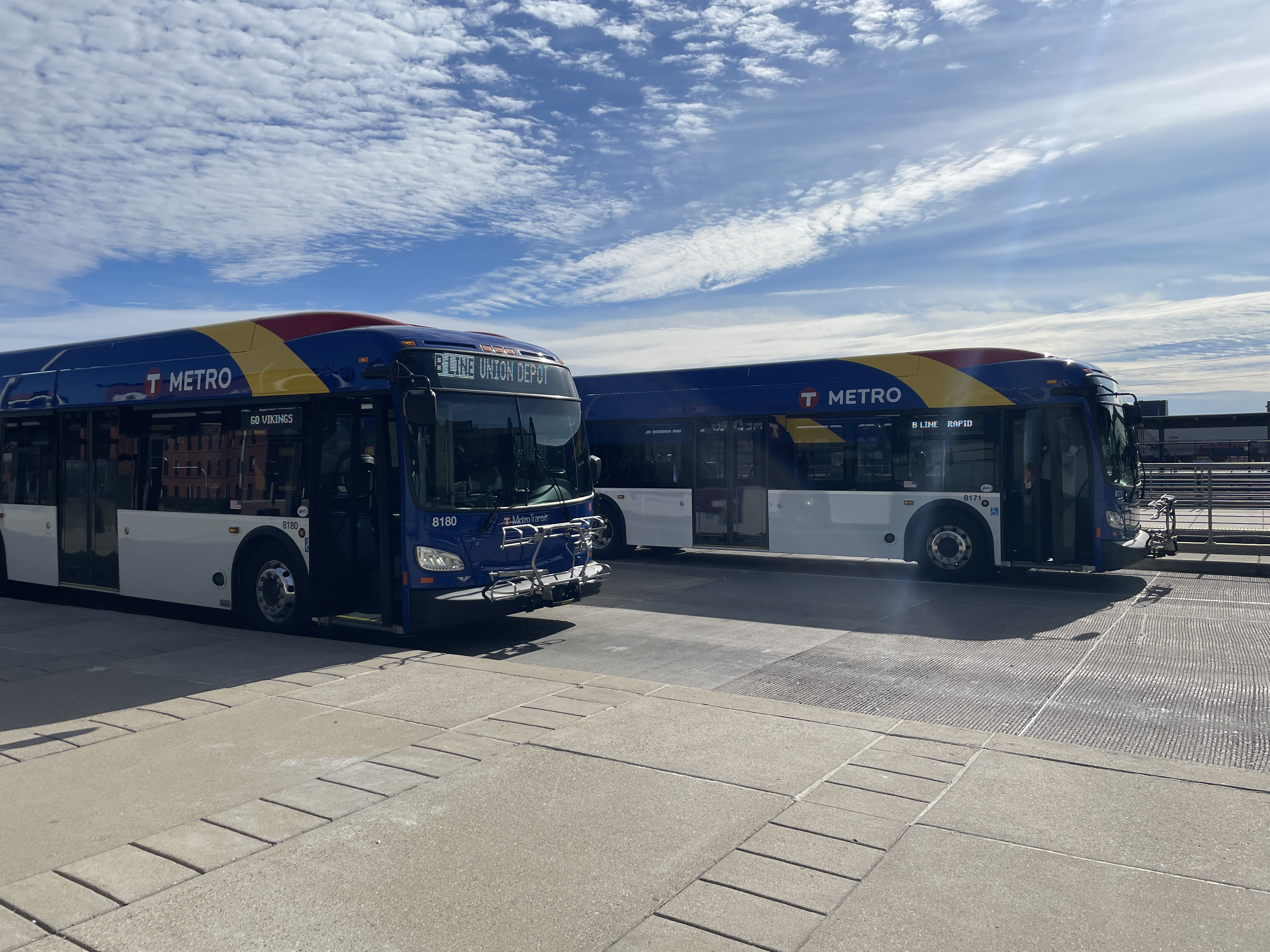
B Line buses at the bus terminal at Union Depot in Saint Paul, Minnesota

The Metro B Line originates at Lake Street and France Avenue in the West Maka Ska neighborhood of Minneapolis, and runs along Lake Street to the Mississippi River. East of the Mississippi River, the B Line travels along Marshall Avenue and Selby Avenue to Summit Avenue in Saint Paul. At Summit Avenue, the site of the former Selby Avenue streetcar tunnel, the B Line shifts north to meet the Downtown Saint Paul street grid, using 5th Street eastbound and 6th Street westbound. B Line buses serve a pair of stations near the north entrance of Union Depot before terminating at the station's main bus terminal.

=== Stations ===
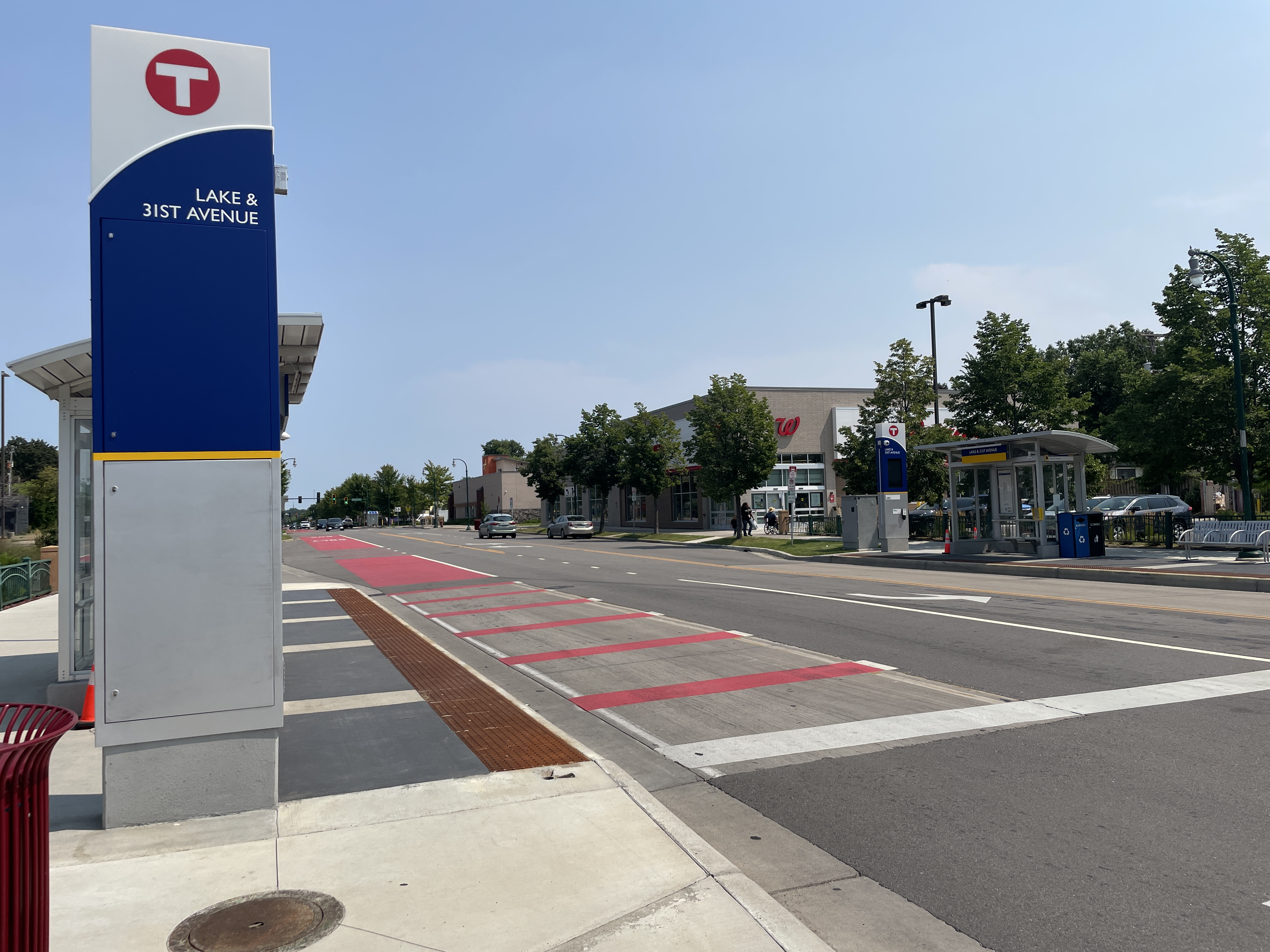
B Line station at Lake Street and 31st Avenue

Stations as part of Metro Transit's aBRT (arterial bus rapid transit) service are unique to differentiate them service from local bus stops. Each station has a pylon marker that provides station identification, real time information, and audible departures. Unique shelters feature lighting, heating, emergency telephones and security cameras, and station areas will have seating, bike parking, and trash and recycling. To speed up boarding, platforms are raised 9 in (23 cm) from the pavement to facilitate near-level boarding though any door. Passengers pay before boarding using Go-To card readers or ticket vending machines.

=== Connections ===
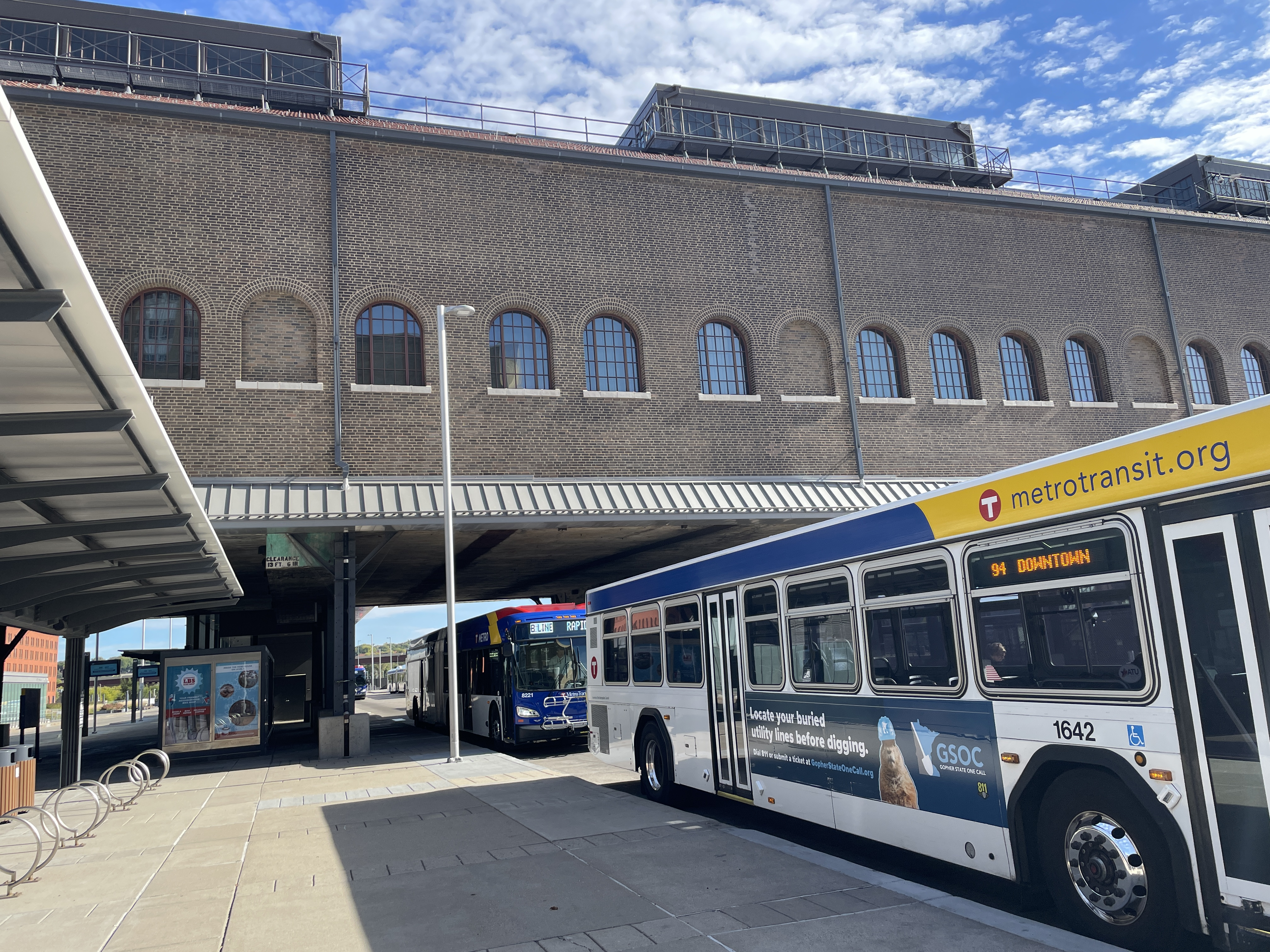
Union Depot bus terminal with Route 94 and B Line

The B Line is a major east-west route in the Metro Transit system, and connects to multiple regional and local transit services. The B Line will connect to the future Metro Green Line extension at its West Lake Street station. The B Line connects to the Metro Orange, D, E, and Blue Lines, and shares a station with the Metro A Line at Snelling Avenue and Dayton Avenue. The easternmost stops in Saint Paul are shared with the Metro Gold Line.

Metro B Line station locations and connecting routes
Station		Neighborhood(s)	City	Connections
Lake & France		West Maka Ska	Minneapolis	Route 17
West Lake Street		Cedar Isles Dean, West Maka Ska	Minneapolis	Route 17, Metro Green Line
Lake & Dean/West Bde Maka Ska		Cedar Isles Dean	Minneapolis	Routes 17, 38
Lake & East Bde Maka Ska	Lagoon & East Bde Maka Ska	Cedar Isles Dean, East Bde Maka Ska	Minneapolis	Routes 17, 38
Lake & Hennepin	Lagoon & Hennepin	East Isles, Lowry Hill East, South Uptown, East Bde Maka Ska	Minneapolis	Routes 6, 17, 27, 38, 114, Metro E Line
Lake & Lyndale		Lowry Hill East, Whittier, Lyndale, South Uptown	Minneapolis	Routes 4, 27, 38, 113
Lake & Nicollet		Whittier, Lyndale	Minneapolis	Route 18, 27
Lake & I-35W		Whittier, Phillips West, Central, Lyndale	Minneapolis	Routes 27, 460, 465, 467, 470, 472, 475, 477, 600, 695, Metro Orange Line
Lake & 4th/5th		Phillips West, Central	Minneapolis	Routes 11, 27
Lake & Chicago		Phillips West, Midtown Phillips, Powderhorn Park, Central	Minneapolis	Route 5, Metro D Line
Lake & Bloomington		Midtown Phillips, East Phillips, Powderhorn Park	Minneapolis	Route 14
Lake & Cedar		East Phillips, Corcoran, Powderhorn Park	Minneapolis	Routes 22, 27
Lake Street/Midtown		East Phillips, Longfellow, Corcoran	Minneapolis	Route 27, Metro Blue Line
Lake & Minnehaha		Longfellow	Minneapolis	Routes 7, 27
Lake & 31st Ave		Longfellow	Minneapolis	
Lake & 36th Ave		Longfellow	Minneapolis	Route 9
Lake & 44th Ave		Cooper	Minneapolis	
Marshall & Otis		Union Park	Saint Paul	
Marshall & Cretin		Union Park	Saint Paul	Route 63, 134
Marshall & Cleveland		Union Park	Saint Paul	Route 87
Marshall & Fairview		Union Park	Saint Paul	
Snelling & Dayton		Union Park	Saint Paul	Metro A Line
Selby & Hamline		Union Park	Saint Paul	Route 72
Selby & Lexington		Union Park, Summit-University	Saint Paul	Routes 72, 83
Selby & Victoria		Summit-University	Saint Paul	Route 72
Selby & Dale		Summit-University	Saint Paul	Routes 65, 72
Selby & Western-Arundel		Summit-University	Saint Paul	Route 72
John Ireland & Marshall		Summit-University	Saint Paul	Route 72
Smith Ave Ramp	Smith & 5th St	Downtown Saint Paul	Saint Paul	Metro Gold Line, many downtown bus routes
6th St & Washington St	Rice Park	Downtown Saint Paul	Saint Paul	Metro Gold Line, many downtown bus routes
6th St & Minnesota	5th St & Cedar	Downtown Saint Paul	Saint Paul	Metro Green Line, Metro Gold Line, many downtown bus routes
6th St & Jackson	5th St & Robert St	Downtown Saint Paul	Saint Paul	Metro Gold Line, Metro G Line, many downtown bus routes
Union Depot & Sibley	Union Depot & Wacouta	Downtown Saint Paul	Saint Paul	Metro Green Line, Metro Gold Line, many downtown bus routes
Saint Paul Union Depot		Downtown Saint Paul	Saint Paul	Metro Green Line, Metro Gold Line, many downtown bus routes

== See also ==
- Metro A Line
- Metro C Line
- Metro D Line
- Metro E Line
