= 10th Street =

10th Street may refer to:

- Tenth Street Freedman's Town (United States historic place)
- Tenth Street, Atlanta
- Tenth Street, Los Angeles, former name of Olympic Boulevard
- 10th Street (Manhattan), an east–west street from the West Village neighborhood of the New York City borough of Manhattan to Avenue D in the East Village
- 10th Street station (Metro Transit), a planned light rail stop along the Central Corridor line in downtown Saint Paul, Minnesota
- 10th Street Middle School, a middle school in Tulalip, Washington, United States incorporating grade levels 6-8
- Tenth Street Promenade station, a peoplemover station in the Brickell district of Downtown Miami
- 10th Street galleries, an American artist collective

== See also ==
- Tenth Avenue (disambiguation)
