= 10th Street station (Metro Transit) =

Light rail station in Saint Paul, Minnesota

10th Street
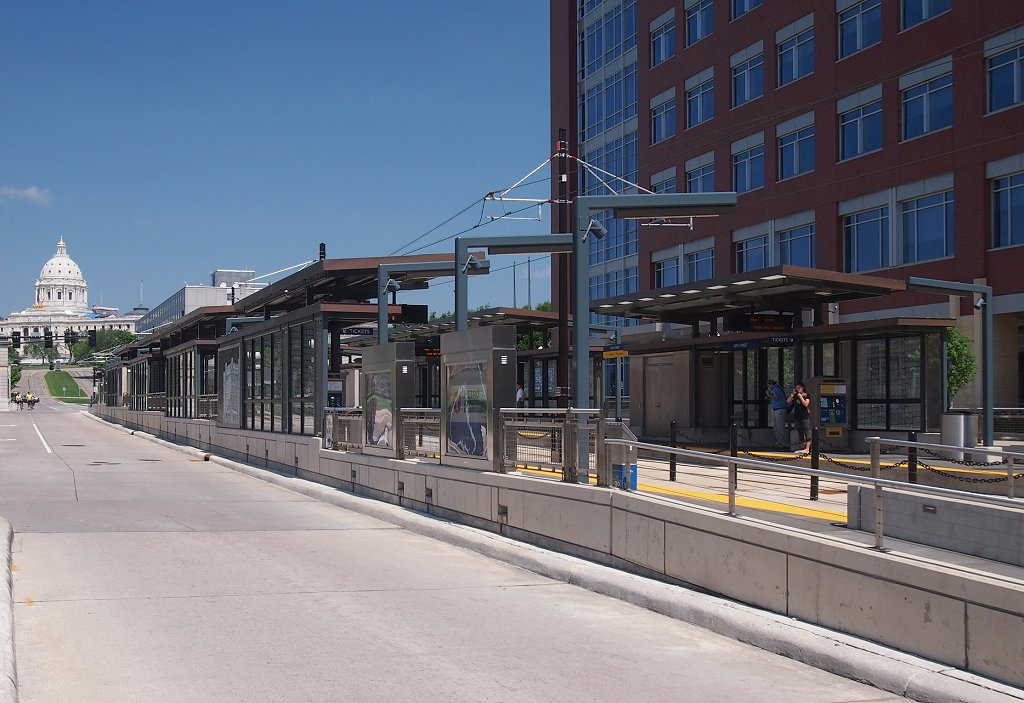
- 10th Street station platform looking toward the Minnesota State Capitol

General information
- Location: 519 Cedar Street; Saint Paul, Minnesota
- Coordinates: 44°57′02″N 93°05′51″W
- Owner: Metro Transit
- Platforms: 2 side platforms
- Tracks: 2
- Connections: Metro Transit: 3, 16, 62, 67

Construction
- Structure type: At-grade
- Cycle facilities: Nice Ride station
- Accessible: Yes

Other information
- Fare zone: Downtown

History
- Opened: June 14, 2014

Passengers
- 2025: 629 daily ▼40.8%
- Rank: 27 out of 37

Services
Preceding station	Metro	Following station
Robert Street toward Target Field	Green Line	Central toward Saint Paul Union Depot
Location

10th Street station is a light rail stop along the Metro Green Line in downtown Saint Paul, Minnesota. It is located along Cedar Street between 11th Street and 10th Street. This is just south of Interstate 94.

Construction in this area began in June 2011. The station opened along with the rest of the line in 2014.
