= Robert Street station =

Light rail station in Saint Paul, Minnesota

Robert Street
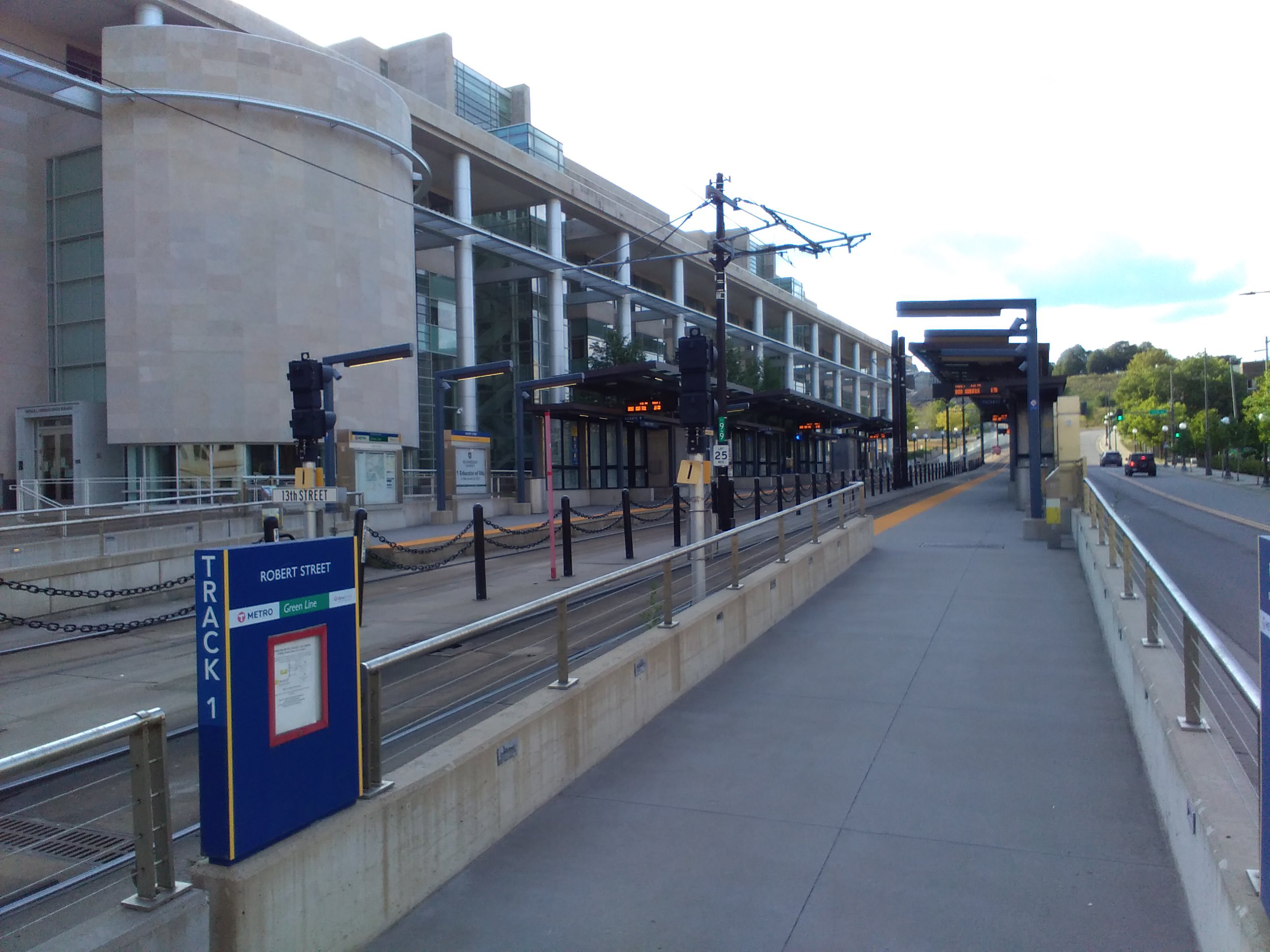
- Robert Street station platform

General information
- Location: 613 Robert Street North; Saint Paul, Minnesota
- Coordinates: 44°57′14″N 93°05′51″W
- Owner: Metro Transit
- Platforms: 2 side platforms
- Tracks: 2
- Connections: Metro Transit: 68, 71

Construction
- Structure type: At-grade
- Cycle facilities: Nice Ride station
- Accessible: Yes

Other information
- Fare zone: Downtown

History
- Opened: June 14, 2014
- Former names: Capitol East

Passengers
- 2025: 384 daily ▼23%
- Rank: 33 out of 37

Services
Preceding station	Metro	Following station
Capitol/Rice Street toward Target Field	Green Line	10th Street toward Saint Paul Union Depot
Location

Robert Street station (called Capitol East station during planning) is a light rail station along the Metro Green Line in Saint Paul, Minnesota. It is located on the west side of Robert Street between 14th Street and Columbus Avenue. This is in an area of government buildings a short distance from the Minnesota State Capitol.

Construction in this area began in August 2010. This station opened along with the rest of the line in 2014.
