= Tenth Avenue =

Tenth Avenue or 10 Av may refer to:

== Roads ==
- Tenth Avenue (Manhattan)
- 10th Avenue, Caloocan, a roadway in Caloocan, Philippines

== Bridges ==
- 10th Avenue Bridge

== Subway stations ==
- 10th Avenue station (IRT Flushing Line)
- 10th Avenue station (PNR)

== Other uses ==
- Tenth Avenue Gang
- Tenth Avenue Angel
- Tenth Avenue North
- 360 Tenth Avenue
- Tenth Avenue (film), a 1928 American silent film
- 10 Av, the tenth day of Av, the fifth month of the Hebrew calendar

== See also ==
- 10th Street (disambiguation)
