= Fort Road Bridge =

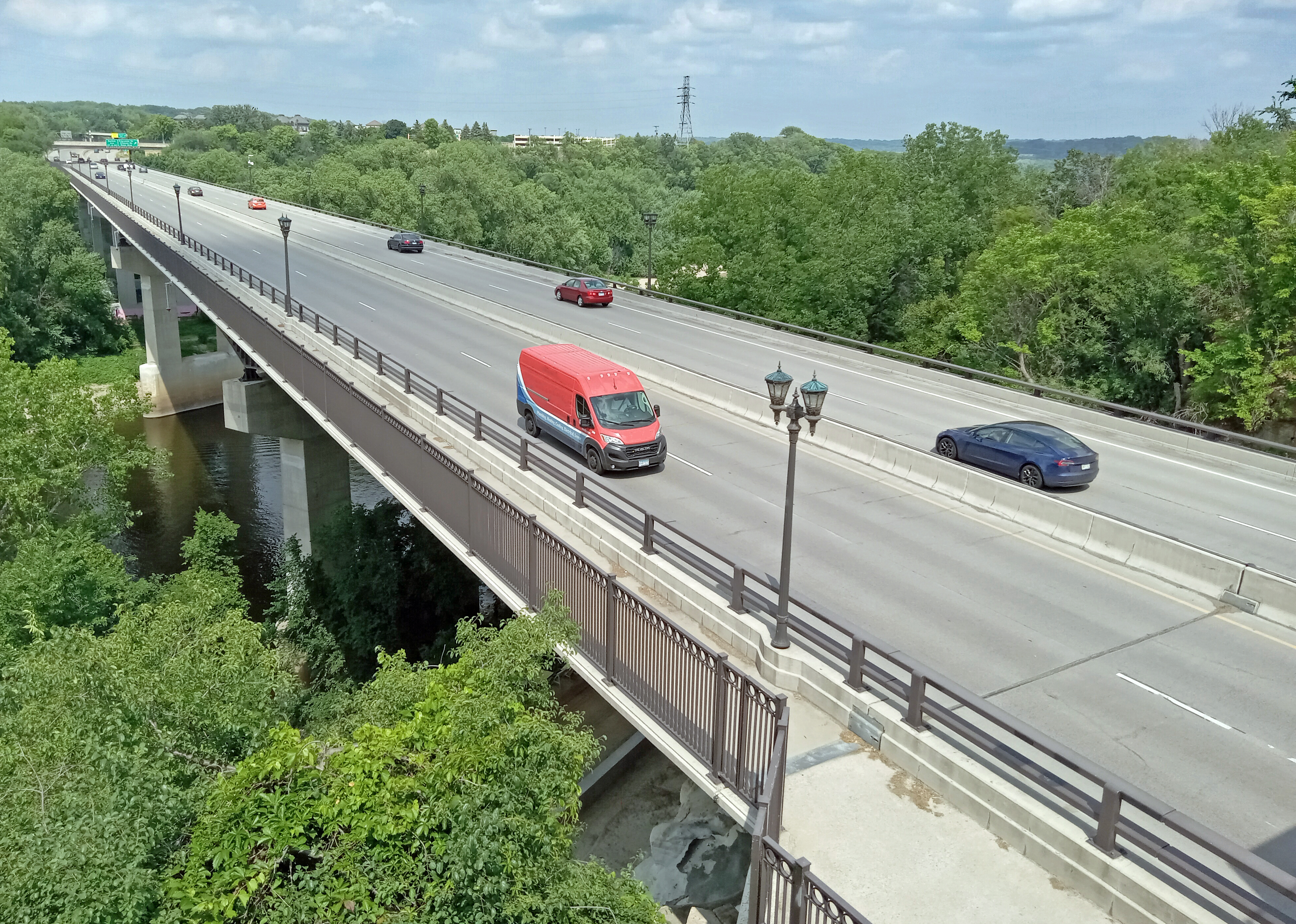
- South elevation of the Fort Road Bridge viewed from Fort Snelling, Minnesota
- Coordinates: 44°53′41″N 93°10′53″W
- Carries: Four lanes of MN 5
- Crosses: Mississippi River
- Locale: Saint Paul, Minnesota
- Maintained by: Minnesota Department of Transportation

Characteristics
- Design: Girder bridge
- Total length: 1198.5 feet
- Width: 68 feet
- Longest span: 300 feet
- Clearance below: 59.8 feet

History
- Opened: 1961

Location
- Interactive map of Fort Road Bridge

Fort Road Bridge is a girder bridge that spans the Mississippi River between Saint Paul and Fort Snelling, Minnesota, United States. It was built in 1960 by the Minnesota Department of Transportation and was designed by Sverdrup & Parcel Engineering Company.

It is the third bridge on the site. The first bridge, a deck girder bridge, was built in 1880. The second bridge, a metal arch bridge, was built by 1909 at a cost of $250,000 and was paid for by the United States government, the city of St. Paul, and the Twin City Rapid Transit Company. The current bridge was built slightly north of the 1909 bridge, and is aligned with a tunnel underneath Fort Snelling to minimize disruption to the appearance of the fort.

== Gallery ==
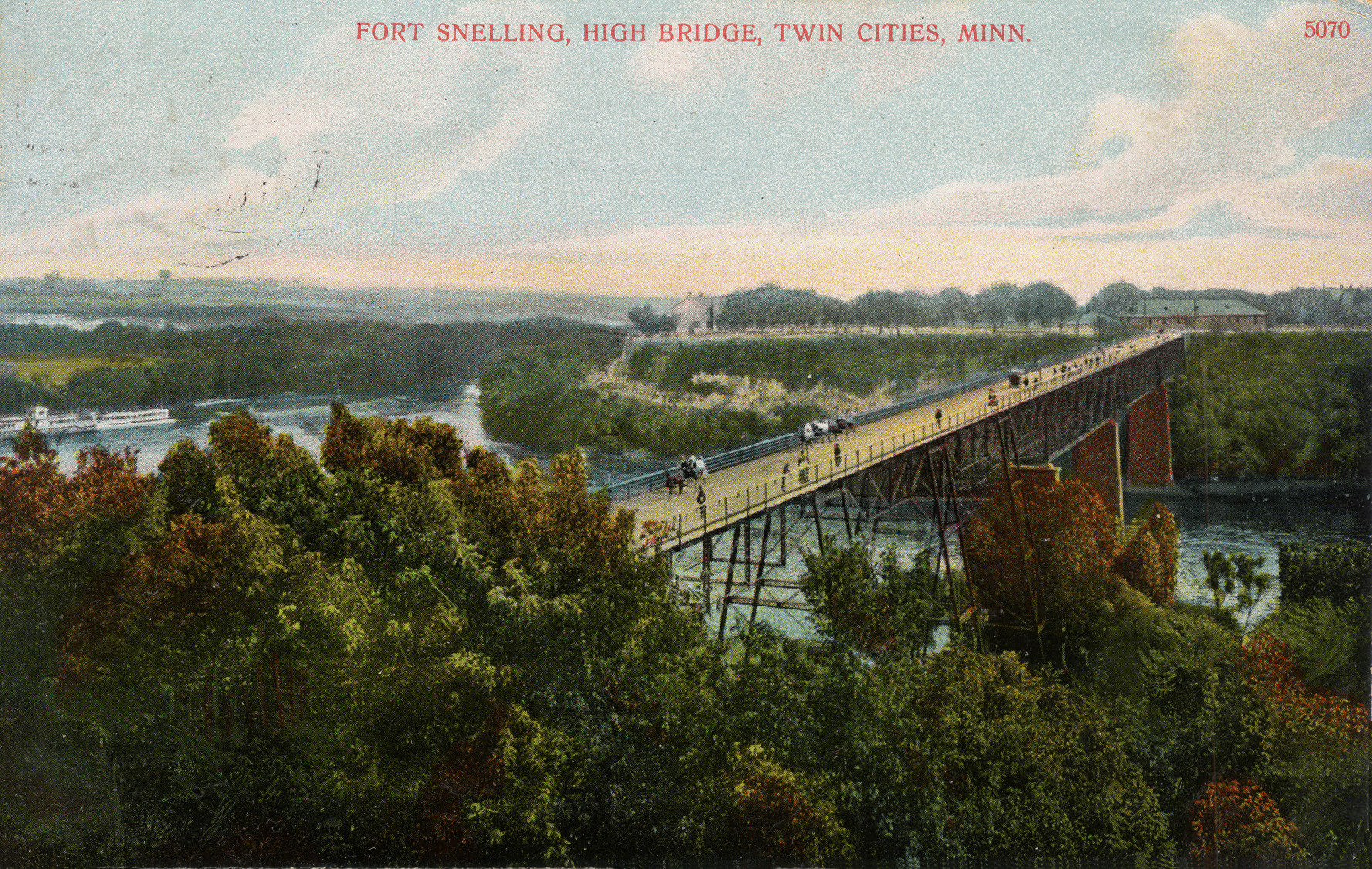
The first bridge,
1880–c. 1909

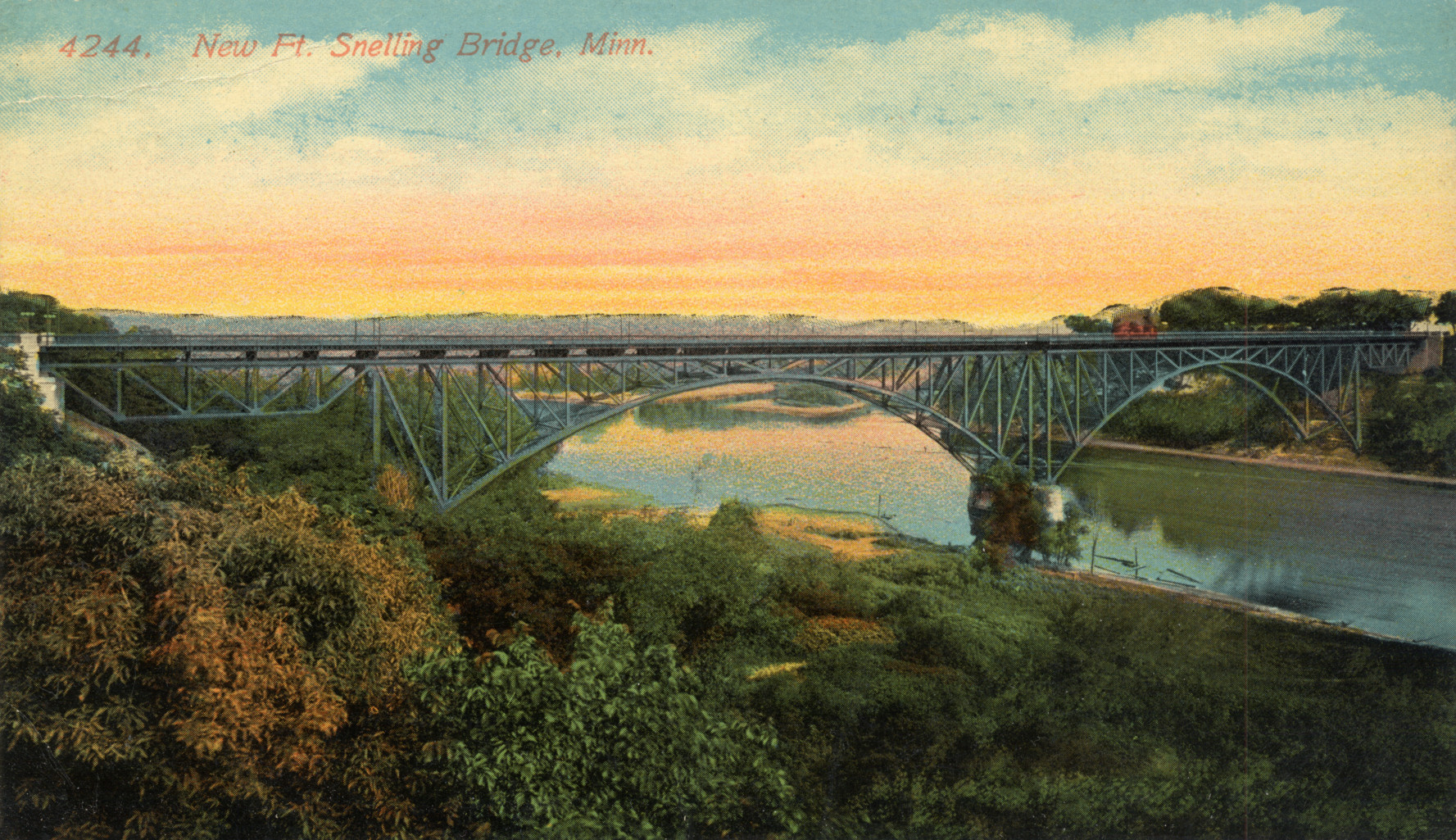
The second bridge, c. 1909–1961

== See also ==
- List of crossings of the Upper Mississippi River
