= Metro Gold Line (Minnesota) =

Bus rapid transit line in Minnesota

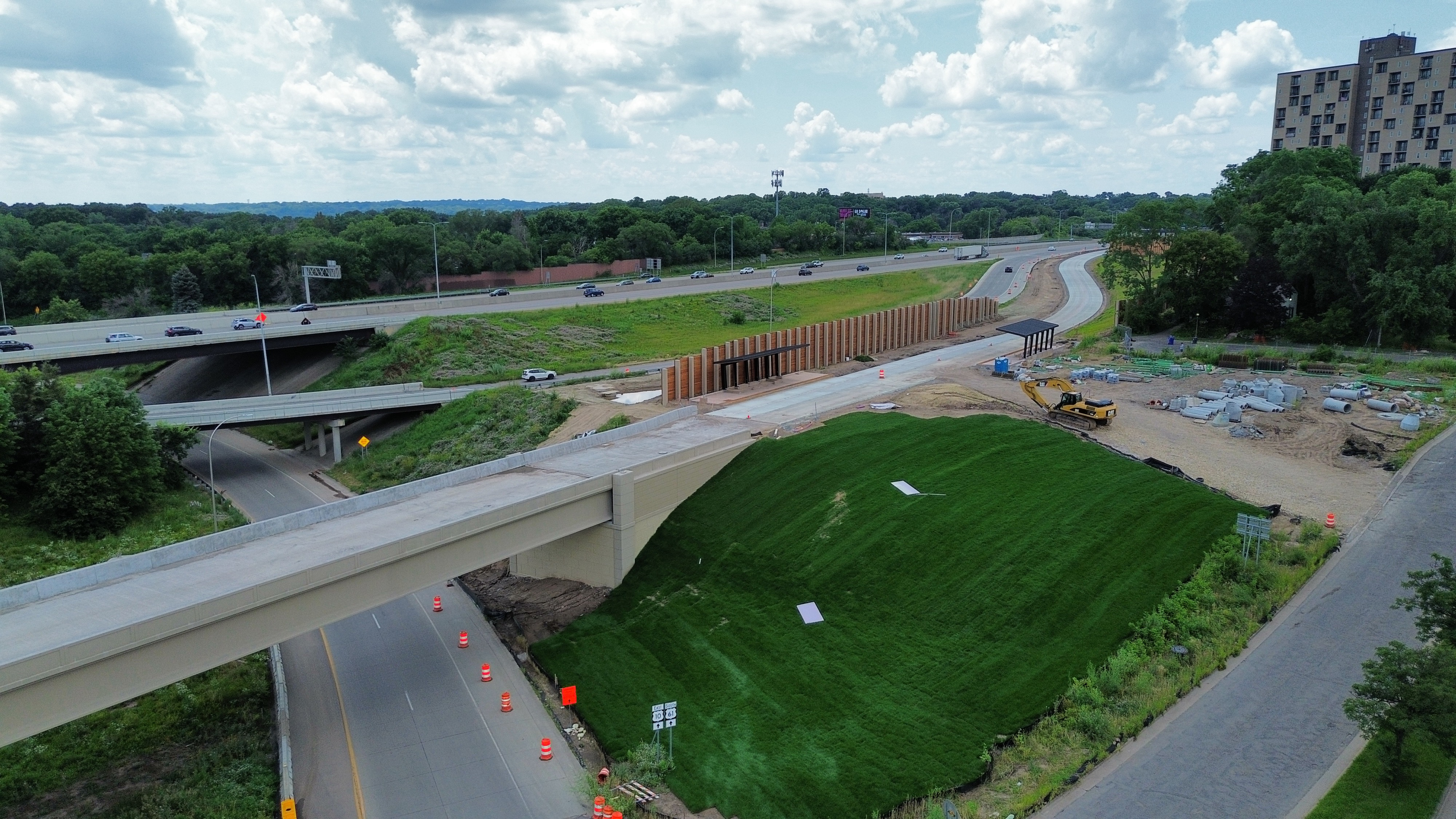

Overview
- System: Metro
- Operator: Metro Transit
- Depot: East Metro
- Vehicle: New Flyer XD60, New Flyer XE60
- Status: Open
- Began service: March 22, 2025; 19 months ago

Route
- Route type: Bus rapid transit
- Locale: (Ramsey County); Saint Paul, Minnesota; Maplewood, Minnesota (Washington County); Landfall, Minnesota; Oakdale, Minnesota; Woodbury, Minnesota
- Landmarks served: 3M Headquarters; Metropolitan State University
- Start: Downtown Saint Paul
- End: Woodbury, Minnesota
- Length: 9 mi (14 km)
- Stations: 11

Service
- Ridership: 1,388 (avg. weekday 2025)

The Metro Gold Line is a bus rapid transit line in the Minneapolis–Saint Paul region of Minnesota, operated by Metro Transit as part of the METRO network. The approximately 10-mile (16 km) line runs from Woodbury to Downtown Saint Paul, using a dedicated busway parallel to Interstate 94 for much of its route. Gold Line service operates every 10 to 15 minutes, 7 days per week.

Planning for the line began in 2009 as the Gateway Corridor, and construction began in 2022. Service began on March 22, 2025, and Metro Transit plans to extend the Gold Line to Downtown Minneapolis in March 2027.

== History ==
Originally, the Gateway Corridor was planned to follow Interstate 94 from the St. Croix River Bridge in Wisconsin to Saint Paul and is one of the most heavily used and traveled corridors in the Twin Cities metropolitan area. As a result of recent population growth, the Gateway Corridor today moves more than 150,000 vehicles per day. In 2009, a commission was created to study and plan alternative transportation options in the corridor.

In August 2010, the Gateway Corridor Commission and its consultant team initiated a Transit Alternatives Analysis Study (AA), looking at the corridor from the Twin Cities to Eau Claire, Wisconsin. This is the first step in determining the best mode (i.e. light rail, commuter rail or bus rapid transit); estimated ridership, possible routes and stops, and projected costs to build, operate and maintain. In looking at these four main areas, the study helped to address the issues of congestion, potential economic development/revitalization and environmental and social impacts.

The AA Study was expected to take approximately 18 months to complete and is expected to be finished by spring 2012. Final decisions regarding the mode of transit and route will be determined by the Metropolitan Council and Ramsey and Washington County Regional Railroad Authorities. These decisions will help move this from a planning effort into a real, tangible project.

The Gateway Corridor Commission dropped the commuter rail option, leaving only possible bus rapid transit or light rail routes. All of the bus rapid transit route options would run on Interstate 94.

=== Bus rapid transit project development ===
The project was originally expected to end in Lake Elmo, Minnesota. Lake Elmo is known for having a lower density of housing than other suburbs in the area and local city council members had considered adding density to the city near I-94 and the Gold Line in order to preserve a more rural character elsewhere in the city. Years earlier, the city argued with the Metropolitan Council over their directive that Lake Elmo increase density within the city. The Lake Elmo city council voted unanimously to support the project in 2014 but by 2016 the city council with several newly elected members voted against allowing the project to end within the city.

The project also faced opposition from residents in Oakdale, Minnesota, and a non-profit formed to fight the project called Citizens for Smart Transit.

Washington County spent some money collected through the Counties Transit Improvement Board on planning for the Gold Line. Money from the Counties Transit Improvement Board had been mostly spent on projects in the western metropolitan area which led Gold Line supporters to argue that more transit funding should be spent in the east metro including on projects like the Gold Line.

=== Project approval ===
The proposed bus rapid transit line would go from downtown Saint Paul to Woodbury and was proposed to be built by 2024. The project was renamed from the Gateway Corridor to the METRO Gold Line. The line would cost $485 million in 2021 dollars with 45% of that coming from federal sources. The Gateway Corridor Commission estimates 8,600 weekday riders by 2040. The Metropolitan Council approved the locally preferred alternative in December 2016. The project began New Starts Project Development in January 2018. After passing the National Environmental Policy Act with a Finding Of No Significant Impact from the FTA in January 2020, the Metropolitan Council declared no additional environmental review was needed for the project in March 2020.

The project was given a "medium-high" rating by the Federal Transit Administration in March 2021. The rating allows the project to continue into the engineering phase of the FTA's New Starts program. The "medium-high" rating was an improvement over the "medium-low" rating that the project received in January 2020. By adding 350 park-and-ride spaces, ridership projections increased which improved the project's rating. Utility work for the project could start as soon as the summer of 2021.

With three years needed until service could start, developments worth $200–290 million were proposed along the line by April 2021.

== Features and service ==
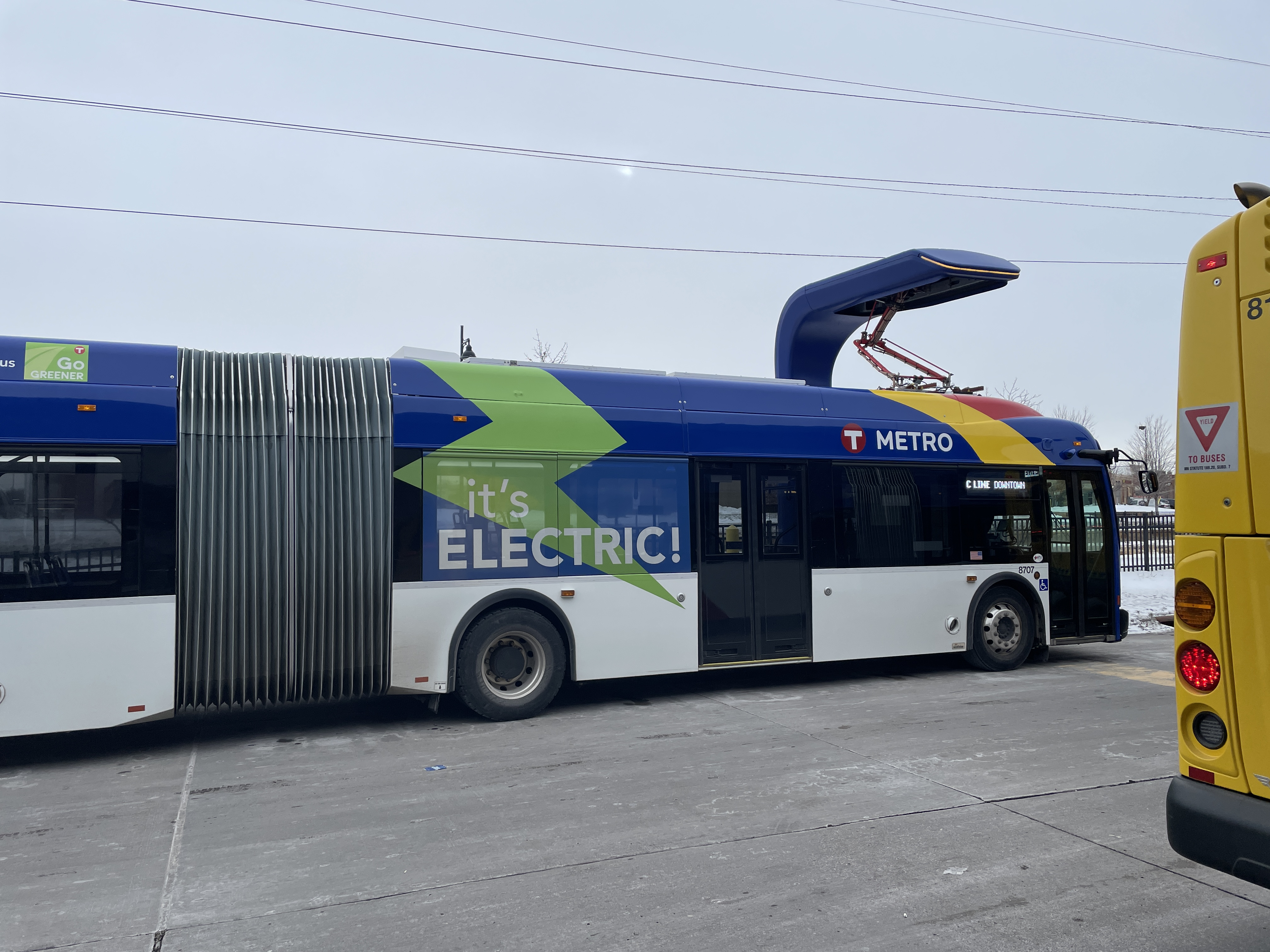
The route is expected to use some 60-foot articulated electric buses such as those on the Metro C Line.

Buses would run 90% of the time on new roads that run next to existing roads and highways. Service would be every 10 minutes during peak times and 20–30 during other times. Travel times from end to end for the 12 stations would take at least 34 minutes. Buses will operate in bus only lanes for 70% of the 10 mile long project. Construction was officially kicked off on October 19, 2022. Construction is expected to be completed and service begin in 2025.

Five of seventeen buses used on the route are expected to be 60-foot articulated electric buses. Electric buses in the Twin Cities were first used on the Metro C Line in 2019. The buses and chargers will be purchased from New Flyer for around $10.8 million. The electric buses are expected to operate nine trips a day while the diesel buses will operate 38 trips a day.

== Route ==
Metro Gold Line interactive map

== Construction ==
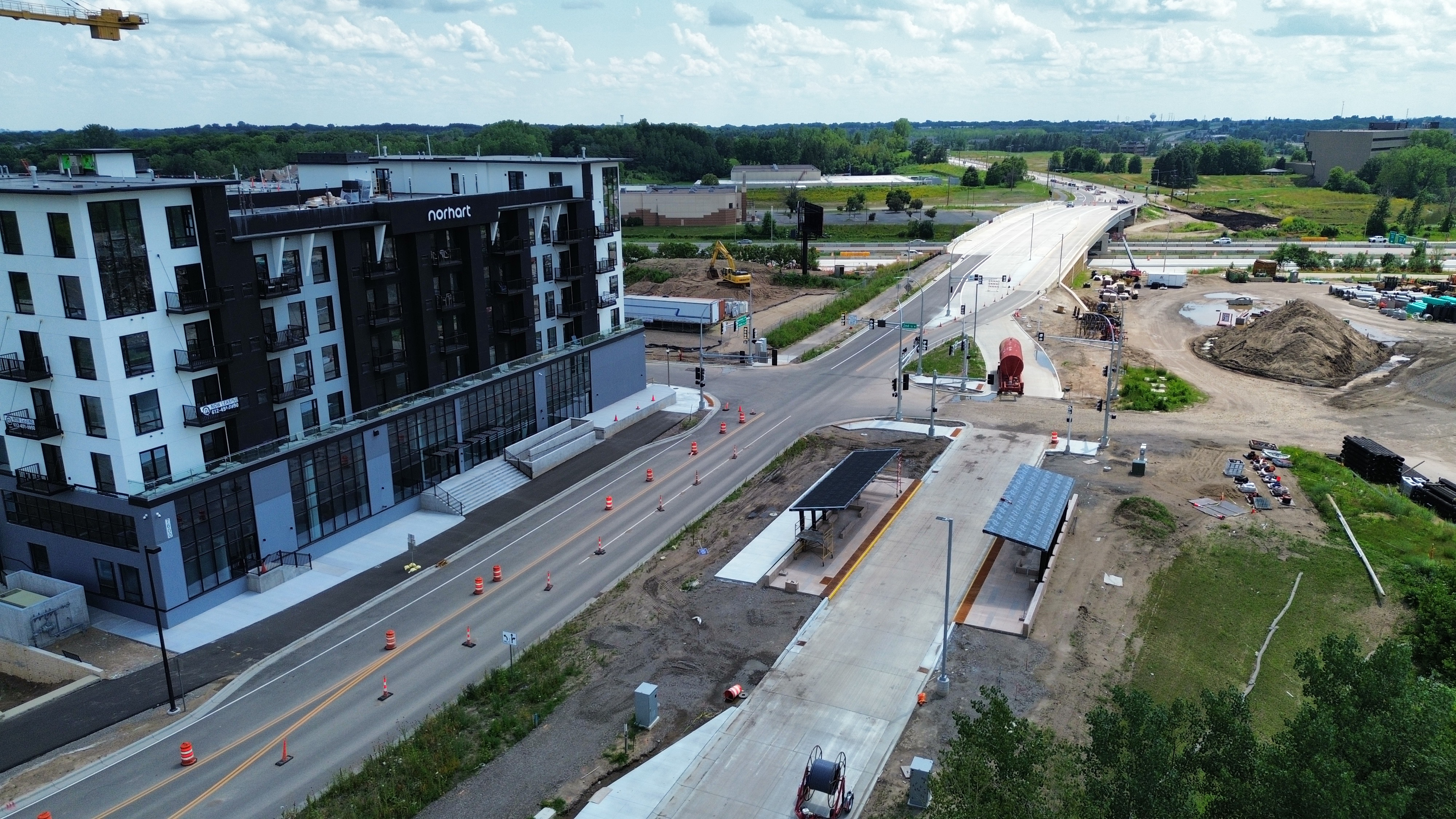
Helmo Station on the METRO Gold Line in July 2024. The new bridge across I-94 can be seen in the background.

Construction officially began in October 2022. The project is expected to cost $505 million. In April 2023, $238 million from the federal Infrastructure Investment and Jobs Act was secured. An additional $120 million from Ramsey County and Washington County will also fund the project. Major construction was expected to take place during the 2023 and 2024 construction seasons with an official opening expected in 2025. Construction on the East Side of Saint Paul concerned local business owners who experienced reduced access to their businesses and reduced customer traffic.

A new bridge over Interstate 94 opened in December 2023 at a cost of $9 million. $7.5 million of the cost was paid for by the federal government. The Bielenberg Bridge connects Helmo Ave in Oakdale and Bielenberg Drive in Woodbury. The bridge carries general traffic but will also have dedicated bus lanes for the Gold Line.

== Extension to downtown Minneapolis ==
In October 2024, Metro Transit announced that it would extend the Gold Line west from St. Paul to Downtown Minneapolis in 2027. The extension would replace existing, weekday-only express buses on I-94 between the two cities, which are also served by the Green Line, a slower light rail line. The extension is expected to cost $15 million to $20 million and would be funded in the existing project budget.

Existing BRT stations on 7th and 8th Street in downtown Minneapolis will be used and the route will end at Royalston Avenue/Farmers Market on the Green Line extension. Only two additional stations will need to be constructed. One station will be constructed on Snelling Avenue, while the other will be near U.S. Bank Stadium. Creation of the Gold Line extension will not determine the outcome of MnDOT's Rethinking I-94 project, where outcomes range from rebuilding the interstate to creating an at-grade roadway. On October 12, 2026, Metro Council announced that the extension would open on March 27, 2027.

Route 94 takes between 20 and 25 minutes to travel between downtowns while the Green Line takes 40 to 45 minutes. In 2024, Route 94 only ran every 20 minutes during rush hour with reduced frequency at other times, while the Gold Line extension will run every 10–15 minutes. Route 94 carried around 800 riders per weekday in 2024.
