= Metro (Minnesota) =

Rapid transit network in the Minneapolis metropolitan area

Coordinates: 44°59′5″N 93°16′54″W

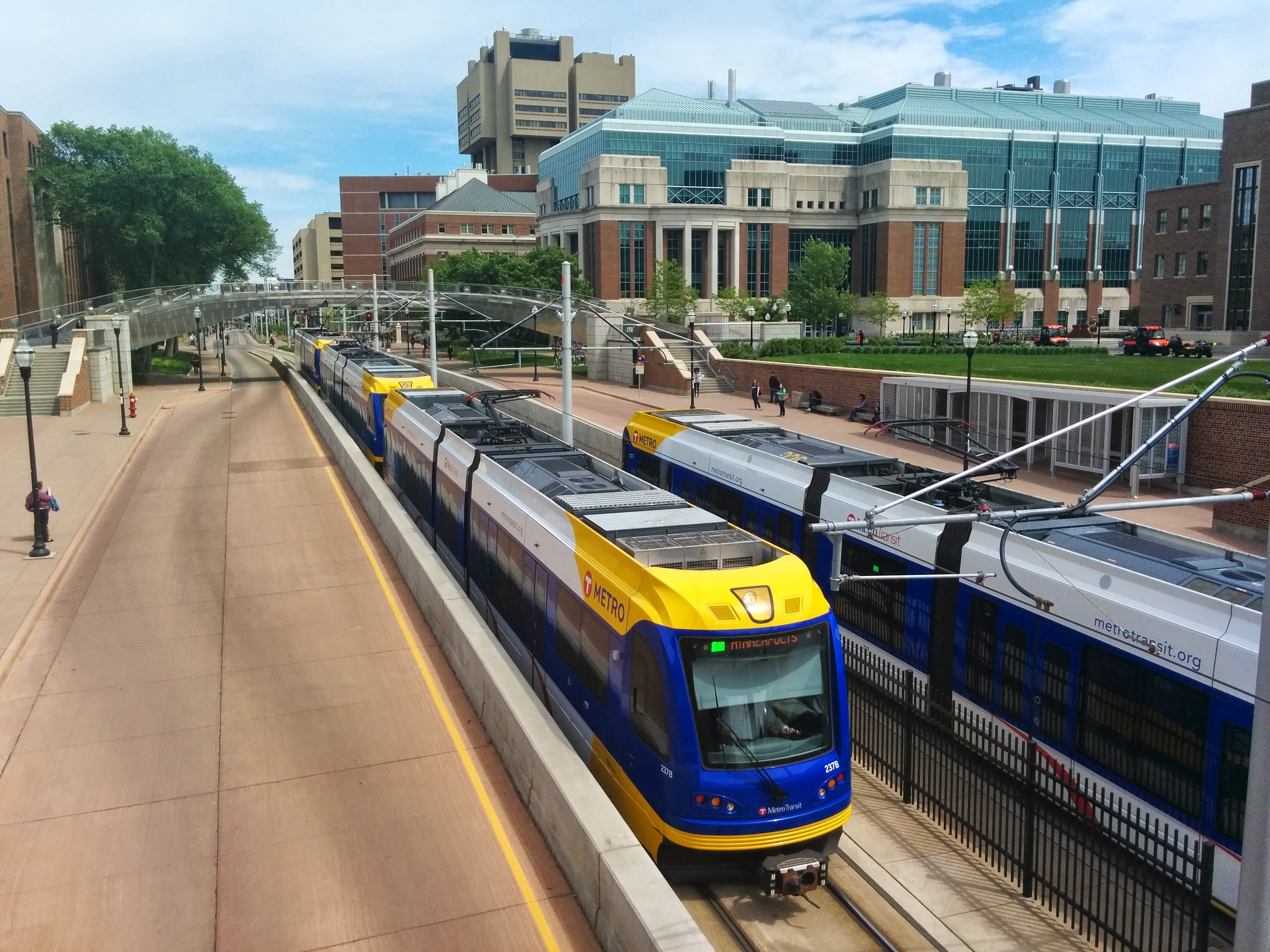
- A Minneapolis-bound train (left) passes a Saint Paul-bound train (right) on the Green Line near East Bank station.

Overview
- Owner: Metropolitan Council
- Locale: Minneapolis-St. Paul metropolitan area
- Transit type: Light rail (LRT); Bus rapid transit (BRT)
- Number of lines: 2 LRT lines 8 BRT lines
- Line number: Blue Line; Green Line; Gold Line; Orange Line; Red Line; A Line; B Line; C Line; D Line; E Line
- Number of stations: 121
- Daily ridership: 38,576 (light rail, avg. weekday 2025) 32,564 (bus rapid transit, avg. weekday 2025)
- Annual ridership: 12,848,200 (light rail, 2025)
- Website: metrotransit.org/metro

Operation
- Began operation: June 26, 2004; 22 years ago
- Operator: Metro Transit
- Number of vehicles: Bombardier Flexity Swift; Siemens S70; Siemens S700; Gillig Low Floor; New Flyer XD60; New Flyer XE60

Technical
- Track gauge: 4 ft 8 1/2 in (1,435 mm) standard gauge
System map
A geographic map of the Metro network. The official system map can be viewed on the .
System diagram

Metro (stylized as METRO) is a transit network in Minnesota serving the Minneapolis–Saint Paul metropolitan area. As of 2025, the system consists of two light rail lines (Blue and Green Lines) and eight bus rapid transit (BRT) lines (Gold, Orange, Red, A, B, C, D, and E Lines), all of which are operated by Metro Transit, a service of the region's metropolitan planning agency. The nine lines connect Minneapolis and Saint Paul with surrounding communities.

== History ==
In the 1970s, roughly contemporaneous with the construction of Washington D.C.'s Metro system and San Francisco's Bay Area Rapid Transit, the newly formed Metropolitan Council contemplated the creation of a similar mass transit for the Minneapolis-St. Paul metro area, but the idea was eventually abandoned due to opposition from the Minnesota Legislature. For the next few decades, there were repeated proposals to build light rail along several corridors, particularly the University Avenue corridor between downtown Minneapolis and Saint Paul (the present Green Line), but the idea of light rail only gained steam in the late 1990s.

In 1999, the Minnesota Legislature approved funding for the first line (the present Blue Line) along Hiawatha Avenue (initially named the Hiawatha Line) in south Minneapolis, which opened in 2004, initially just to Fort Snelling station in June, and to Mall of America station in December. In 2011, in anticipation of the opening of the Red Line and Green Line, and in order to help passengers better identify with each of the routes, Metro Transit announced that the system would be rebranded and each line assigned a unique color. The first phase of the Red Line bus rapid transit (BRT) opened in mid-2013, and the first phase of the Green Line (also known as the Central Corridor) in mid-2014.

The first arterial BRT line, the A Line, which operates along Snelling Avenue between 46th Street station at the Blue Line and Rosedale Transit Center in Roseville, and also connects to the Green Line, opened on June 11, 2016. The C Line, running on Olson Memorial Highway and Penn Avenue from downtown Minneapolis to Brooklyn Center Transit Center in the northwest suburbs, opened on June 8, 2019.

Prior to August 17, 2019, service along the entire length of the Green Line operated 24/7, the only one of 22 light rail systems in the United States to do so, but a common practice on some heavy rail lines such as the New York City Subway and PATH. The service gap from 2AM to 4AM was replaced by bus service. The current schedule on the Blue Line sees the first departure at 3:19AM and the last arrival at 12:50AM. On the Green Line, the first departure is at 4:29AM and the last arrival is at 12:10AM. Metro Transit also provides a shuttle service between the stations serving Terminal 1 (Lindbergh) and Terminal 2 (Humphrey) of Minneapolis–Saint Paul International Airport during the overnight service gap on the Blue Line.

The Orange Line, which connects Burnsville to downtown Minneapolis via Interstate 35W, with stops in Bloomington, Richfield, and south Minneapolis, opened on December 4, 2021. The D Line, running between the Mall of America and Brooklyn Center Transit Center via downtown Minneapolis via Chicago and Fremont Avenues, opened on December 3, 2022. The Gold Line, which is the system's first BRT line operating primarily on exclusive lanes, opened on March 22, 2025, and connects communities between downtown Saint Paul and Woodbury along the Interstate 94 corridor. The B Line, serving the Selby-Lake corridor between Minneapolis and downtown Saint Paul, opened on June 14, 2025. The E Line, connecting Southdale and Westgate via Downtown Minneapolis and the University of Minnesota, opened December 6, 2025.

== Current system ==
=== Lines ===
Light rail:

- Blue Line: Target Field Station – Minneapolis-St. Paul International Airport – Mall of America
- Green Line: Target Field Station – University of Minnesota – Union Depot

Bus rapid transit (BRT):

- Gold Line: Union Depot – Woodlane Park & Ride
- Orange Line: Downtown Minneapolis – Burnsville Heart of the City
- Red Line: Mall of America – Apple Valley Transit Station
- A Line: 46th Street station – Rosedale Transit Center
- B Line: Lake & France – Union Depot
- C Line: Downtown Minneapolis – Brooklyn Center Transit Center
- D Line: Mall of America – Downtown Minneapolis – Brooklyn Center Transit Center
- E Line: Southdale – Downtown Minneapolis – Westgate

The current Metro system consists of 10 lines. There are two light rail lines: the Blue Line, which runs from Target Field in downtown Minneapolis to Minneapolis-St Paul International Airport and the Mall of America, and the Green Line, which runs from Target Field through the University of Minnesota to Union Depot in downtown Saint Paul. Bus rapid transit (BRT) lines named for a color operate primarily on freeways and bus-only guideways, including the Red Line, which serves as an southward extension of the Blue Line across along Cedar Avenue where it connects with southern suburbs at four different stations, and the Orange Line, which runs along Interstate 35W from downtown Minneapolis south into Richfield, Bloomington and Burnsville. In addition, the Gold Line, operates primarily on a dedicated transitway parallel to Interstate 94, the region's first BRT route to do so. Finally, the six arterial BRT lines, named with letters, serve various corridors throughout the metro and operate in mixed traffic, with transit advantages such as transit signal priority and bus lanes. The A, B, C, D, and E Lines function as upgrades to existing local bus routes and connect with other Metro lines at certain shared stations.

The main hub of the system is downtown Minneapolis, which is served by the Blue, Green, Orange, C, D, and E Lines, with future connections planned for the Gold, F, H, and K Lines. Mall of America station is also a hub, served by the Blue, Red, and D Lines, with planned service through the J Line. Saint Paul Union Depot is envisioned as an additional future hub, currently connecting to the Green, Gold, and B Lines and the Bronze and G Lines in the future.

Most trains and buses run at least every 15 minutes throughout the day, with reduced schedules at night and on weekends, and have transit advantages such as bus lanes and transit signal priority. All routes feature enhanced station amenities such as heating, pay-at-the-station boarding, and electronic NexTrip displays that show predicted real-time departure information. Predicted real-time departure information and route planning is also available through Metro Transit's website.

== Fares ==
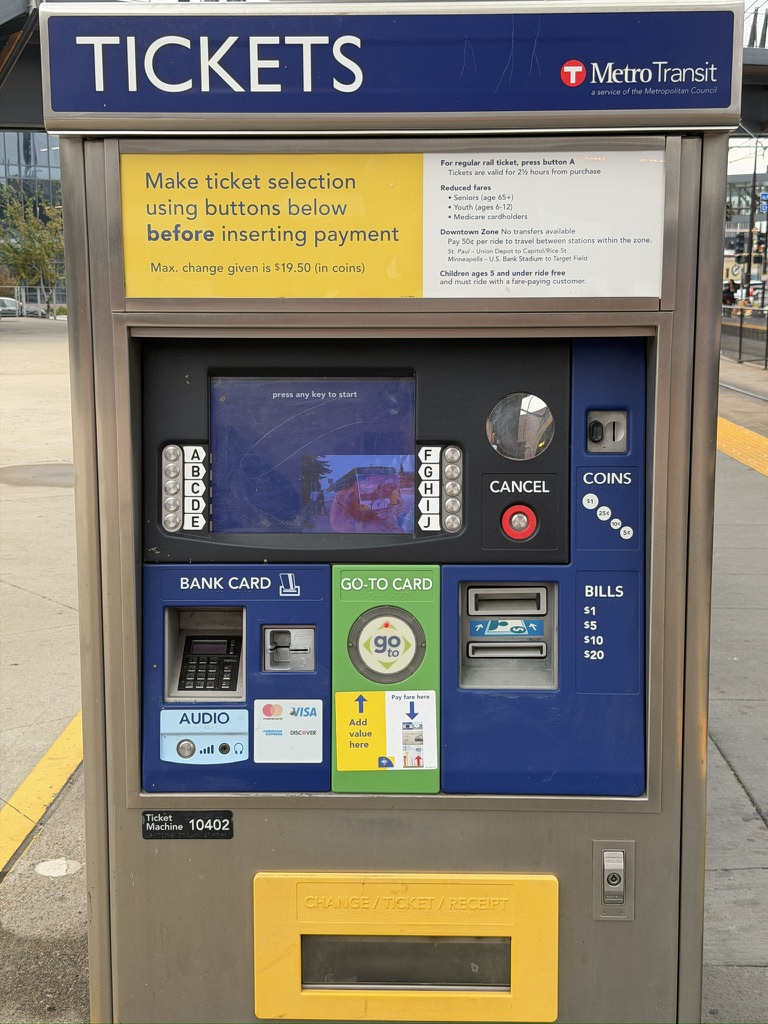
METRO ticket kiosk in 2025.

Metro uses a proof-of-payment system, requiring riders to carry tickets at all times. Fares are purchased before boarding, either at ticket machines located in the stations or by scanning a Go-To card at dedicated terminals. Tickets are valid for 2 1/2 hours after purchase. An unlimited number of transfers between Metro lines and Metro Transit bus routes within the same fare level are allowed within this period. Within the two Downtown Zones of Minneapolis and St. Paul, tickets are 50¢, but do not allow transfers. Certain buses operating on Nicollet Mall are marked as Free Ride. Otherwise, standard fares apply.

- Adults: $2
- Youth (ages 6-12), Seniors (ages 65+) and Medicare card holders: $1
- Persons with disabilities: $1 (Regular and express)
- Children under 5: Free with paying rider. Limit is 3.
- Express Bus: $3.25 rush hour, $2.50 otherwise ($1/$3.25 for youth, seniors, and Medicare card holders)

(Rush hour is classified as Monday - Friday, 6-9 am & 3-6:30 pm)

In addition, all-day passes are sold. Passes for various lengths of time or numbers of trips at also available to be loaded onto Go-To cards.

All University of Minnesota undergraduate and graduate students (that pay the Transportation and Safety fee) are provided a Universal Transit Pass through their U-Cards. This allows Student-IDs to be used for unlimited rides on all regular route transit busses, Light Rail and Bus Rapid Transit. Staff at the Twin Cities Campus may be eligible for a Metropass, this pass allows all the same benefits as the Universal Transit Pass. As of January 2023, cost of this pass is $83 per month. This will reach a break even point after between 26 and 33 trips per month.

Passengers at Minneapolis-St Paul International Airport can use the Blue Line between the Terminal 1-Lindbergh station and Terminal 2–Humphrey station free of charge. These two stations are served 24/7.

== Future ==
Several expansion projects are planned for the Metro system, at various stages of completion. These include both light rail extensions and bus rapid transit services.

=== Under construction ===
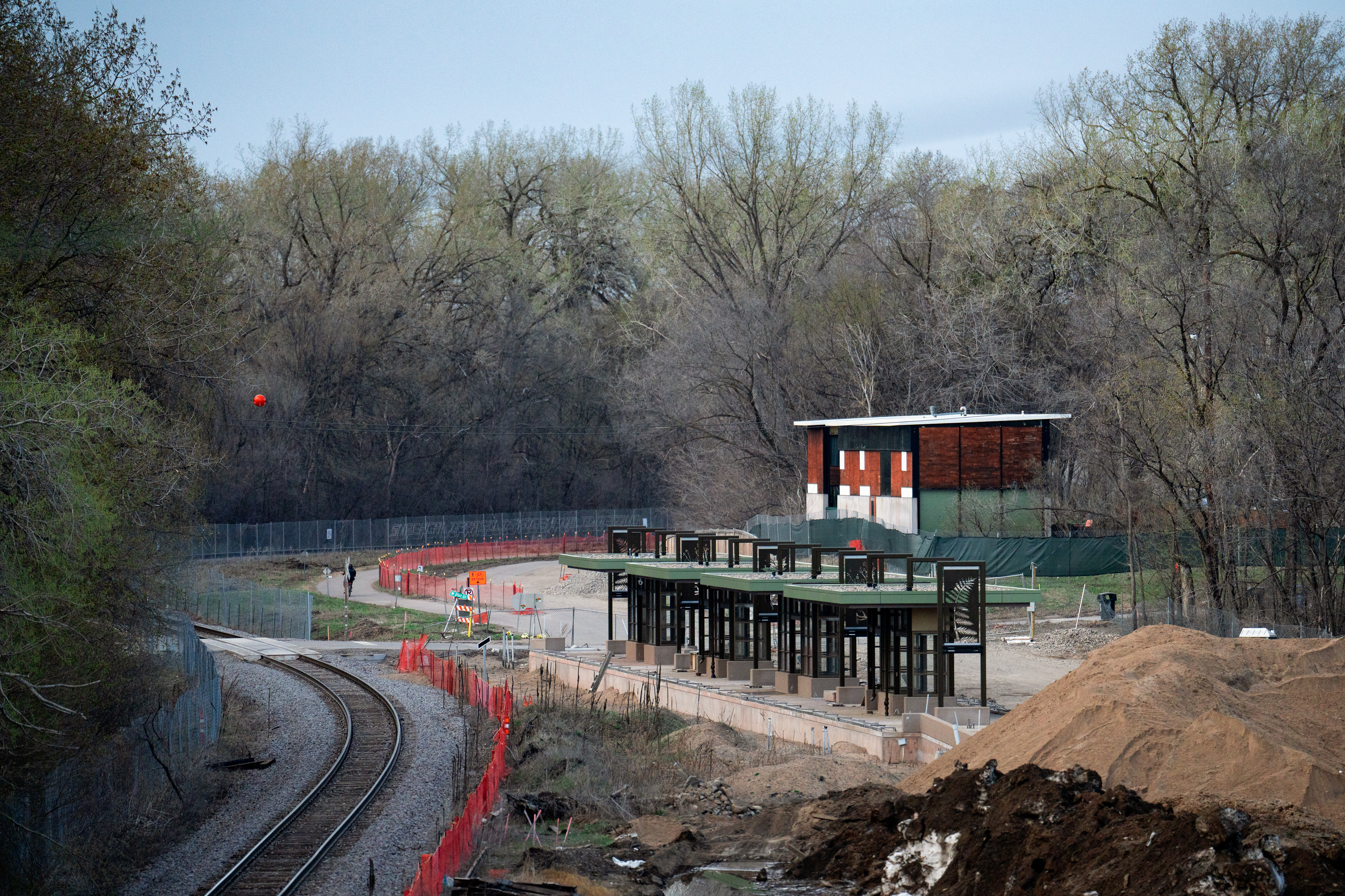
Construction of the future West 21st Street Station on the Green Line.

The Green Line extension is an under construction expansion of the Green Line, running from Target Field Station to the southwestern suburbs of St. Louis Park, Hopkins, Minnetonka, and Eden Prairie, terminating at SouthWest Station. The project was given federal approval in November 2018, and ground was broken on construction on November 30, 2018. Completion of the project is expected in 2027, at an expected cost of over US$2 billion. It will be the largest infrastructure project in state history.

An extension of the Gold Line is under construction, which will connect the route to downtown Minneapolis via Interstate 94 with an anticipated opening in 2027. It will replace the existing Route 94 and primarily travel on existing shoulders with a stop at Snelling Avenue to connect to the A Line.

=== Planned projects ===
The Metro Blue Line Extension is a planned extension of the Blue Line to Brooklyn Park. After failing to come to an agreement with BNSF over co-locating light rail and freight trains in the railroad's corridor, the Metropolitan Council announced they would begin to "explore opportunities to advance this critical project without using BNSF Railway right of way." New alignments for the southern portion of route were presented for public comment in March 2021 and it was determined that the Blue Line extension will primarily run along Bottineau Boulevard (County Road 81).

The Bronze Line, formerly known as the Purple Line and the Rush Line Corridor, is a planned bus rapid transit route that will run between downtown Saint Paul and the Maplewood Mall Transit Center in Maplewood. As the Purple Line, the project was proposed to run predominantly on the Ramsey County Regional Railroad Authority corridor adjacent to the Bruce Vento Regional Trail from downtown Saint Paul to downtown White Bear Lake. However, this route was eliminated in favor of studying an alignment along White Bear Avenue terminating somewhere in Maplewood as the White Bear Lake City Council passed a resolution requesting that the route not enter their city in March 2022. In October 2024, the Maplewood City Council also withdrew its support for the Purple Line. In December 2025, Metro Transit announced the Bronze Line as a reimagined version of the Purple Line, roughly following the White Bear Avenue alignment.

The F Line is an arterial bus rapid transit route undergoing planning that will run between downtown Minneapolis and Northtown Transit Center in Blaine. It will run mostly along Central and University Avenues (existing Route 10). Construction was originally anticipated for 2025, but has been moved to 2028 to align with roadway improvements by the Minnesota Department of Transportation (MnDOT).

The G Line is a planned arterial bus rapid transit route operating between West St. Paul and Little Canada via downtown Saint Paul. The line will run on Rice Street north of downtown and mostly on Robert Street south of downtown (existing Routes 62 and 68). Engineering is slated to be complete by 2026, while the route itself will be constructed and opened in two phases to align with planned construction on Robert Street. The first segment is between Little Canada Transit Station and downtown, and will be constructed in 2026 and 2027. The second, southern segment to Dakota County Northern Service Center is set to be built by the end of 2028.

The H Line is a planned arterial bus rapid transit route that will serve Como and Maryland Avenues, where Route 3 currently operates. It will run between downtown Minneapolis and Sun Ray Transit Center, where it will connect with the Gold Line. The project is currently in planning and will undergo station design work in 2026 and 2027.

In early 2026, Metro Transit announced that the Riverview and Nicollet Corridors had been selected as the future J and K Lines, respectively. In addition, the announcement stated that the Metro L Line would be selected from the three top lines of the study: Grand-Franklin-East 3rd, Randolph-West 7th, or Johnson-Lyndale. The J, K, and L Lines are expected to be built between 2030 and 2035.

=== Proposed projects ===
There are also numerous proposals in early planning stages, including Highway 169 between northern Scott County and downtown Minneapolis, Highway 55 between Plymouth and Golden Valley and downtown Minneapolis, an extension of the Orange Line to Burnsville Center (led by Dakota County), infill stations and an extension of the Red Line, rail along the Midtown Greenway corridor, Red Rock Corridor Highway BRT on Highway 61 between Saint Paul and Hastings, West Broadway Modern Streetcar, Interstate 35W between downtown Minneapolis and Blaine, Highway 36 (led by Washington County), bus rapid transit as a part of MnDOT's Rethinking I-94 study, County Road 42 between Shakopee and Rosemount (led by the Minnesota Valley Transit Authority) and American Boulevard (led by the City of Bloomington).

== Operations ==
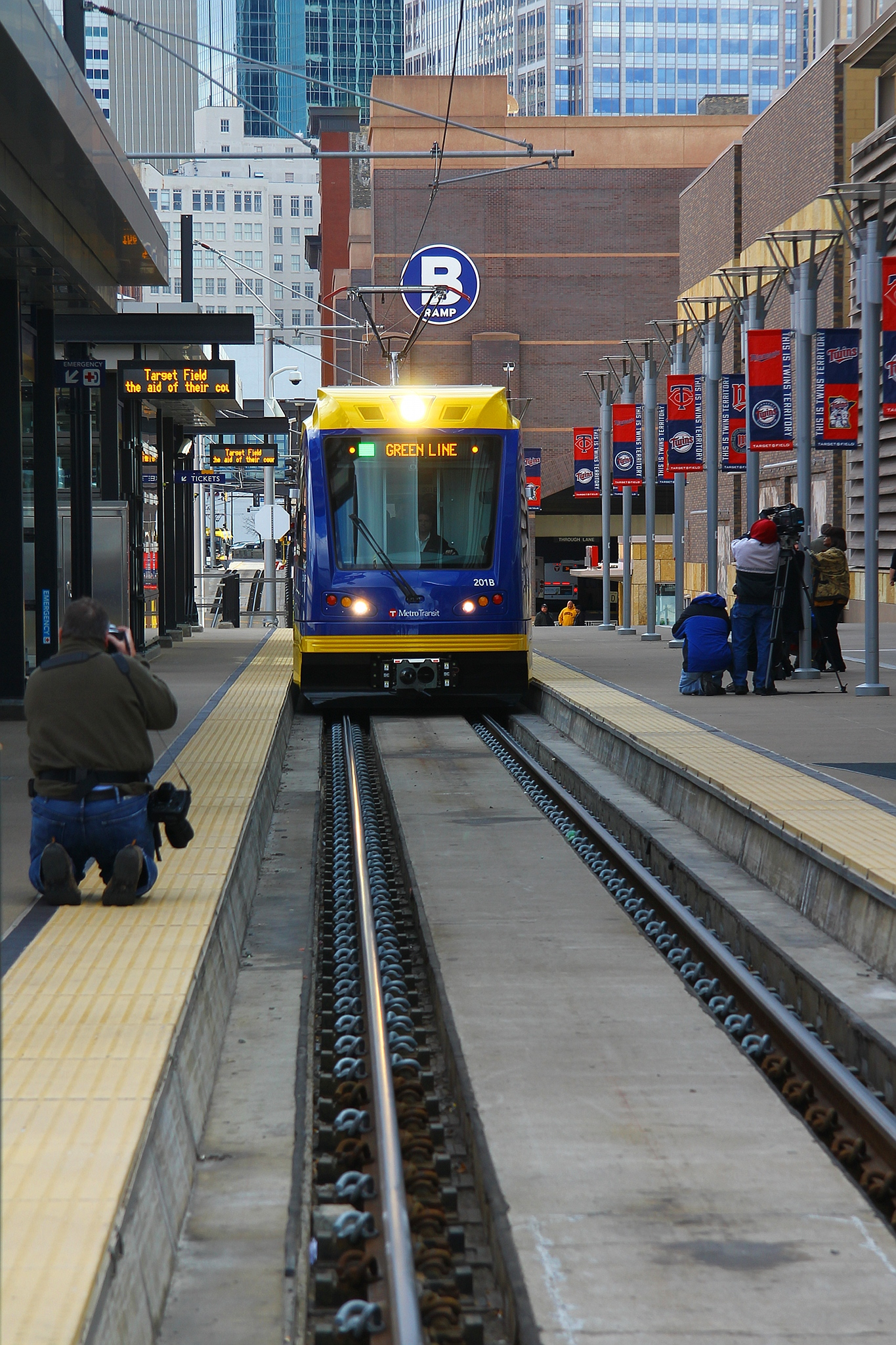
The first Type II LRV arrives at a media event on October 10, 2012, displaying "Green Line" on the destination board.

The Metro system's rail lines use a combination of exclusive and shared right-of-way, depending on the circumstances. Within the two Downtown Zones, trains run on surface streets in an exclusive right-of-way, without preemption. The Blue Line runs primarily alongside Hiawatha Avenue (Minnesota State Highway 55), along land originally acquired for expansion of that highway, except for a brief stretch in a tunnel underneath Minneapolis-St Paul International Airport. The Green Line runs along the median of University Avenue in an exclusive right-of-way, except for a brief stretch of the Washington Avenue Transit Mall where its tracks are shared with buses. The Blue Line's at-grade crossings are protected by automated grade crossing gates; the Green Line's crossings move in regular traffic, with signal priority but no preemption.

Since the completion of three-car station extensions in winter 2010, Metro Transit operates one-, two- and three-car trains on the Blue Line, depending on the time of day and ridership needs. Many stations on the line were initially built to be capable of serving only one- or two-car trains, as a cost-saving measure; all of the shorter platforms were designed and built with future extension in mind and currently all stations are capable of serving three-car trains. The Green Line was built with three-car platforms at all stations.

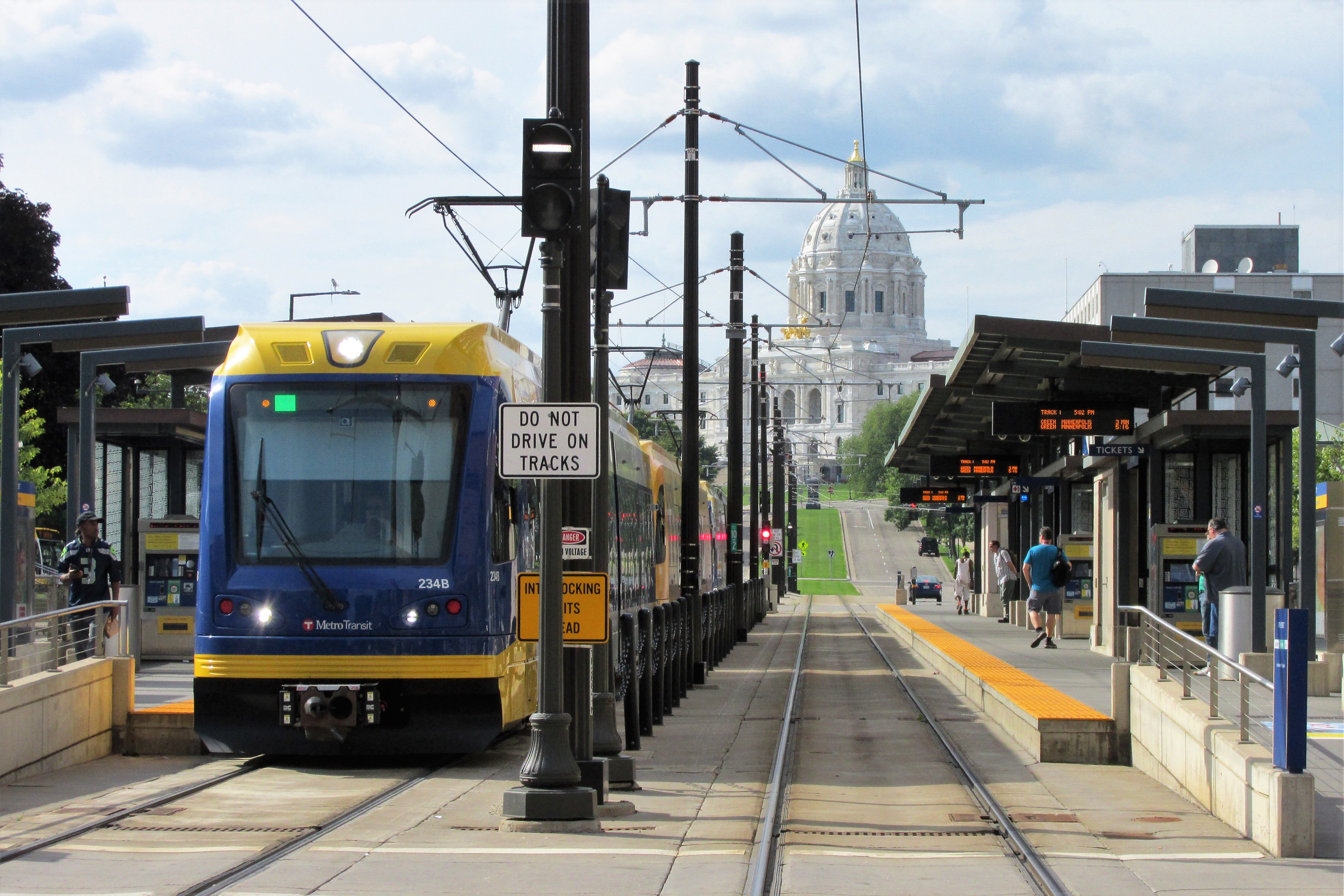
Green Line LRT at the Capital-Rice station.

=== Rolling stock ===
Currently three models of LRVs run in the Metro system.

Type I LRVs are Bombardier Flexity Swifts, utilizing a low floor for accessible boarding at all stations. Metro Transit operates 27 vehicles on the lines, numbered 101 through 127. Initially painted with Metro Transit livery, all have been repainted as of 2015 to reflect the Metro system branding. During this time, Type I cars also were retrofitted with colored LCD headboards for route destination displays and other improvements.

Type II LRVs are Siemens S70/Avantos. 64 vehicles were purchased, primarily to serve the Green Line. Type II LRVs are mechanically, but not electronically, compatible with the current fleet of 27 "type I" vehicles, so while the two generations do run on the tracks at the same time and both types are able to push a malfunctioning unit of the other type, multiple-unit consists may only be assembled of one type.

Type III LRVS are Siemens S700. In 2016, Metro Transit placed an order for 27 more Siemens S70 LRVs for its planned Southwest Corridor expansion. The cars in this order were considered to be model S70 at the time the order was placed, but in 2019/20 were retroactively rebranded as model S700 by Siemens. These used a modified center-truck design that allowed sideways-facing seating in the center section, for better passenger flow. In 2018, Siemens adopted a new model number, S700, for S70 LRVs that used the new center-section design, and in 2020 it retroactively applied the new designation to all previous S70 LRVs built to the new design; as a result, all of Metro Transit's type III LRVs (301–327) are now Siemens model S700. The first two S700 vehicles arrived in May 2020.

== Map ==
As of 2022

== See also ==
- Northstar Line
- Metro Transit (Minnesota)
- Minneapolis Streetcar System
- List of tram and light rail transit systems
- List of United States light rail systems by ridership
- List of North American light rail systems by ridership
