= Metro F Line (Minnesota) =

Planned bus rapid transit line

Overview
- System: Metro
- Operator: Metro Transit
- Status: In engineering
- Predecessors: Route 10

Route
- Route type: Bus rapid transit
- Locale: (Hennepin County); Minneapolis, Minnesota; Columbia Heights, Minnesota; Hilltop, Minnesota; Fridley, Minnesota; Spring Lake Park, Minnesota; Blaine, Minnesota
- Start: Downtown Minneapolis
- Via: Central and University Avenues
- End: Northtown Transit Center, Blaine
- Length: 13 miles (21 km)
- Stations: 32

The METRO F Line is a planned bus rapid transit (BRT) line operated by Metro Transit in Minneapolis–Saint Paul. It will run from Northtown Transit Center at Northtown Mall in Blaine southward to downtown Minneapolis, primarily on Central and University Avenues, where Route 10 currently operates. It will be the sixth arterial BRT lines in the Metro system. Construction was originally anticipated for 2025, but has been moved to 2028 to align with roadway improvements by the Minnesota Department of Transportation (MnDOT). It will connect to numerous local bus routes along its route, as well as several other BRT and light rail lines in downtown Minneapolis.

According to Metro Transit, more than half of the riders Route 10, which the F Line will largely replace, are people of color. One-fifth have a disability and 80% have less than $60,000 in annual income. Route 10's annual ridership is estimated at 11,000 daily trips. The F Line line will serve approximately 160,800 jobs. It will operate at 10-minute headways throughout most of the day, with reduced service in the early morning and late night.

== See also ==
- Metro Transit (Minnesota)
- Metro (Minnesota)
- Metro C Line
- Bus rapid transit
