= Minneapolis Streetcar System =

Overview
- Locale: Minneapolis, Minnesota
- Transit type: Streetcar
- Number of lines: 5

The Minneapolis Streetcar System was a proposed streetcar system for the city of Minneapolis, Minnesota. Extensive studies and plans for the new system were completed in 2007 and presented to the Minneapolis City Council in January 2008; on April 2, 2010, the Council voted to approve the plans and seek funding. On December 21, 2010 the Federal Transit Administration granted $900,000 to further study the Nicollet and Central Avenue corridors. In June 2021, after no further development on the system, a bill authorized the Metropolitan Council to use funds collected for the Nicollet-Central line to be spent on bus rapid transit funding.

== Streetcar vs Light rail ==
Based on similar federal funded streetcar programs in the USA (mainly Portland, Oregon) streetcars are rarely separated from other traffic and are not given traffic-signal priority over other vehicles (like Light rail), except in a few situations to allow the rail cars—which cannot turn as sharply as most other motor vehicles—to make some turns. In Portland, using this "mixed traffic" operation has reduced the cost of constructing each segment and—by not closing traffic lanes permanently to other traffic, as is typically done with light rail—also minimized disruption to traffic flow, and allows curbside parking to be retained, but also means slower operating speeds compared to light rail. Additional factors making the Portland Streetcar line less expensive to build per mile than light rail are that use of city streets largely eliminated the need to acquire private property for portions of the right-of-way, as has been necessary for the region's light rail lines, and that the vehicles' smaller size and therefore lighter weight has enabled the use of a "shallower track slab". The latter means that construction of the trackway necessitated excavating to a depth of only 12.2 inches (310 mm) instead of the conventional (for light rail) depth of around 18.3 inches (460 mm), significantly reducing the extent to which previously existing underground utilities had to be relocated to accommodate the trackway.

== Vehicles ==
Each Portland streetcar is 66 feet (20.12 m) long, whereas light rail cars are typically 80 to 95 feet (24.38 to 28.96 m) long (Portland's Lightrail are between 80 and 95 feet (24.38 and 28.96 m). long) and streetcars are operated as single cars at all times, never coupled into trains. The shorter cars keeps station construction expense lower than would be the case for a light-rail station, but the smaller cars do not provide equal carrying capacity as that of a light-rail train. A single articulated Portland streetcar is only about one-third the length of a two-car Lightrail Trains. It can be assumed that the Minneapolis streetcars would follow similar design standards or acquire ex-Twin City Rapid Transit PCC streetcars from Newark City Subway.

Examples of Portland streetcars:

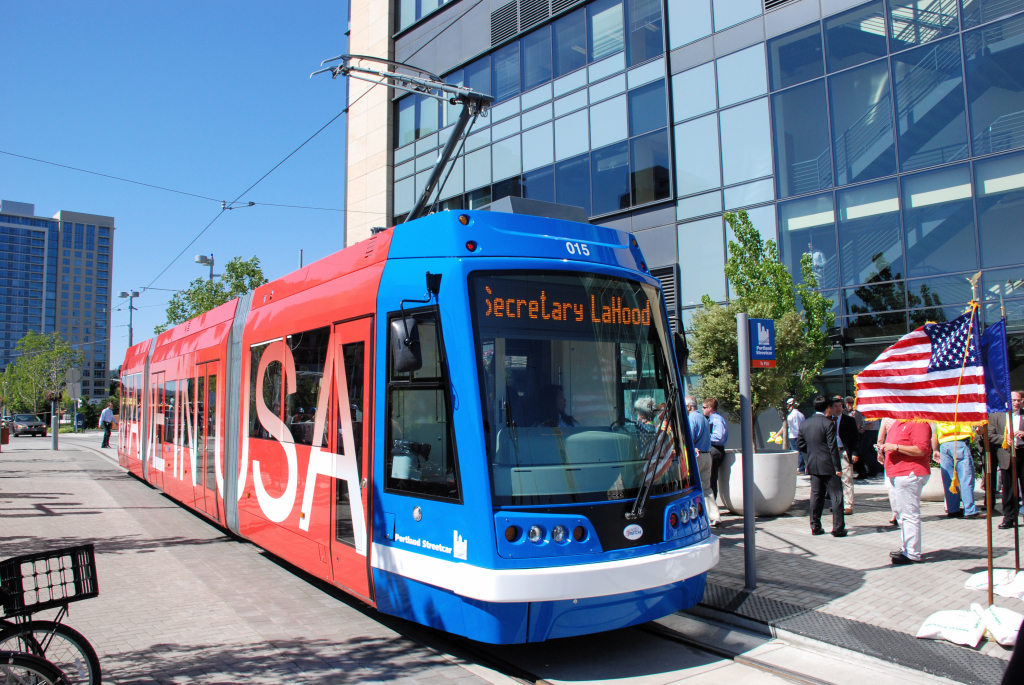
United Streetcar 10T3 prototype for Portland. United Streetcar dissolved in 2015.

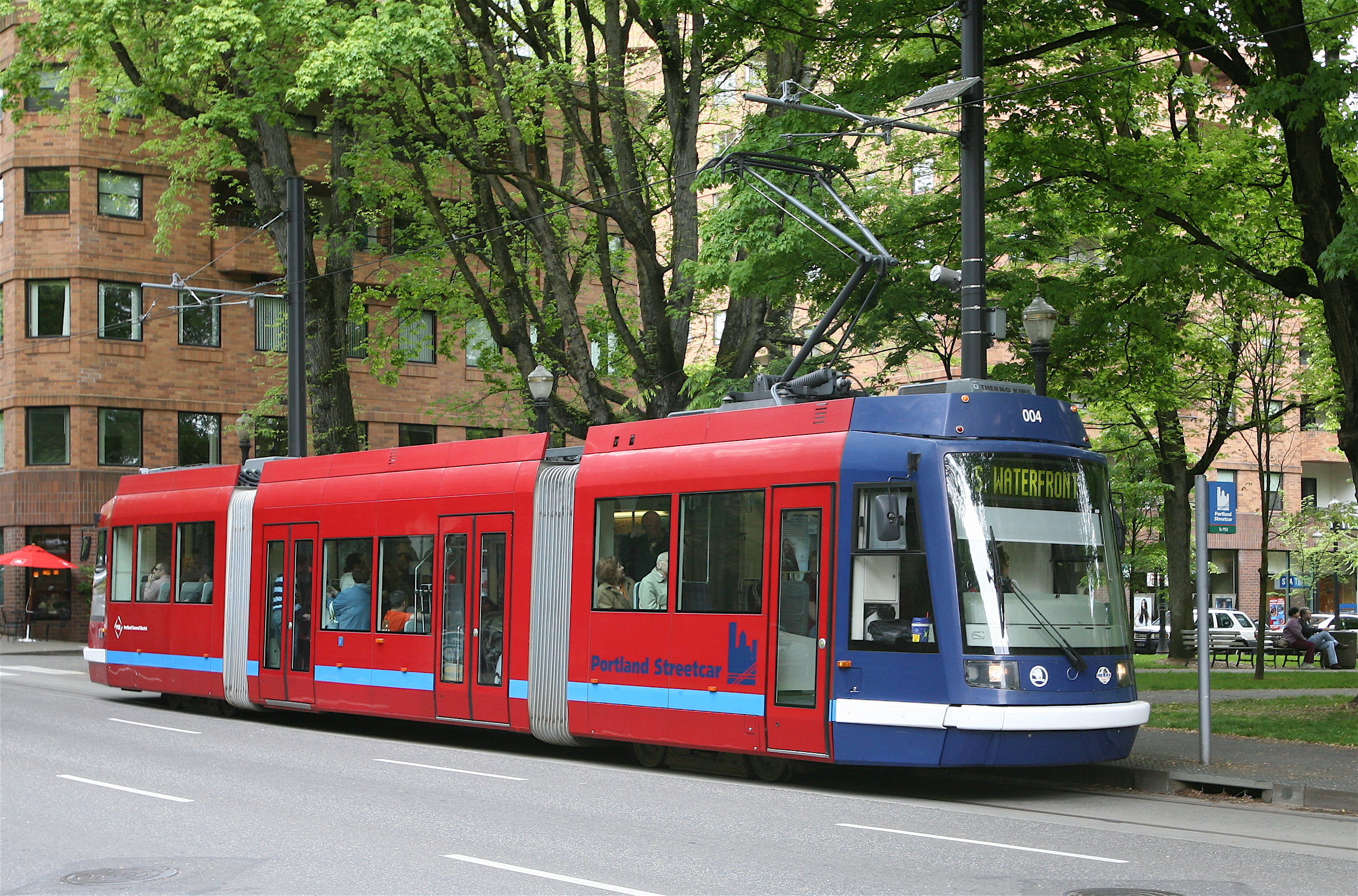
Škoda 10 T in Portland

== Proposed fares ==
The streetcars would cost either as much as Metro light rail ($2.00) or slightly less due to slower travel speeds ($2.05 all day-like Portland). Discounted fares for disabled riders and veterans would also apply. Ticket boxes would be the same ones used at Metro light rail and Northstar Commuter Rail stations, and would accept day, event 6 hour, metro, U, college, and student passes, as well as super savers.

Use of Nextrip signs would also be used at the stations, to allow riders to determine the time of the next arriving train or bus at the station. The streetcars would be operated by Metro Transit, a division of the Metropolitan Council.

== Lines ==
The current plans include five lines, which with the exception of the Midtown Greenway line follow former Twin City Rapid Transit streetcar routes that were removed in the early 1950s.

It appears that the Nicollet Ave/Central Ave Line would be the first line to be built, due to its importance in helping revitalize both Northeast and South Minneapolis

=== Nicollet Avenue/Central Avenue Line ===
This line would run along Nicollet Avenue, Nicollet Mall and Central Avenue NE (Minnesota State Highway 65) from 46th Street South through Downtown Minneapolis (connecting to the Metro Blue and Green lines at Nicollet Mall Station) to the Columbia Heights Transit Center in Columbia Heights, Minnesota. The line would cross the Mississippi River via the Third Avenue Bridge. There is an at-grade railroad crossing at 36th Avenue NE that would have to be altered to ensure steady traffic flow for the streetcars. Other than the railroad crossing, there are no major construction or engineering issues along the corridor.

The total length of the line would be 9.6 miles (15.4 km). The cost of track for the line would be approximately $185 million. Ridership estimates for the line are around 14,500 to 17,500 weekday riders. Compared to the 30,500 riders per weekday on the 12.3 mile Blue Line from Target Field in Downtown Minneapolis to Mall of America. Travel time from the I-35W & 46th St. Bus Rapid Transit (BRT) Station to the Columbia Heights Transit Center would be approximately 35 minutes.

The route follows the northern leg of TCRT's Bloomington–Columbia Heights line and southern leg of TCRT's Nicollet–Northwest line.

=== Midtown Greenway/Lake Street Line ===
This line would run along Lake Street between St. Louis Park & Hiawatha Avenue, connecting the future proposed Metro Green Line Extension, Metro Blue Line and several major housing sites together.

Although TCRT streetcars never ran along the rail corridor that is now the Midtown Greenway, the Minneapolis leg of the Selby-Lake line ran one block south on Lake Street.

=== Hennepin Avenue/University/4th Street Line ===
This line would run from downtown along Hennepin Avenue from the Uptown Transit Center through Downtown Minneapolis (connecting with the Metro Blue and Green lines at Warehouse District / Hennepin Avenue Station) to University Avenue, continuing east to Oak Street. The line would cross the Mississippi River on the Hennepin Avenue Bridge.

The line would be 3.9 miles (6.3 km) long. The track would cost approximately $80 million. Ridership estimates for the line are approximately 9,500 to 12,000 weekday riders.

The route follows the TCRT's Oak–Harriet line.

=== Broadway/Washington Avenue Line ===
This line would run along West Broadway (Hennepin County Road 81) and Washington Avenue from the Robbinsdale Transit Center to Nicollet Mall in Downtown Minneapolis.

The line would be 11.4 miles (18.3 km) long. The track would cost approximately $135 million. Estimated ridership for the line would be approximately 4,500 to 5,500 weekday riders.

The route follows TCRT's 28th Ave–Robbinsdale line.

=== Chicago Avenue Line ===
This line would run along Chicago Avenue from 38th Street South to Nicollet Mall in Downtown Minneapolis via 9th and 10th streets. The line would then run along Nicollet Mall to 5th Street. It would terminate at Nicollet Mall Station on the Metro Blue and Green lines.

The line would be 3 miles (4.8 km) long. The cost of track for the line would be approximately $80 million. Ridership estimates for this line are approximately 11,000 to 13,000 riders on weekdays.

The route follows the southern leg of TCRT's Chicago–Penn line.
