= Metro G Line (Minnesota) =

Planned bus rapid transit line

Overview
- System: Metro
- Operator: Metro Transit
- Vehicle: Gillig Low Floor BRT Plus
- Status: In planning and engineering
- Predecessors: Route 62 and Route 68

Route
- Locale: (Ramsey County); Little Canada, Minnesota; Roseville, Minnesota; Saint Paul, Minnesota (Dakota County); West Saint Paul, Minnesota
- Start: Little Canada Transit Center
- Via: Rice and Robert Streets
- End: Dakota County Northern Service Center
- Length: 11.5 mi (18.5 km)
- Stations: 30

The Metro G Line, previously known as the Robert Street Corridor, is a proposed bus rapid transit (BRT) corridor, from Little Canada to West Saint Paul via downtown Saint Paul on Rice and Robert Streets. Robert Street is named after Captain Louis Robert, an early resident of Saint Paul. The corridor's population is expected to grow 45% and 27% more jobs are expected to come to the area from 2000 to 2030. In the 2006 state bonding bill, $500,000 was set aside to study the feasibility of adding mass transit. Robert Street, the south portion of the corridor, was also studied for light rail improvements. Robert Street was one of nine arterial streets recommended for BRT by the Metropolitan Council's 2030 Transportation Policy Plan. Six of the nine corridors were to be built by 2020 and the remaining three would be built by 2030. In February 2021, the corridor was selected to be implemented as the G Line.

Engineering is slated to be complete by 2026, while the route itself will be constructed and opened in two phases to align with planned construction on Robert Street. The first segment is between Little Canada Transit Station and downtown, and will be constructed in 2026 and 2027. The second, southern segment to Dakota County Northern Service Center is set to be built by the end of 2028.

== See also ==
- Metro A Line
- Metro C Line
- Robert Street (Metro Transit station)
- Robert Street Bridge
