= Royalston Avenue/Farmers Market and 7th Street & Olson/5th Avenue station =

Light rail and bus rapid transit station in Minneapolis, Minnesota

Royalston Ave/Farmers Market 7th St & Olson/5th Ave
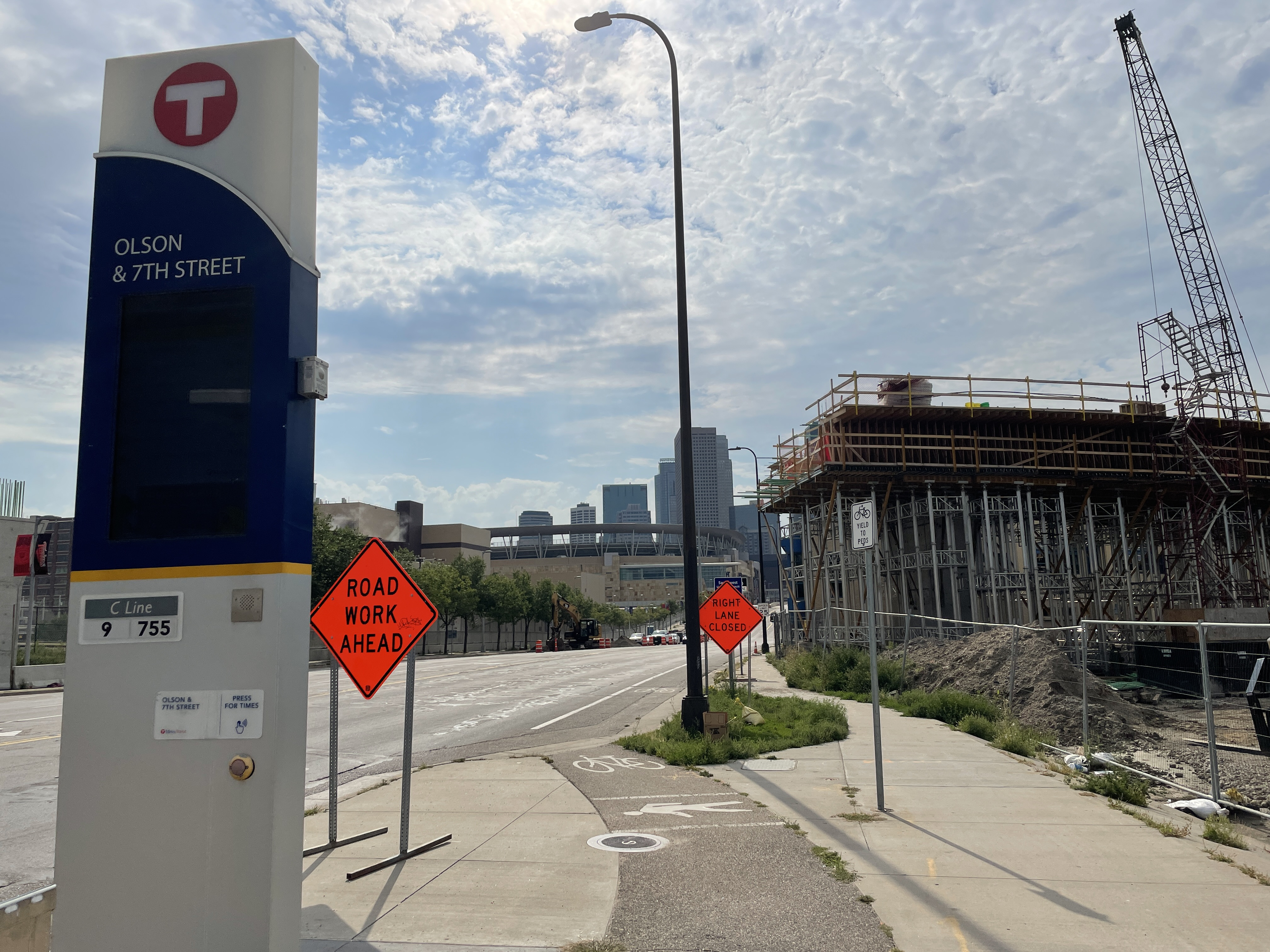

General information
- Coordinates: 44.981297°N 93.282990°W
- Owner: Metro Transit; Metropolitan Council
- Lines: Green Line Extension (2027); C Line; D Line
- Platforms: Side platform (LRT); Split side platform (BRT)
- Tracks: 2
- Connections: 5, 19, 22, 755

Construction
- Parking: No
- Cycle facilities: Yes
- Accessible: Yes

History
- Opened: June 8, 2019 (BRT)
- Former names: Olson & 7th Street (2016–2022)

Services
Preceding station	Metro	Following station
Royalston Avenue/Farmers Market
Bassett Creek Valley toward SouthWest Station	Green Line Extension (2027)	Target Field continues as Green Line toward Union Depot
7th Street & Olson/5th
Olson & Bryant toward Brooklyn Center	C Line	Ramp A/7th Street Transit Center toward 7th-8th Street & Park
7th Street & Bryant toward Brooklyn Center	D Line	Ramp A/7th Street Transit Center toward Mall of America
Location

Royalston Avenue/Farmers Market (Royalston) and 7th Street & Olson/5th Avenue is a Metro station in Minneapolis, Minnesota. The light rail (LRT) stop, Royalston, is under construction as part of the Metro Green Line Extension, anticipated to open 2027. The bus rapid transit (BRT) stop, 7th Street & Olson/5th Avenue, is served by the C Line and D Line.

The station is located in Minneapolis's North Loop neighborhood, and provides access to the Minneapolis Farmers Market and the Metro Transit Campus, the eponymous agency's headquarters. The station is positioned east of I-94 and north of I-394.

== History ==
The C Line station, with platforms located farside on 7th Street (southbound) and Olson Memorial Highway (northbound), opened late 2016 as part of the 7th Street Pilot Station Project. The shelters use the unified "kit-of-parts" design found across the A Line, also opened that same year, unlike the unique BRT shelters further south on 7th Street at Hennepin and Nicollet completed a year prior. The only modification needed before the launch of C Line service was the installation of ticket vending machines and Go-To card validators.

The placement of the northbound C Line platform at the existing stop was to accommodate buses turning left from 7th Street onto Olson Highway, as a platform sited on 7th Street could not facilitate safe bus movements through the intersection. An alignment of the D Line that used this northbound platform was studied, but ultimately not pursued after field tests. In testing, additional movements resulted in delays averaging two minutes with a high variability, and could exceed four minutes. Instead, a platform farside of 5th Avenue was chosen. Design and construction of the 5th Avenue platform was coordinated and funded as part of the Metro Green Line Extension project rather than the D Line project. Work began on the 5th Avenue platform the week of July 18, 2022. Southbound the D Line shares the existing C Line platform.

The station opened as Olson & 7th Street and was renamed when the additional platform was complete, swapping positions of the street names. Platform signage and timetables are more granular based on the service and direction.

=== Green Line Extension station ===
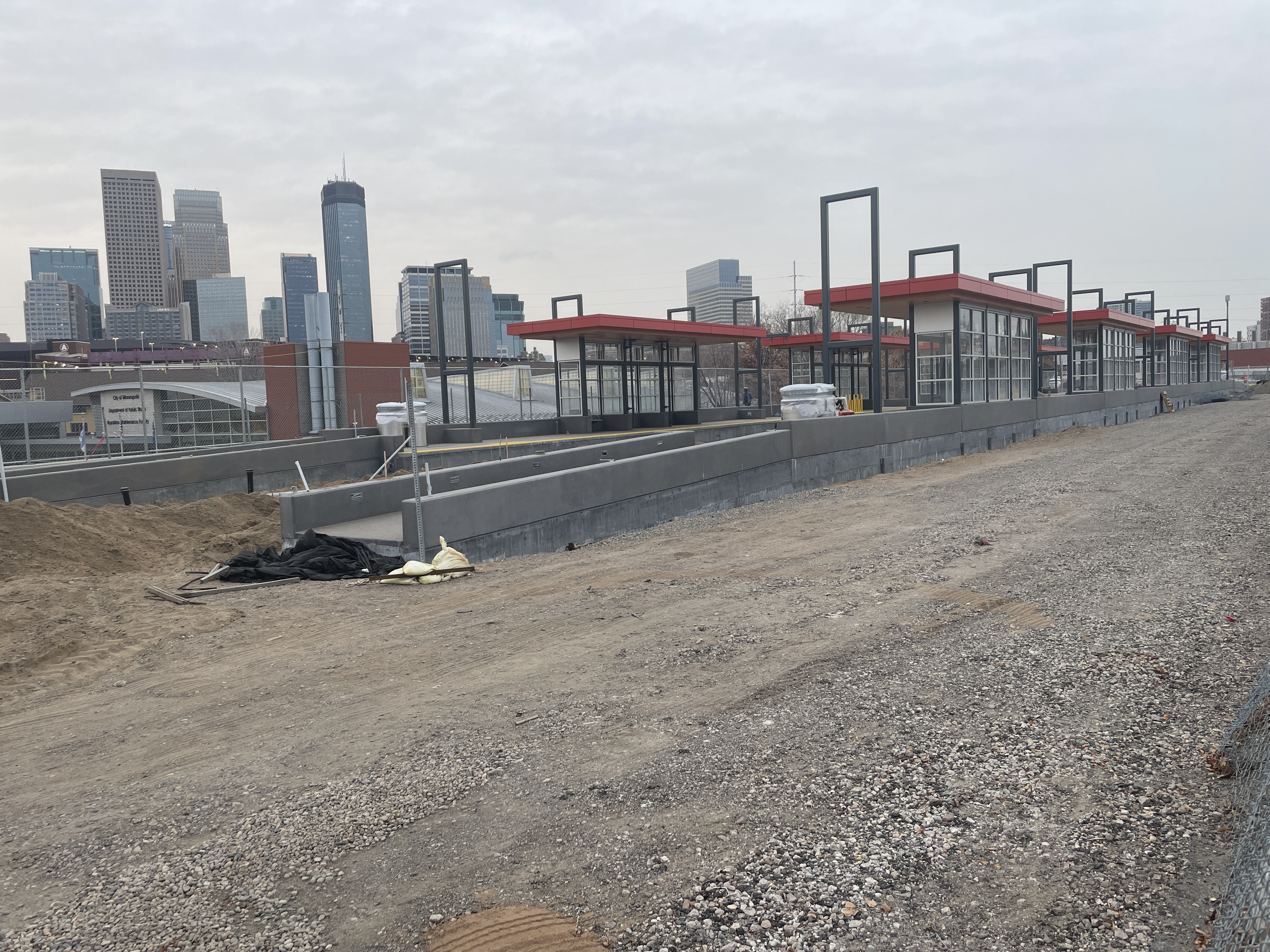
The future Green Line Extension Royalston Ave/Farmers Market Station under construction in November 2023

The station had the lowest predicted 2030 ridership from projections in 2014. Cutting the station was considered to save costs in 2015. The area was considered for a new Minnesota United FC stadium but Allianz Field was ultimately built in the Midway neighborhood of Saint Paul. The Metropolitan Council sought archaeological services for sites nearby the station in 2017. In an effort to reflect their locations a handful of Minneapolis stations were renamed, and Royalston Avenue became "Royalston Avenue/Farmers Market" in 2016 to reference the Minneapolis Farmers Market accessible from the station.

=== Gold Line Extension ===
In October 2024 it was announced that the under construction Gold Line would be extended in 2027 from downtown St. Paul and terminate at Olson & 7th Street. The investment would replace the existing Route 94, an express bus between the two downtowns via I-94, with BRT enhancements and a one-seat ride to East Metro communities. The Gold Line will also share C and D Line infrastructure in downtown Minneapolis and provide an alternative to the Green Line.
