= Hawthorne Transportation Center =

Intercity bus station in Minneapolis, Minnesota

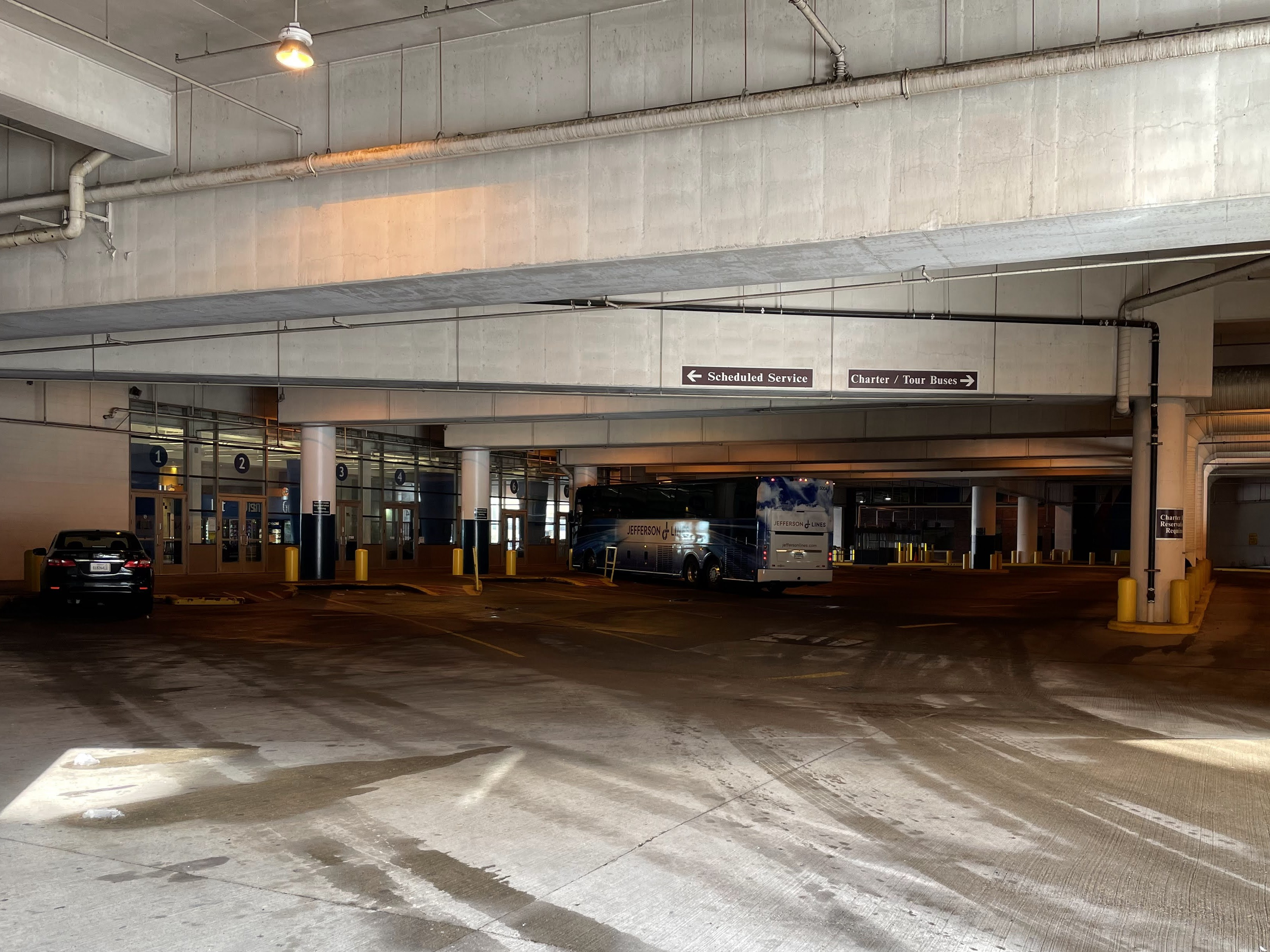
- The bus loading area in March 2023

General information
- Location: 950 Hawthorne Avenue, Minneapolis, Minnesota
- Coordinates: 44.977149°N 93.278481°W
- Owner: City of Minneapolis
- Operator: Greyhound Lines
- Bus stands: 8
- Bus operators: Flixbus; Greyhound Lines; Jefferson Lines; Land to Air Express
- Connections: Metro Transit 4, 5, 6, 9, 22, 61, C, D

Construction
- Parking: 975 spaces

Other information
- Website: Official website

History
- Opened: November 16, 2000
- Closed: September 14, 2023
Location

The Hawthorne Transportation Center was an intercity bus station in downtown Minneapolis, Minnesota. Bus service moved from Hawthorne to Ramp B at 516 2nd Avenue North in September 2023.

Minneapolis has seen intercity bus transit since at least 1919, when the Jefferson Transportation Company begin service between Minneapolis and Osseo. By 1921 there was a union bus depot operating on 7th Street. Two further bus stations would be built by Greyhound, in 1937 and 1968. The terminal on Hawthorne Avenue opened on November 16, 2000.

== Attributes ==
The old bus station building sits in the Downtown West neighborhood, at the northern corner of Hawthorne Avenue and North 10th Street. The station is owned by the City of Minneapolis.

== History ==
The first intercity bus station in Minneapolis was the Union Bus Depot, which opened by 1921 at 29 North 7th Street. In 1922, this station served the following eight bus operators: Buffalo-Minneapolis Bus Line, New Era Transportation Co., Minnesota Transportation Co., Inter-State Transportation Co., Jefferson Highway Transportation Co., Rochester Bus Line, Twin City Motor Bus Co., and Boulevard Transportation Co.

On February 26, 1937, a new bus station opened at 1st Avenue North and 7th Street, built by Northland Greyhound. The $500,000 terminal was designed by Lang & Raughland and was regarded as the most modernistic in the nation. The blue-glazed brick and white trimmed building could accommodate up to 25 buses at a time. The station at First Avenue would remain the primary point of departure until 1968, by which time the shine had worn off. On September 21, Central Greyhound opened a new station at 9th Street and Hawthorne Avenue. The new facility was considered bright and airy compared to its predecessor, with space for 14 buses, a restaurant, newsstand and giftcourt. The $2 million station served Greyhound, Jefferson Transportation Co., Thoreson Bus Line, Twin City Rapid Transit Company, and Zephyr Lines, Inc.

In the late 1990s, planning began on a replacement station to occupy the same site, at 950 Hawthorne Avenue. To accomplish this, a temporary station was opened in August 1998 at 11th and Hawthorne while construction took place on the new station. Other locations, such as in the Midway area were studied, however the location in downtown Minneapolis was considered ideal. The city of Minneapolis bought the property in order to build the terminal and a 975 space parking garage. The facility would pay for itself through the leases with intercity bus companies and the parking garage.

The 17,500 square foot station was designed by Symmes, Maini & McKee Associates to hold 8 buses, a 102-seat waiting area and a family center with play equipment. The bus facility cost $2 million, while the associated 975 space parking structure cost $31 million. Skyways across Hawthorne Avenue connect the facility to the Minneapolis Skyway System. A Greyhound sign salvaged from the 1937 station was put up at the new terminal to welcome the 34 daily buses the station saw upon opening. The station began welcoming passengers on November 16, 2000.

Service moved in September 2023 to the lower level of the Ramp B parking garage at 516 2nd Avenue North near Target Field. Service is managed by Greyhound Lines; while also serving Flixbus; Jefferson Lines; and Land to Air Express, a shuttle to and from Mankato, Minnesota. Together as of 2023, these companies provide 44 buses in and out of Minneapolis per day.

== See also ==
- Metro Transit
- Saint Paul Union Depot
