= Ramp A/7th Street Transit Center =

Rapid transit station in Minnesota, USA

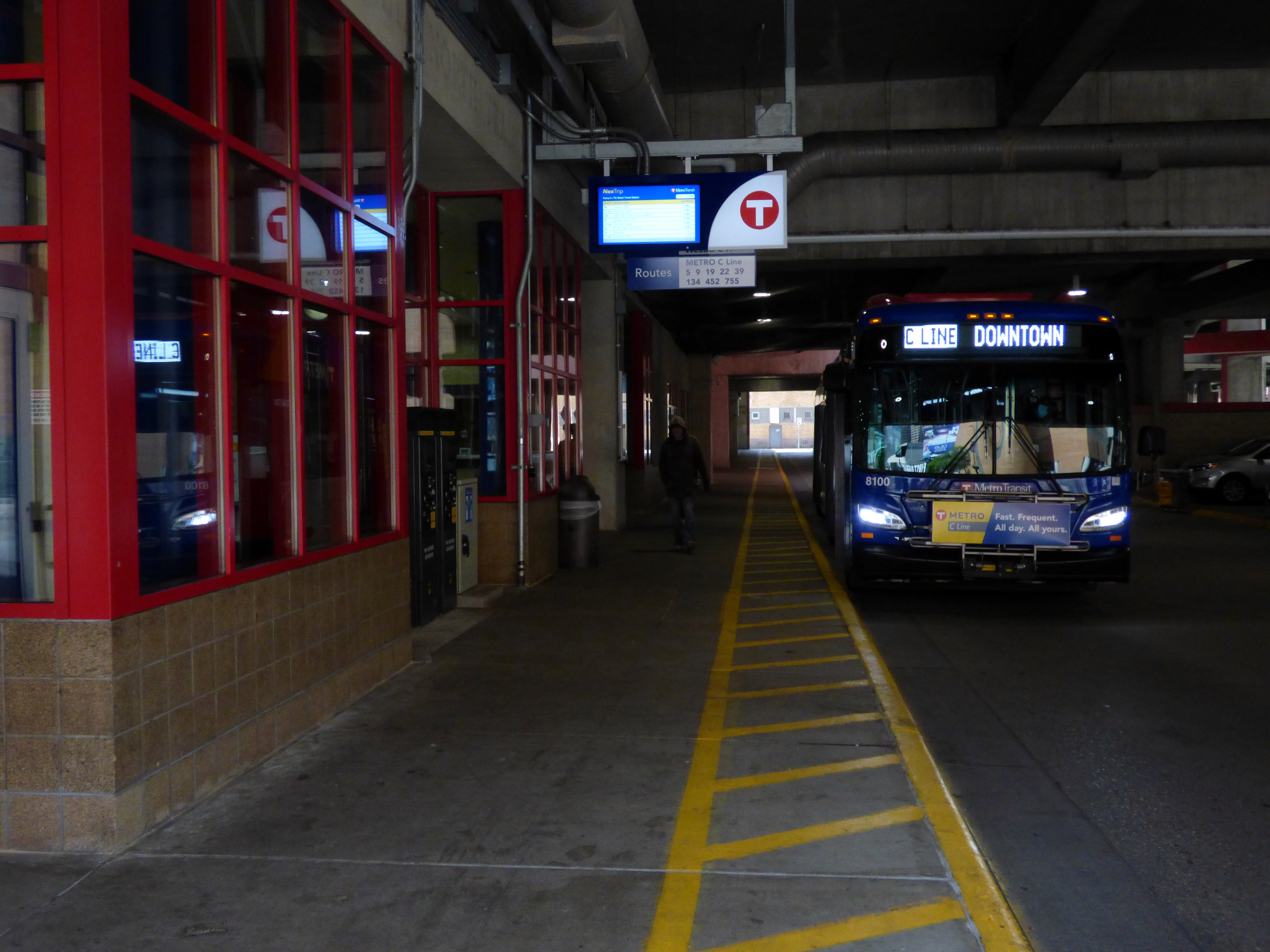
- The C Line departs Ramp A/7th Street Transit Center in 2020

General information
- Other names: Ramp A/7th Street Station; 7th Street Transit Center; 7th Street North Transit Station
- Location: 101 North Ninth Street; Minneapolis, Minnesota
- Coordinates: 44°58′41.56″N 93°16′39.97″W
- Owner: Minnesota Department of Transportation (structure)
- Operator: Metro Transit (transit facilities); City of Minneapolis (structure and parking facilities)
- Lines: C Line; D Line; 5, 9, 22, 61, 755
- Platforms: Side platform

Construction
- Structure type: Multi-story parking ramp
- Platform levels: 2
- Accessible: Yes: elevators, level boarding, information annunciators

Other information
- Station code: 17905 (1st Avenue Lobby)
- Fare zone: Downtown Minneapolis Fare Zone

History
- Opened: 1992 (transit center); December 7, 2019 (BRT service)
- Former names: 7th Street Garage Transit Center

Passengers
- 2018: 2,430 (average weekday) ▲101%

Services
| Preceding station | Metro | Following station |
|---|---|---|
| 7th Street & Olson/5th Avenue One-way operation | C Line | 8th Street & Hennepin Avenue toward 7th-8th Street & Park |
| 7th Street & Olson/5th Avenue One-way operation | D Line | 8th Street & Hennepin Avenue toward Mall of America |
Location

Ramp A/7th Street Transit Center is a bus rapid transit station in downtown Minneapolis, Minnesota. The transit center is a southbound station on the Metro C Line and D Line, as well as several local routes. The transit center is located inside of Ramp A, a 3,637 stall parking ramp built over sunken Interstate 394.

== Construction and design ==
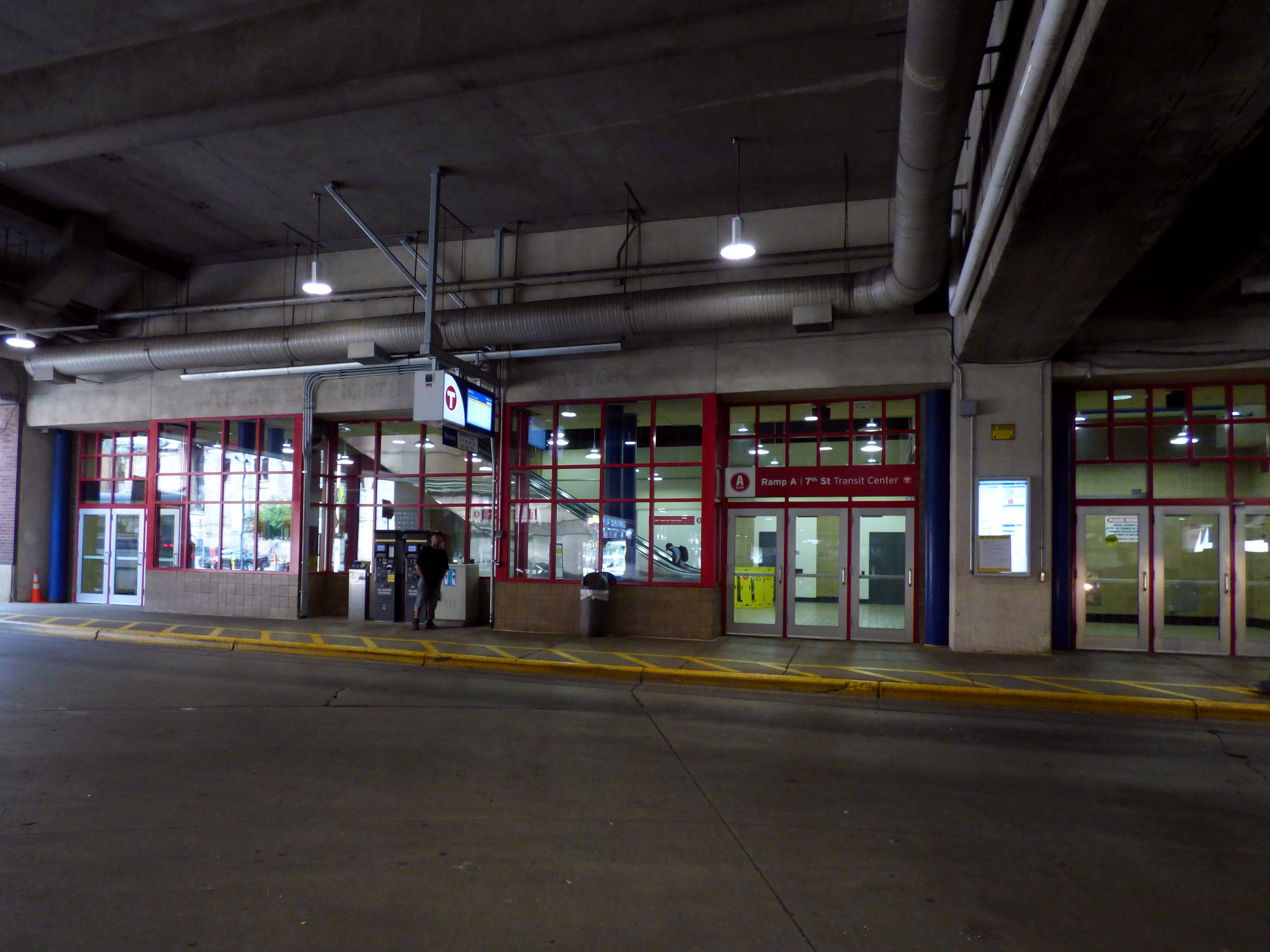
Bus rapid transit platform and lobby entrance

Construction of Interstate 394 through downtown Minneapolis began in 1989. Included as part of the project were three new parking ramps built over the new freeway known as the ABC Ramps. From west to east, the ramps are lettered A, B, and C. The total cost of the ramps were $111 million, with the Federal Highway Administration funding 90 percent of the cost, while the Minnesota Department of Transportation and the City of Minneapolis split the remaining. As part of the design, each ramp was built with three lobbies and platforms, one at street level and two at freeway level in each direction. The ABC Ramps and transit centers were completed in 1992 and are linked together by the Minneapolis Skyway.

Underneath the south side of the ramp at street level is the 1st Avenue Lobby, located between 10th Street and 8th Street. The 1st Avenue Lobby is the main bus station, serviced by routes from the west and northwest. The Metro C Line and Metro D Line make a southbound stop at the station. When the C Line opened June 8, 2019, 8th Street was under reconstruction, making it necessary to reroute buses from the transit center to Glenwood Avenue and a temporary station, Glenwood & 7th Street, was created. The facility was retrofitted in 2018 with real-time information and ticket machines at the 1st Avenue Lobby for bus rapid transit operations.

Underneath the ramp at freeway level are two lightly-used bus stations, one on each side of the freeway. Using bus-only lanes on either side of the freeway, buses are able to access stops beneath each ABC Ramp. The 2nd Avenue Lobby, in the middle of the ramp, is for eastbound buses to stop. The Twins Way (formerly 3rd Avenue) Lobby is located at the north of the ramp, where westbound buses leaving Minneapolis along Interstate 394 stop. In recent years, no regular routes have stopped at the freeway lobbies, however, Southwest Transit uses the space for layovers and the stops are sometimes utilized for express buses to and from Minnesota Twins games.

== Connections ==
In 2000, the Hawthorne Transportation Center was constructed on the parcel south of the parking ramp, Minneapolis's main intercity bus station for Greyhound, Jefferson Lines, and Land to Air Express. Each lobby is directly connected to the Minneapolis Skyway, and through that a short walk to Ramp B/5th Street Transit Center (serving Metro), Target Field station, and Ramp C/4th Street North Transit Station (serving Megabus and Flixbus).

== Incidents ==
On the evening of February 6, 2020, a fatal shooting occurred on a C Line bus stopped at the Ramp A/7th Street Transit Center. A gunman, Malcolm Lessley, boarded the bus earlier in the evening. Before the incident, Lessley briefly conversed with one of the victims and taking out a handgun and shooting the victim in the face at 9:28 pm. While leaving the bus, the gunman fatally shot a second victim, Tommie McCoy, in the side of the head. The first victim was taken to Hennepin County Medical Center in critical condition. Lessley fled the scene and was arrested by police minutes later. After the shooting, the Metropolitan Council announced it would increase safety on transit by having Metro Transit Police work more overtime and having plainclothes officers ride transit. Lessley, charged with second degree murder and attempted murder, was found incompetent to stand trial.

One week later, family and friends of Tommie McCoy held a vigil for him at the transit center.

The bus involved, Metro Transit 8103, a bus rapid transit New Flyer XD60, was temporarily removed from service after the incident. It was the first shooting aboard a Metro Transit bus in at least a decade.

== Notable places nearby ==
The transit center is connected by skyway to Target Field, Target Center, and Orpheum Theatre. World-famous First Avenue is one block away.

== See also ==
- Ramp B/5th Street Transit Center
- Ramp C/4th Street North Transit Station
