= 7th-8th Street & Nicollet station =

Bus stop in Minneapolis, Minnesota, United States

Coordinates: 44.97684°N 93.27346°W

7th-8th Street & Nicollet
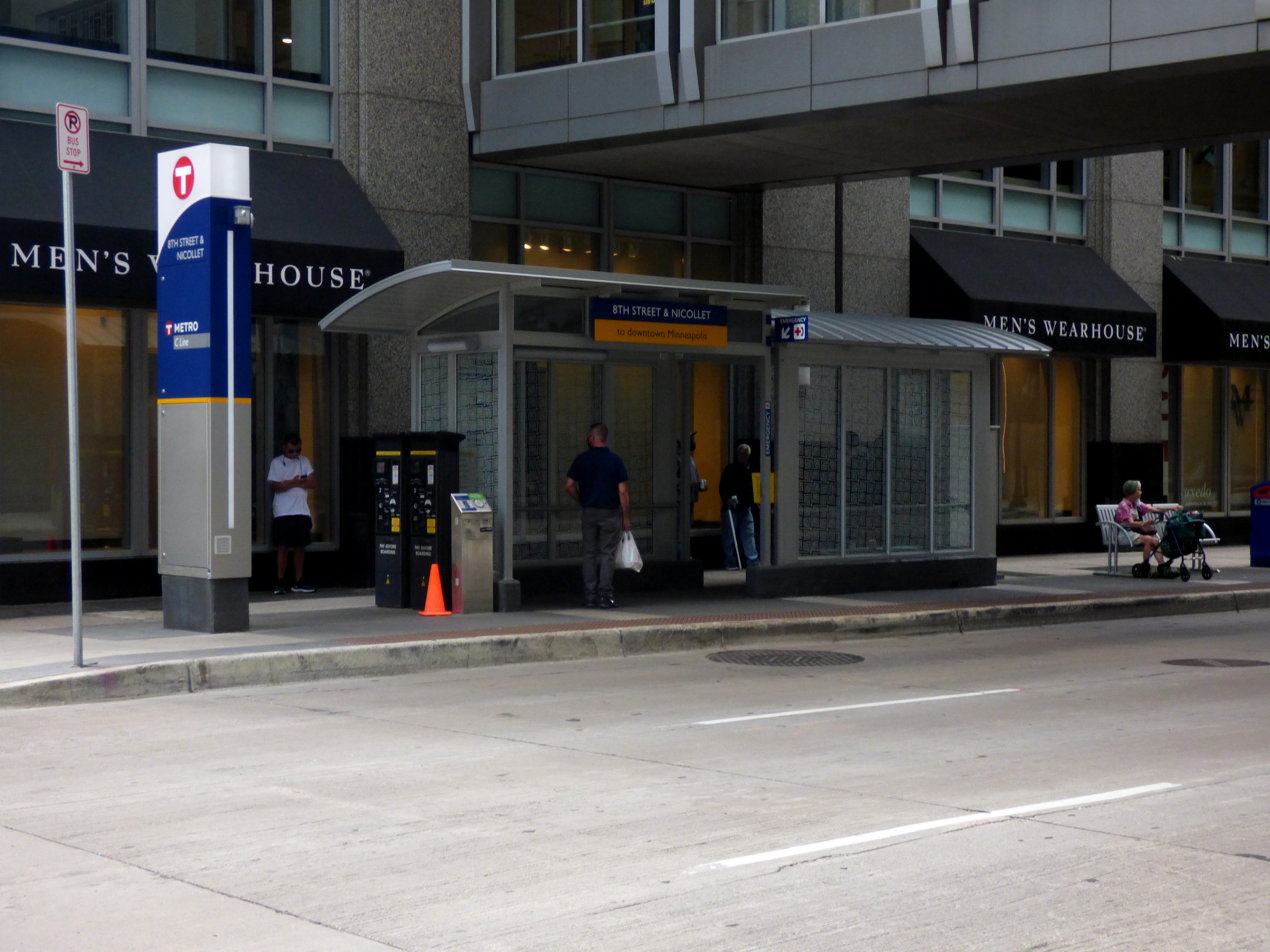
- 8th Street & Nicollet platform in 2020

General information
- Owner: Metro Transit
- Lines: C Line; Green Line Night Bus; 3, 5, 19, 721, 724, 991, 992
- Platforms: Split side platform
- Connections: 7, 11, 12, 14, 17, 18, 22, 25, 59, 61, 94, 141, 353, 355, 365, 542, 755, 758, 764

Construction
- Structure type: Custom shelter (northbound); Medium shelter (southbound)
- Parking: No
- Cycle facilities: Yes
- Accessible: Yes

Other information
- Station code: 17902 (northbound); 17907 (southbound)

History
- Opened: June 8, 2019 (northbound BRT service); December 7, 2019 (southbound BRT service)

Passengers
- 2018: 1743 (Avg. weekday boardings)

Services
Preceding station	Metro	Following station
7th Street & Nicollet
7th Street & Hennepin toward Brooklyn Center	C Line	7th Street & 3rd/4th Avenue One-way operation
7th Street & Hennepin toward Brooklyn Center	D Line	7th Street & 3rd/4th Avenue One-way operation
7th Street & Hennepin toward Target Field	Green Line Night Bus (suspended)	Government Plaza One-way operation
8th Street & Nicollet
8th Street & Hennepin One-way operation	C Line	8th Street & 3rd/4th Avenue toward 7th-8th Street & Park
8th Street & Hennepin One-way operation	D Line	8th Street & 3rd/4th Avenue toward Mall of America
Location

7th-8th Street & Nicollet is a bus rapid transit station on the Metro C Line and D Line in downtown Minneapolis, Minnesota. The station is located at the intersection of Nicollet Mall, with the northbound platform located on 7th Street and the southbound platform on 8th Street. The platforms are referred to as 7th Street & Nicollet and 8th Street & Nicollet, respectively. The station is located within the Downtown Minneapolis Fare Zone, where riders can travel in the zone for 50¢ with no transfers.

7th Street & Nicollet is also the westbound/northbound rail replacement bus stop for Nicollet Mall station. Prior to its suspension on March 25, 2020, the station saw regular owl service from the Green Line Night Bus. Eastbound/southbound replacement buses use 6th Street rather than 8th Street. As with every Metro station, both platforms are fully accessible, and feature real-time information, shelters, and heating.

== History ==
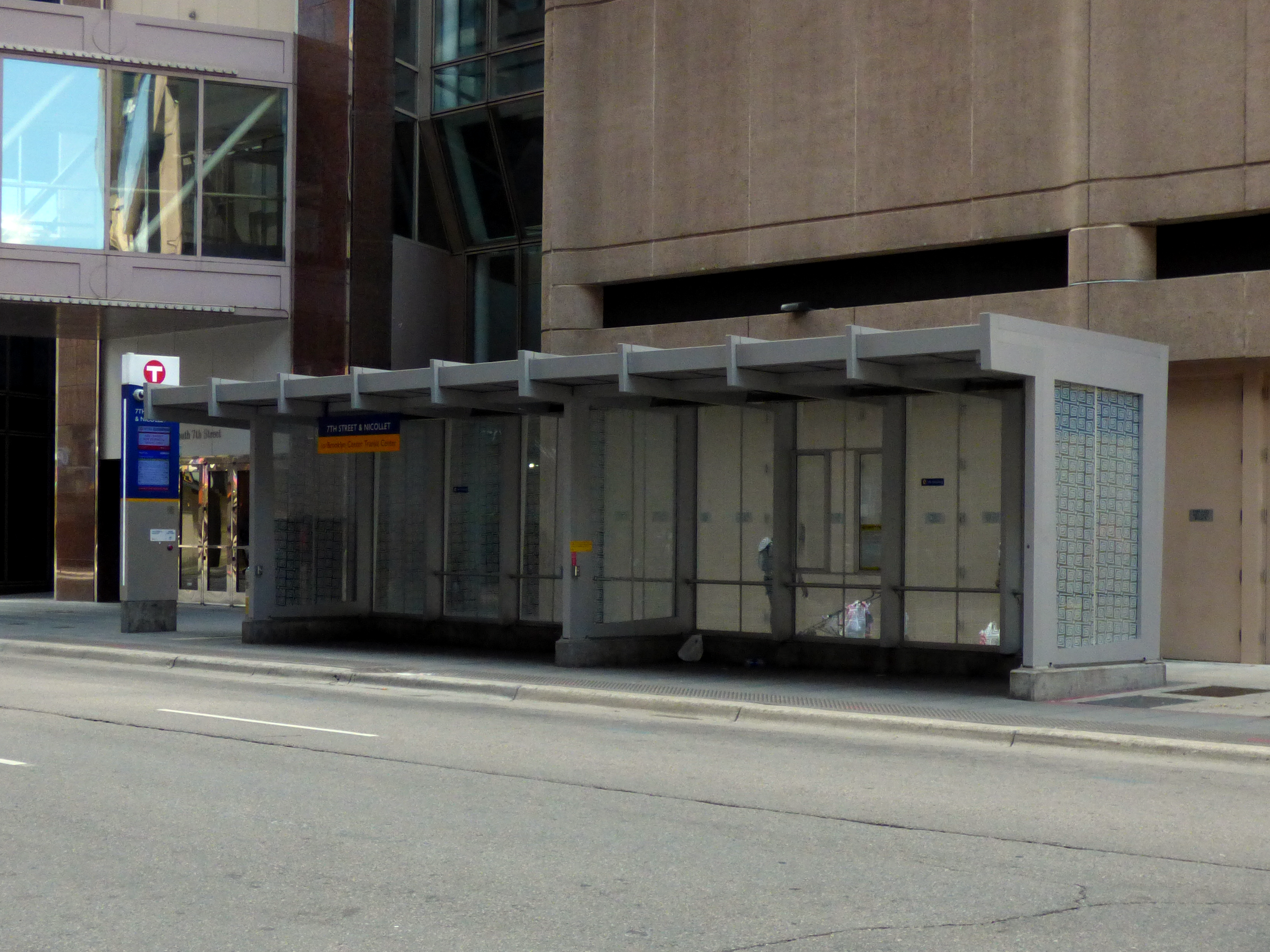
7th Street & Nicollet platform

The current 7th Street & Nicollet platform opened August 2015 aiming to increase capacity and implement bus rapid transit features at the existing stop. In 2012, it was the single busiest bus stop in Minnesota, seeing 4,300 average weekday boardings. On February 3, 2014, Metro Transit split some routes' stopping locations to a new stop south of Nicollet Mall to increase capacity. Routes 134, 144, 353, 355, 365, 375, 452, 755, 758, and 764 were moved there, with Routes 7, 14, and 19 (predecessor to the C Line) having moved there a year before. The station was constructed as part of the 7th Street Transit Advantage project at a cost of $330,000 and was paid for by the City of Minneapolis.

8th Street & Nicollet platform was constructed in 2019 as part of the 8th Street Reconstruction Project. The station opened to all bus routes December 7, 2019 after roadway reconstruction was completed.

=== 6th Street & Nicollet station platform ===
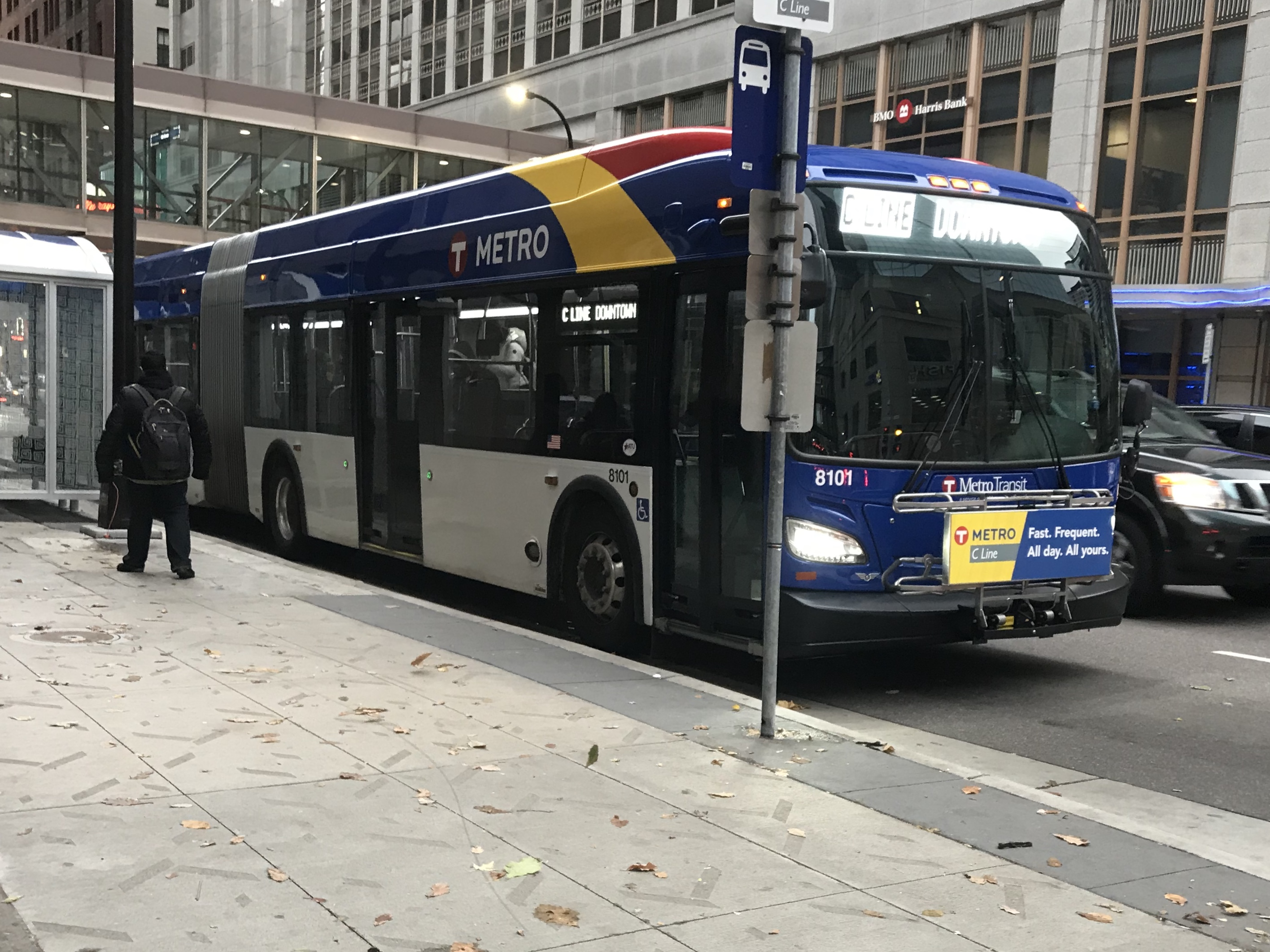
A C Line bus dropping off passengers at the temporary 6th Street & Nicollet station in 2019

From opening day on June 8 until December 6, 2019, southbound C Line buses stopped at a temporary platform on 6th Street nearside Nicollet Mall. At the time of opening, 8th Street was under construction between Hennepin Avenue and Chicago Avenue. The temporary stop lacked standard bus rapid transit elements such as real-time signage and off-board fare collection. On December 7, 2019, C Line buses were routed onto 8th Street and began serving the new station platform at Nicollet Mall. Rail replacement buses still continue to use this stop during light rail closures.

== Notable places nearby ==
The station is located at the intersection of Nicollet Mall, providing access to local bus connections, as well as several shops and dining. Kitty-corner to each platform is the IDS Center, the tallest building in Minnesota. Between both platforms is the former flagship Dayton's department store.

The station is a short walk from Nicollet Mall station at 5th Street for connections with METRO light rail trains.
