= Metro C Line (Minnesota) =

Bus rapid transit line

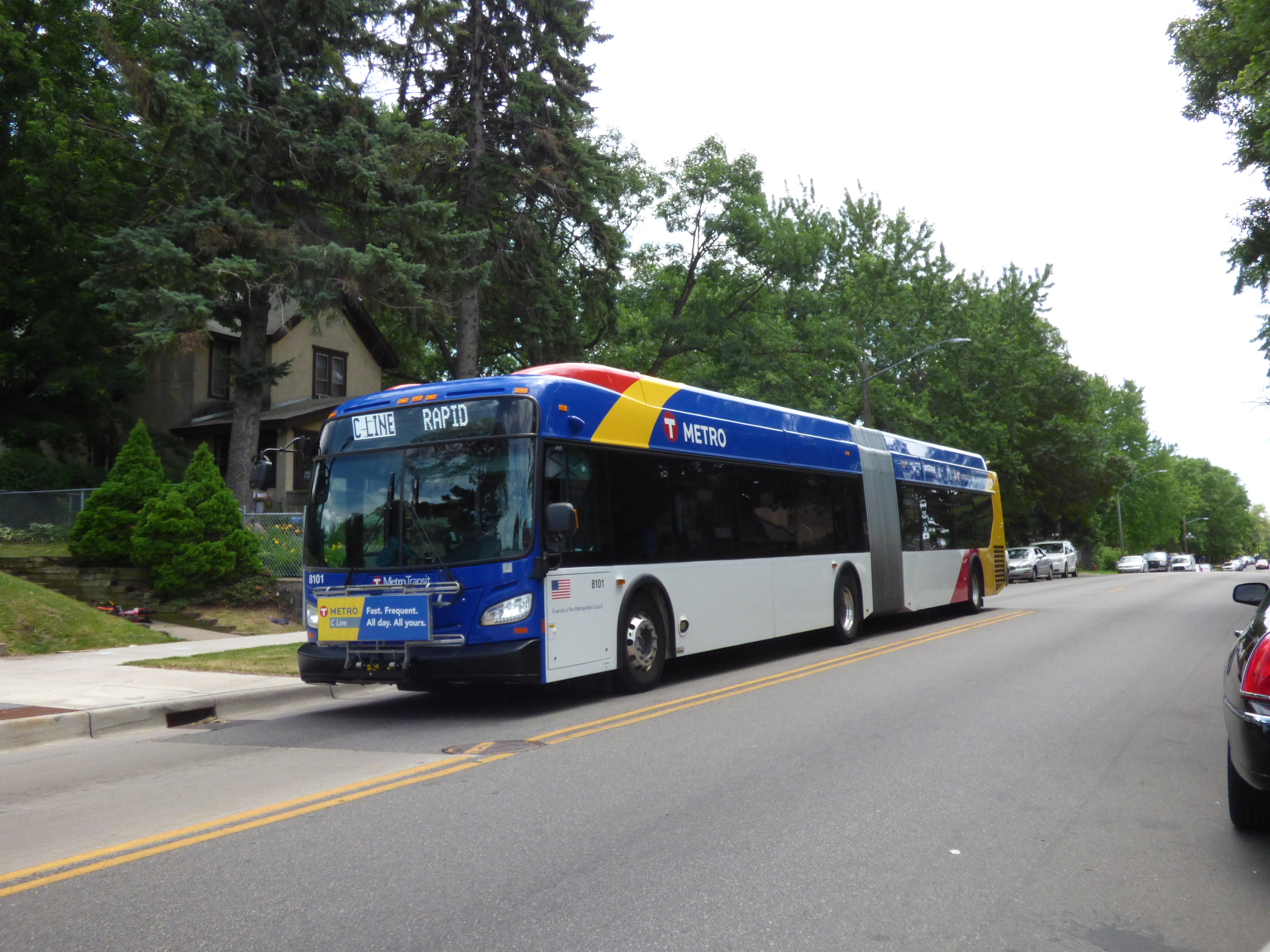
- A northbound bus on Penn Avenue in North Minneapolis.

Overview
- System: Metro
- Operator: Metro Transit
- Garage: Fred T. Heywood
- Vehicle: New Flyer XD60, New Flyer XE60
- Status: Operational
- Began service: June 8, 2019
- Predecessors: Route 19; Parts of 6th Ave N, Glenwood, and Penn Streetcars

Route
- Route type: Bus rapid transit
- Locale: Minneapolis–St. Paul, Minnesota
- Start: Brooklyn Center Transit Center
- Via: Olson Memorial Highway, Penn Avenue
- End: Downtown Minneapolis
- Length: 8.4 mi (13.5 km)
- Stations: 20 (4 station pairs downtown)

Service
- Level: Daily
- Frequency: Every 10 minutes
- Journey time: 31 minutes
- Operates: 6:00am – 1:00am
- Ridership: 5,742 (2025 avg. weekday)

The Metro C Line is a bus rapid transit line in Brooklyn Center and Minneapolis, Minnesota operated by Metro Transit. The line is part of Metro Transit's Metro network of light rail and bus rapid transit lines. The route operates from the Brooklyn Center Transit Center along Penn Avenue and Olson Memorial Highway, terminating in downtown Minneapolis. The route is analogous to the existing Route 19 and is projected to increase ridership on this corridor from 7,000 to 9,000 by 2030. Eventually, part of its route will shift south to Glenwood Avenue from Olson Memorial Highway.

The C Line, along with the similarly built A Line, features fewer stops and modern bus stops with "train-like" amenities, including distinct stations and off-board fare payment. Additionally, the C Line features the Twin Cities' first battery electric buses, built by New Flyer. Construction on the C Line began in March 2018 and began revenue service on June 8, 2019. The week of November 25, 2019, the C Line surpassed one-million rides after only five months of operation. Average weekday ridership was 30% higher than Route 19 ridership before C Line construction. Average Saturday and Sunday ridership has increased 25% and 40%, respectively.

== Route ==
The northern terminus of the C Line is at Brooklyn Center Transit Center in Minneapolis suburb of Brooklyn Center. Station facilities include an indoor waiting area, restrooms, bike racks, and ticket vending machines and Go-To card readers for off-board fare collection. Brooklyn Center Transit Center also has rapid chargers for battery electric New Flyer buses, but as of October 15, 2019, electric buses have been pulled from service due to charging problems at their garage. From there, the C Line begins traveling southbound along Xerxes with one stop at 56th Avenue, adjacent to the former site of Brookdale Mall. The line then continues south on Brooklyn Boulevard with a station at 51st Avenue before entering the City of Minneapolis, where Brooklyn Boulevard changes to Osseo Road. An infill station at 47th Avenue will be constructed between 2023 and 2025. The C Line turns south onto Penn Avenue, splitting from the under construction Metro D Line, stopping the next block at 43rd Avenue. From there, the line stops every .25 miles (0.40 km) to .5 miles (0.80 km) serving North Minneapolis along Penn Avenue. At Olson Memorial Highway, the C Line turns east to head towards downtown Minneapolis with four station stops along the highway.

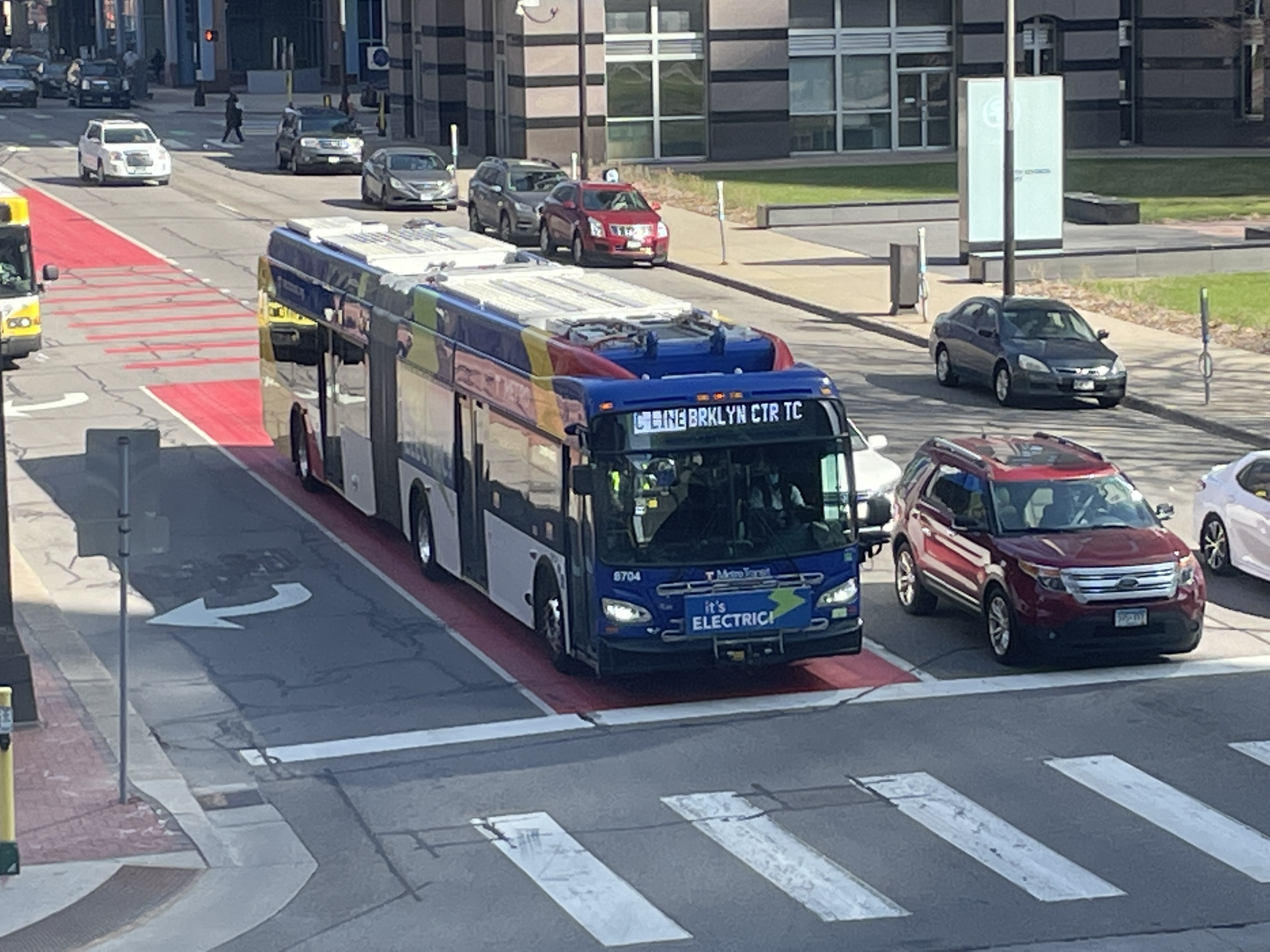
A Metro C Line bus heading northbound in the 7th Street bus lane installed in 2021.

The route enters downtown along 7th Street, which splits into one-way pairs; 8th Street southbound and 7th Street northbound. Southbound, three BRT stations are currently open, at Ramp A/7th Street Transit Center and 8th Street at Nicollet Mall and at 3rd/4th Avenues. Stations on 8th Street at Hennepin and Park Avenues will fully open at a later date, with buses still stopping there on request. After the final stop at Park Avenue, buses continue to 11th Avenue where they layover and await the return trip northbound.

Heading northbound from downtown, the C Line begins its route at Park Avenue Station located under Hennepin County Medical Center and continues north on 7th Street. Stations are at 3rd/4th Avenues, Nicollet Mall, and Hennepin Avenue. These stations are Metro Transit's standard bus rapid transit stations with off-board fare collection, real-time information, and near-level boarding. After exiting downtown, the C Line follows the same route north to Brooklyn Center Transit Center.

=== 6th Street operations ===
Upon opening day, 8th Street in downtown Minneapolis was being reconstructed. As a result, southbound buses were detoured onto Glenwood Avenue until 6th Street where they turned right and continued with temporary stops at Hennepin Avenue, Nicollet Mall, 3rd Avenue, and Park Avenue. These temporary stops do not include real time information or fare-collection systems, and riders could not board C Line buses at these stops without a valid transfer. In July 2019, another temporary stop southbound was added in downtown Minneapolis at 7th Street on Glenwood Avenue, analogous and a short distance to the Ramp A/7th Street Transit Center.

Buses were permanently routed to 8th Street December 7, 2019.

=== Phase II Glenwood Avenue alignment ===
The Metro Blue Line Extension of the METRO Blue Line was planned to run down Olson Memorial Highway between downtown Minneapolis and Penn Avenue. Under Phase II, at the start of light rail service the C Line would move from Olson Highway to Glenwood Avenue about a quarter mile south. The goal was to balance transit service across multiple corridors while retaining similar travel times. In 2016, it was identified that there would be four stations on Glenwood Avenue at Morgan, Lyndale, Royalston, and between Cedar Lake Road and Dupont Avenues. At Penn Avenue and Olson Highway, a new station would be constructed south of Olson on Penn, moving it from its temporary stop location on Olson.

As an interim service on Olson Memorial Highway, three stations (Penn, Humboldt, and Bryant) were not built as normal C Line stations. Shelters are standard Metro Transit shelters and there is no near-level boarding, however, concrete pads were constructed the entire length of a bus. Real time information is provided at these stations, but they lack the service's distinct pylon markers. These stations still have off-board fare collection vending machines and Go-To card readers.

Negotiations with BNSF prevented the planned alignment from proceeding and the future, including the alignment, of the Bottineau Blue Line Extension is unclear. In August 2020, the Metropolitan Council announced that the Bottineau Blue Line Extension would be looking for an alternative route to Brooklyn Park. Following the decision, Metro Transit is advancing planning for the Phase II alignment to be completed before the original 2024 opening of the light rail service. Stations at Penn, Lyndale, and Royalston have been coordinated with other public works projects.

Additionally, in 2021 the Minnesota Legislature passed a bill that included $250,000 to analyze transit improvements from Medina, Minnesota to downtown Minneapolis, requiring options for bus rapid transit service to be included. Initially studied in 2015, the line would follow the C Line's alignment on Olson Memorial Highway out of downtown Minneapolis, advancing the goal of balancing transit service across multiple corridors.

=== Potential extensions ===
Separately, in Spring 2025, seventeen corridors were selected to be the next potential BRT corridors.After West 7th Street was selected to be the J Line and Nicollet Avenue was selected to be the K Line (with the L Line to be selected at a later date after an additional study) , it was revealed that two corridors that did not pass (Zane/63rd and the southern half of Bloomington/Lyndale North) would be studied as possible north and south C Line extensions, respectively.

== Service ==
C Line frequency
Type	Span of service	Frequency
Early Weekdays	5:00 a.m. – 6:30 am	15–30 minutes
Weekdays	6:30 a.m. – 7:00 pm	10 minutes
Late Weekdays	7:00 p.m. – 1:00 am	15–30 minutes
Saturday	5:30 a.m. – 1:30 am	10–30 minutes
Sunday	5:30 a.m. – 1:30 am	10–30 minutes

The C Line runs every ten minutes during daytime service on weekdays and weekends, with reduced frequencies of up to thirty minutes in the early morning and late evening. Initially, route 19 was retained as thirty-minute underlying bus service along the line. Select rush hour Route 19 trips were rerouted along Thomas Ave to serve areas previously served by terminal branches of Route 19. In December 2021, route 19 was suspended due to a driver shortage and was officially discontinued in March 2025. Five months after opening the route in October 2019, combined ridership for Route 19 and the C Line was roughly 8,300 weekday rides. Previously the corridor served 7,000 weekday rides with just Route 19. Ridership increased on weekdays by 30%, Saturdays by 25%, and Sundays by 40%, five months after opening.

== Stations ==
=== Station characteristics ===
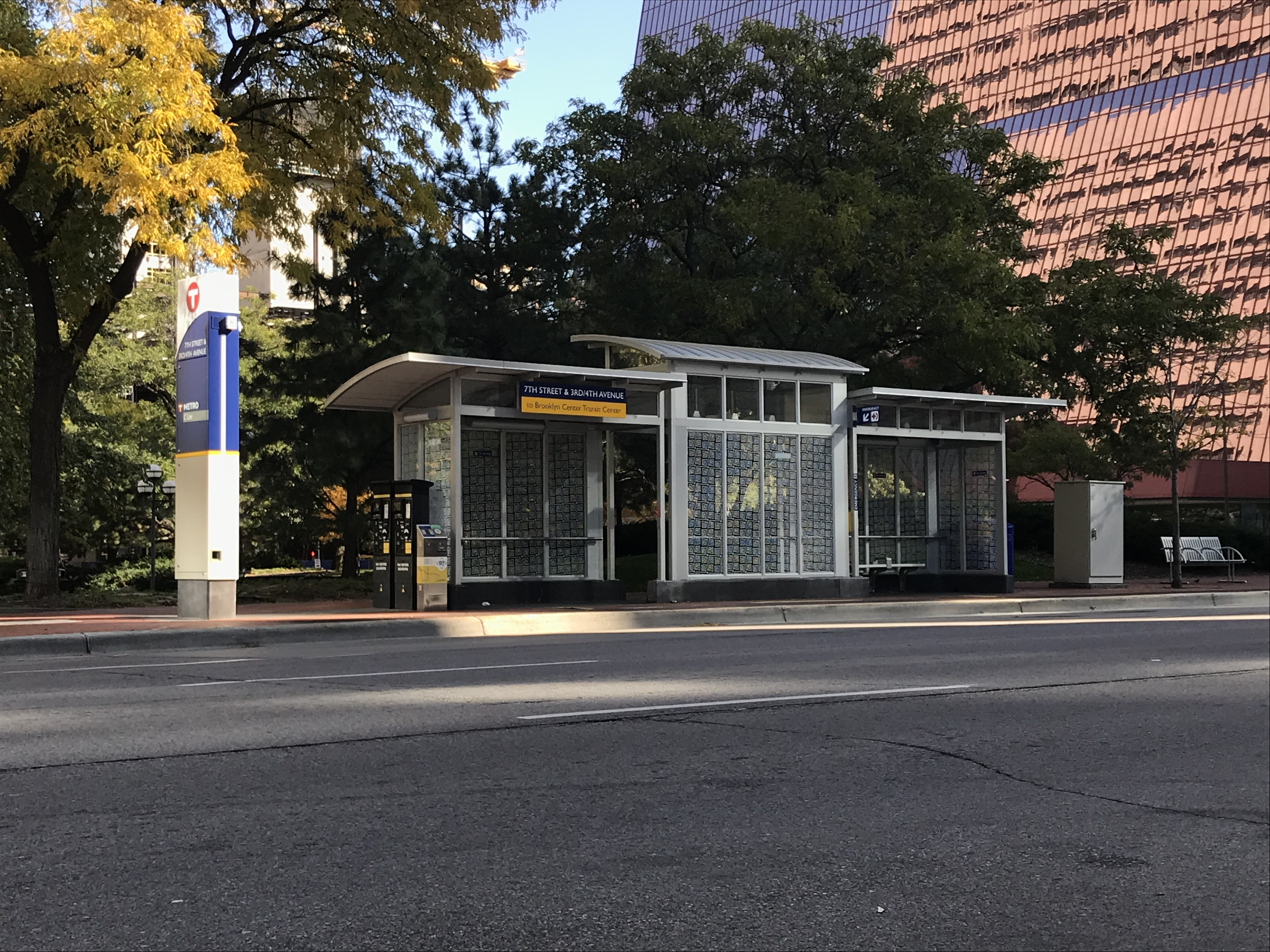
A typical C Line station at 7th St & 3rd Ave.

Stations on Metro Transit's bus rapid transit service are unique and have enhanced features to differentiate them from local bus stops. Station shelters follow a "kit-of-parts" design so they can be easily identified and used throughout the system. There are three different station sizes–small, medium, and large–and the size chosen depends on daily boardings and site context. Stations have lighted canopies, on-demand heating, security cameras and emergency telephones, benches, and bike parking. Pavement in boarding areas are treated with a darker shade of concrete to delineate them from the sidewalk. Ticket vending machines and Go-To card readers are located on platforms for off-board fare collection, speeding up the boarding process and reducing bus dwell time. Each station has a pylon marker that provides real-time bus arrival information and station identification. Illuminated signage at the top of the station blinks when a bus is one minute away. Curbs at stations have tactile warning strips and are raised 9 in (23 cm) from the road surface, facilitating near-level boarding to speed up and make boarding easier.

Penn, Humboldt, and Bryant stations on Olson Memorial Highway were designed to be temporary and use standard Metro Transit shelters, but still have real time information and off-board fare collection. It was planned to have the Metro Blue Line Extension operate on Olson Memorial Highway, and upon its opening would have shifted the C Line's route south to Glenwood Avenue, where permanent stations would be constructed. Upon opening, the five southbound stops on 6th Street in downtown Minneapolis were drop-off only until the route permanently moved to 8th Street when construction was complete. These stops had no features or amenities due to their temporary use.

=== List of stations ===
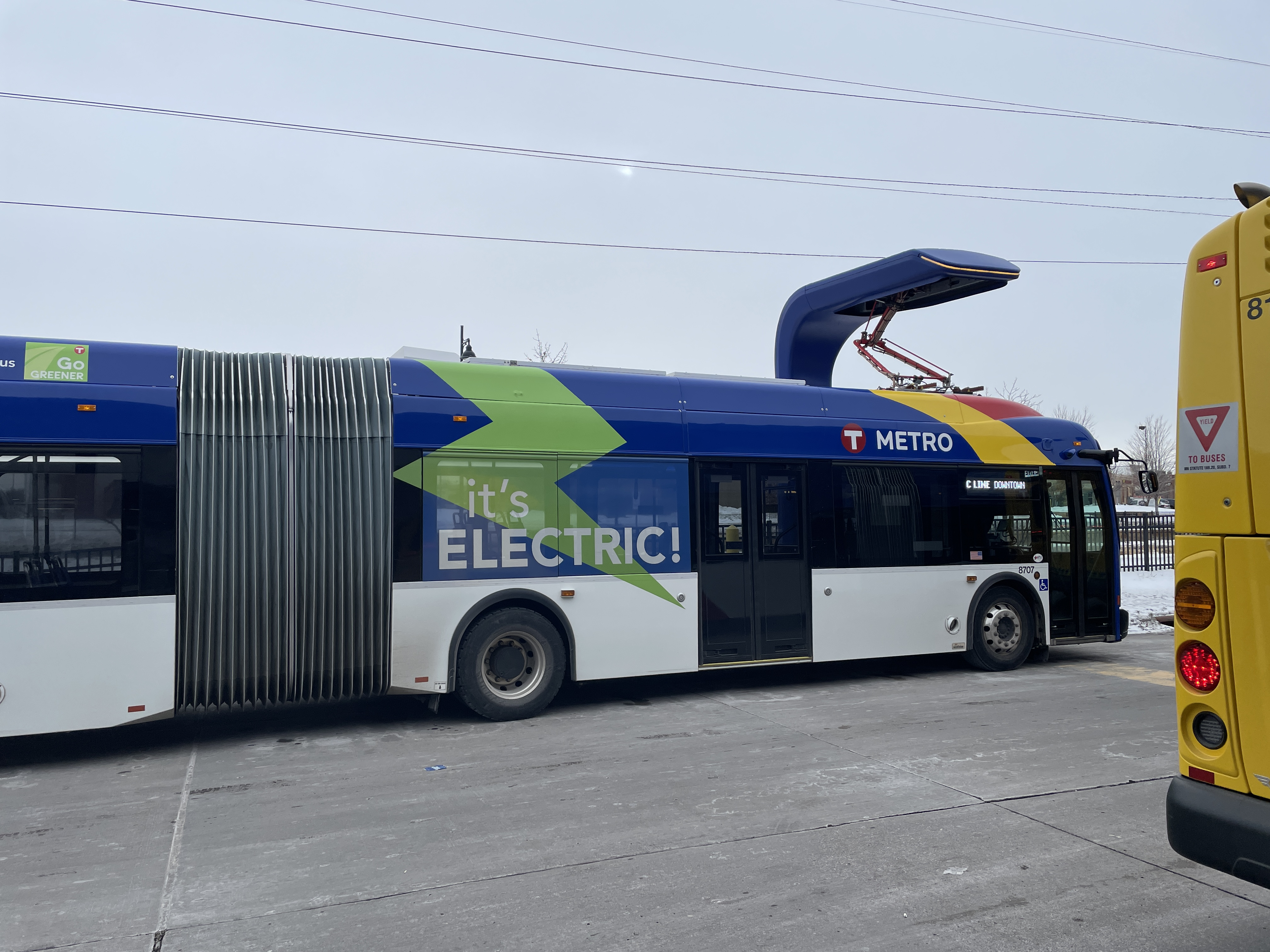
Metro C Line battery electric bus charging during layover at Brooklyn Center Transit Center.

Station		Neighborhood(s)	City	Opened		Connections	Fall 2019 weekday C Line boardings
Brooklyn Center Transit Center		Centennial	Brooklyn Center	June 8, 2019		Routes 5, 19, 22, 717, 721, 722, 723, 724, 761, 762, 801	334
Xerxes & 56th Avenue		Centennial	Brooklyn Center	June 8, 2019		Routes 5, 19, 22, 717, 721, 724, 761	256
Brooklyn & 51st Avenue		Happy Hollow	Brooklyn Center	June 8, 2019		Routes 5, 19, 22, 32, 721, 724, 761	76
Osseo & 47th Avenue		Victory	Minneapolis	December 7, 2024		Route 19	-
Penn & 43rd Avenue		Victory	Minneapolis	June 8, 2019		Route 19	221
Penn & Dowling		Cleveland, Folwell, Victory, Webber-Camden	Minneapolis	June 8, 2019		Route 19	179
Penn & 36th Avenue		Cleveland, Folwell	Minneapolis	June 8, 2019		Route 19	310
Penn & Lowry (Note: Hosted opening day celebrations, with two inaugural buses running to Brooklyn Center and to Downtown Minneapolis.)		Cleveland, Folwell, Jordan	Minneapolis	June 8, 2019		Routes 19, 32	549
Penn & 29th Avenue		Jordan	Minneapolis	June 8, 2019		Routes 19, 32	188
Penn & West Broadway		Jordan, Willard-Hay	Minneapolis	June 8, 2019		Routes 14, 19	402
Penn & Golden Valley		Willard-Hay	Minneapolis	June 8, 2019		Routes 14, 19, 30	408
Penn & Plymouth		Near-North, Willard-Hay	Minneapolis	June 8, 2019		Routes 7, 19, 32	376
Olson & Penn		Harrison, Near-North, Willard-Hay	Minneapolis	June 8, 2019		Routes 19, 755	279
Olson & Humboldt		Harrison, Near-North	Minneapolis	June 8, 2019		Route 19	197
Olson & Bryant		Sumner-Glenwood	Minneapolis	June 8, 2019		Route 19	209
7th Street & Olson/5th Avenue		North Loop	Minneapolis	June 8, 2019		Routes 5, 19, 22, 755	292
Ramp A/7th Street Transit Center (Note: Southbound service only)		Downtown West	Minneapolis	December 7, 2019		Many downtown routes	26
7th Street & Hennepin	8th Street & Hennepin	Downtown West	Minneapolis	June 8, 2019	Early 2021	Many downtown routes	546
7th Street & Nicollet	8th Street & Nicollet	Downtown West	Minneapolis	June 8, 2019	December 7, 2019	Many downtown routes, Nicollet Mall	1,127
7th Street & 3rd/4th Avenue	8th Street & 3rd/4th Avenue	Downtown West	Minneapolis	June 8, 2019	December 7, 2019	Many downtown routes	322
7th Street & Park	8th Street & Park	Elliot Park	Minneapolis	June 8, 2019	March 28, 2022	Many downtown routes	502

== Fleet ==
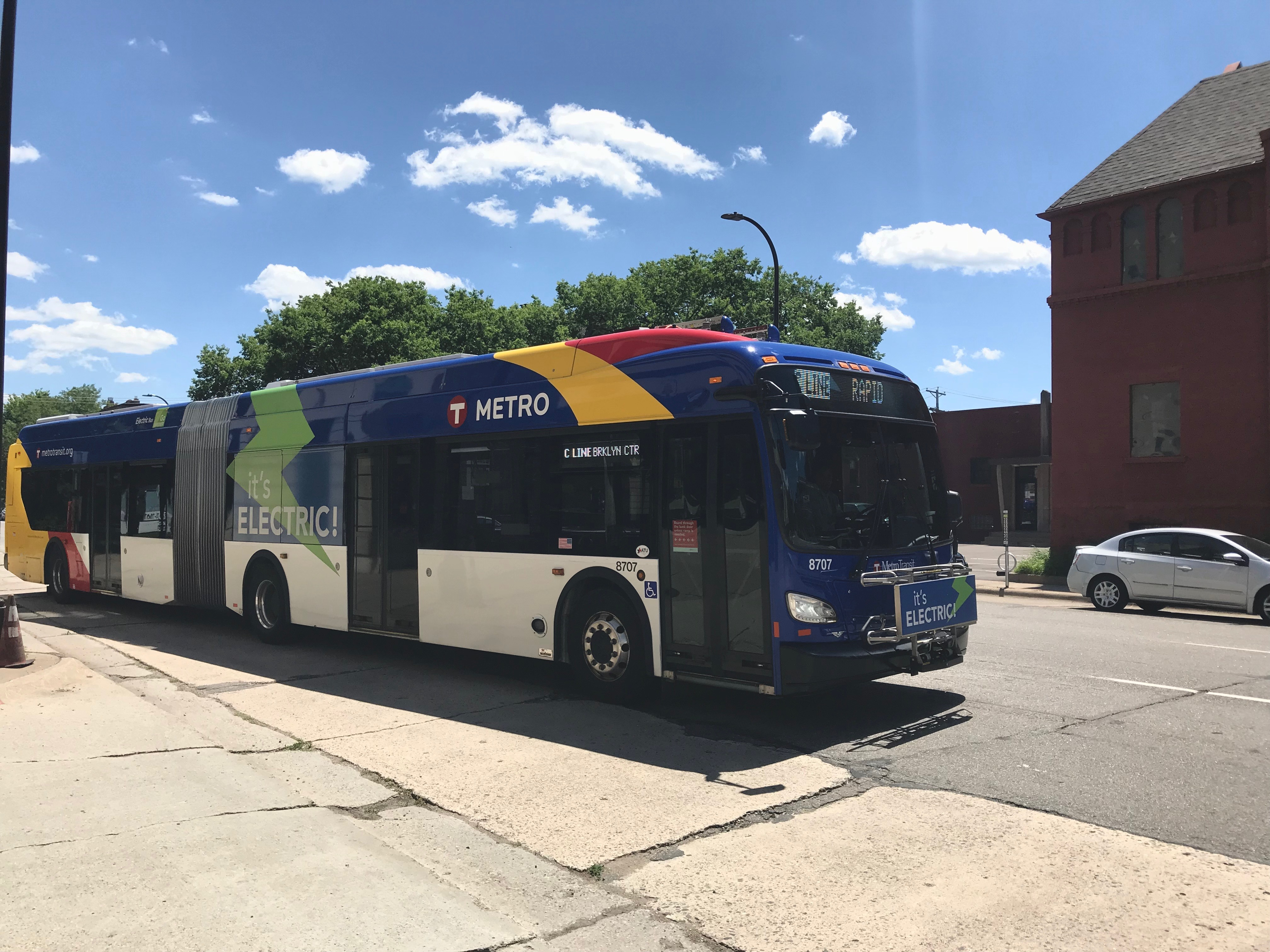
A C Line New Flyer XE60 battery electric articulated bus in service in June 2020.

The C Line has fourteen 60-foot articulated buses assigned to the route. Six buses are diesel XD60 models and eight are battery electric XE60 models, the first electric articulated buses in Minnesota. These buses were manufactured by New Flyer Industries in Saint Cloud, Minnesota and have three doors and wider aisles for faster boarding. The fleet is also equipped with transit signal priority, Quantum wheelchair securement, free WiFi, and USB chargers. Each bus was given a unique name by communities along the corridor. The electric buses had an effective range of 120-140 miles depending on the weather but lost 40% of their range in the winter due to the cold weather. Diesel heaters help heat electric buses during cold weather.

Electric buses on the route haven't always been available due to charging and mechanical issues. Over the first 631 service days from opening until February 2021, there were only 10 days with every bus and charger available. Due to issues with charging equipment at garages, all eight electric buses were temporarily removed from service in July 2019 and then again in October. Because of this, three Gillig BRTPlus buses ordered for the A Line were temporarily placed into service on the C Line from July 2019 through January 2020. Additionally, five New Flyer XD60 buses were retrofitted with their fareboxes and Go-To card readers removed and repainted into METRO branding to be used on the C Line and A Line as necessary. While the electric buses returned to service late-October 2019, they were again removed from service in March 2021 until December 2021. Electric buses require long layovers to charge the buses midroute and due to Metro Transit's bus driver shortage, electric buses are used on a limited basis to allow for more operator availability. Only three electric buses are in use at one time and they are only used at most 8 hours at a time in a day rather than the up to 20 hours other buses are used.

== History ==
The Metropolitan Council, the metropolitan planning organization for the Twin Cities, completed a 2030 Transit Master Study for the region in 2008 which identified arterial bus network corridors and encouraged further study of arterial bus rapid transit projects. The study identified some corridors that had the potential for high ridership but lacked the necessary space for dedicated running way for transit. The Council set the goal of doubling transit ridership by 2030 in their 2030 Transportation Policy Plan and identified implementing arterial bus rapid transit as a method of increasing ridership. Metro Transit began study of 11 corridors for their potential for arterial bus rapid transit in 2011–2012 in their Arterial Transitway Corridors Study. Those 11 routes served 90,000 riders per weekday, which was close to half of the total ridership for urban routes. Ridership on implemented routes was predicted to increase 20 to 30 percent after the first year of opening. Corridors were evaluated on capital and operating costs, potential ridership, and travel time savings. At the time, an opening for the first BRT line was hoped to open in 2014.

The Penn Avenue corridor was not selected in this initial evaluation of 11 corridors in 2011-2012 because planning for the Metro Blue Line Extension proposed Penn Avenue as a possible alignment. The Penn Avenue alignment for the Metro Blue Line Extension project faced difficulties with constrained right of way and the need for eminent domain to take property. The alignment chosen traveled on Olson Memorial Highway and BNSF freight right of way. While the selected alignment avoided major disruptions along Penn Avenue, it almost completely avoided north Minneapolis. The city of Minneapolis agreed to the selected alignment in June 2012 with the understanding that two new bus rapid transit projects would be built from downtown Minneapolis, through north Minneapolis, to Brooklyn Center Transit Center.

An addendum to the Arterial Transitway Corridors Study released in January 2013 added the Penn Avenue corridor as well as extended the Chicago Ave corridor through north Minneapolis becoming the Chicago-Fremont corridor. The Snelling Avenue corridor was selected as the first corridor for implementation in 2012, with the A Line opening in 2016. After the B Line project was postponed so the corridor could undergo further study as the Riverview Corridor, both the Penn Avenue corridor and Chicago-Fremont corridor were selected as the next two priorities with the project named the C Line and D Line respectively. The C Line was selected as the region's second arterial bus rapid transit project in 2014. At the time Metro Transit believed construction could begin in 2016. The corridor already had strong transit usage with buses making up 2% of vehicle traffic on Penn Avenue but carrying 26% of people. There were however limited bus shelters or benches despite Route 19 carrying 7,000 daily riders.

On June 28, 2021, it was announced that an infill station, Osseo & 47th Avenue, would be built as part of Hennepin County's reconstruction of Osseo Road. The station would also be used by the Metro D Line. The original C Line plan included a station at Victory Memorial Parkway, later expanding the scope to 47th Avenue, but was shelved due to low ridership, physical restraints, and opposition from the Minneapolis Park Board. The removal of the station resulted in an uncharacteristically long 1.2 mi (1.9 km) gap between 43rd Avenue and 51st Avenue stations, in addition to rail yards creating a physical barrier to the north. The infill became planned because feedback received during the planning of both the C Line and D Line warranted inclusion of a new station. The station will be constructed with the roadway project beginning in 2023. Later 2021 an amendment will be released for the station plan.
