= Metro D Line (Minnesota) =

Bus rapid transit line

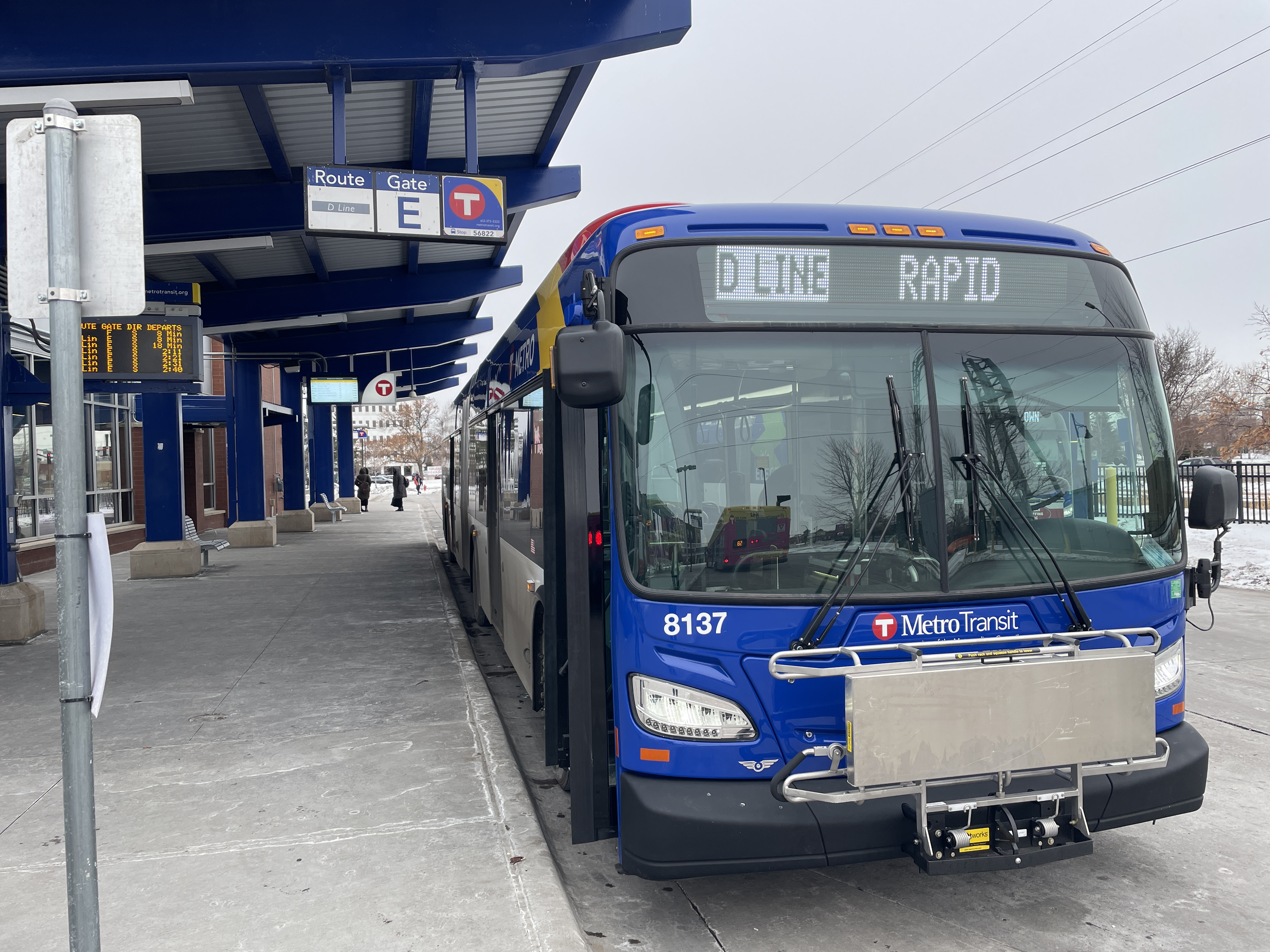
- Metro D Line bus at Brooklyn Center Transit Center.

Overview
- System: Metro
- Operator: Metro Transit
- Garage: Fred T. Heywood
- Vehicle: New Flyer XD60
- Status: Operational
- Began service: December 3, 2022; 3 years ago
- Predecessors: Route 5

Route
- Route type: Bus rapid transit
- Locale: Minneapolis–St. Paul, Minnesota
- Start: Brooklyn Center Transit Center
- Via: Emerson Avenue, Fremont Avenue, Chicago Avenue
- End: Mall of America
- Length: 18.5 mi (29.8 km)
- Stations: 40 (8 one-way station pairs)

Service
- Level: Daily
- Frequency: Every 10 minutes
- Operates: 4:00am - 1:00am
- Ridership: 13,550 (avg. weekday, 2025)

The Metro D Line is a bus rapid transit line in Minneapolis-Saint Paul, Minnesota. The 18.5-mile (29.8 km) route primarily operates on Fremont and Chicago Avenues from Brooklyn Center through Minneapolis to the Mall of America in Bloomington. As part of BRT service, the D Line features "train-like amenities" including improved station facilities, off-board fare payment, modern vehicles, fewer stops, and higher frequency. The current alignment would substantially replace the existing Route 5, the highest ridership bus route in Minnesota.

Portions of the local bus Route 5 were identified for bus rapid transit improvements by Metro Transit in 2013. Other corridors were developed first such as the Metro A Line which opened in 2016. Following an agreement by the city of Minneapolis to align the Metro Blue Line Extension away from the center of north Minneapolis, Metro Transit agreed to prioritize the Penn Ave and Emerson-Fremont Avenues corridors as next in line for project development. While the Penn Ave corridor became the Metro C Line, the Emerson-Fremont corridor was combined with the Chicago Ave corridor to make up the full extent of Route 5 and became the D Line. Project development began in 2017 and after some delays, full project funding was identified in 2020. Construction began in 2021 and the line opened on December 3, 2022.

== Background ==
The Metropolitan Council, the metropolitan planning organization for the Twin Cities, completed a 2030 Transit Master Study for the region in 2008 which identified arterial bus network corridors and encouraged further study of arterial bus rapid transit projects. The study identified some corridors that the potential for high ridership but lacked the necessary space for dedicated running way for transit. The Council set the goal of doubling transit ridership by 2030 in their 2030 Transportation Policy Plan and identified implementing arterial bus rapid transit as a method of increasing ridership. Metro Transit began study of 11 corridors for their potential for arterial bus rapid transit in 2011–2012 in the Arterial Transitway Corridors Study. Those 11 routes served 90,000 riders per weekday, which was close to half of the total ridership for urban routes. Ridership on implemented routes was predicted to increase 20 to 30 percent after the first year of opening. Corridors were evaluated on capital and operating costs, potential ridership, and travel time savings. At the time, an opening for the first BRT line was hoped to open in 2014. The A Line was selected as the first corridor for study in 2012 with the line opening in 2016.

The Chicago Avenue corridor was one of the original 11 corridors identified in the Arterial Transitway Corridors Study but it did not include the northern section of Route 5 which travels from downtown Minneapolis to Brooklyn Center Transit Center via Emerson and Fremont Avenues. An addendum to the study added the Penn Avenue corridor and the Chicago-Fremont corridor. The Chicago-Fremont corridor combined both the northern and southern portions of Route 5 together. While the original Arterial Transitway Corridors Study was ongoing, the Metro Blue Line Extension project was undergoing planning stages that could have placed the LRT line on Penn Avenue. The Penn Avenue corridor was determined to be too narrow and not possible without significant right of way impacts so the Metro Blue Line Extension alignment was moved to along Olson Memorial Highway and the BNSF freight corridor. This alignment would avoid most of north Minneapolis but the city of Minneapolis agreed to the decision in exchange for moving two bus rapid transit projects that travelled through north Minneapolis to Brooklyn Center Transit Center to the top of the development schedule. The Penn Avenue corridor was identified as the C Line and in 2014 became the second arterial bus rapid transit project to start development after the B Line project was postponed so the corridor could undergo study as the Riverview Corridor. The C Line opened in 2019.

The D Line became the third project to enter planning stages and in 2017 hosted open houses where Metro Transit estimated construction could start by 2020 if funding was secured. Later in 2017, the route was downgraded under the Metropolitan Council's Transportation Policy Plan from being funded under the "Current Revenue Scenario" to the "Increased Revenue Scenario" which means the project would only be built if funding is found. The city of Minneapolis passed a resolution in support of the project, partially in protest, but the Metropolitan Council defended the planning decision because at the time funding was not identified for the project. Governor Mark Dayton included $50 million for the D Line in his bonding bill request in 2018. Funding was again supported by Governor Walz and regional leaders in 2019 but did not secure funding in the state budget.

In October 2020, the project received full funding from the Minnesota Legislature with an anticipated opening date of late 2022. The $26 million contract to construct the line was approved in February 2021 by the Metropolitan Council. Construction began April 5, 2021, with an informal groundbreaking at Chicago and Franklin Avenues. Testing of transit signal priority and training for bus drivers operating the route were ongoing by early November 2022. The D Line opened on December 3, 2022, coinciding with the quarterly service change.

== Service ==
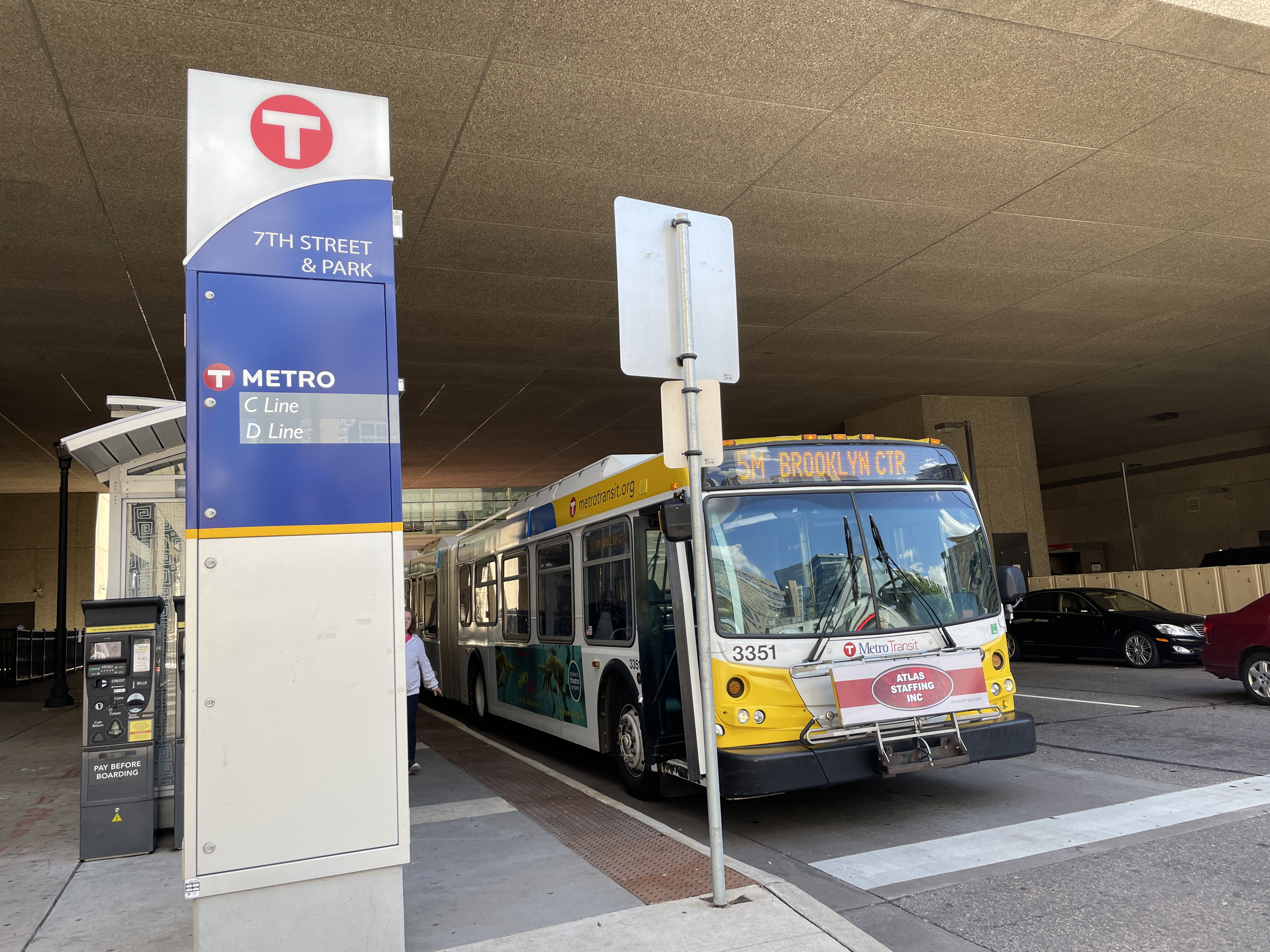
A Metro Transit Route 5 bus stopped at a current Metro C Line station and future Metro D Line station.

The D Line runs every 10–15 minutes on all days of the week. While Route 5 offered 24-hour a day service prior to the COVID-19 pandemic, the D Line only runs from 4:00 AM to 1:30 AM daily. Reduced frequencies are offered in early mornings or late evenings. Underlying service via Route 5, which continues to stop at every current bus stop, is still be offered even though 75% of riders currently board within one block of a station. Route 5 currently runs the length of the corridor but reduced in frequency to every 30–60 minutes and contract in length to just between Brooklyn Center Transit Center to the north and 56th St to the south. While the underlying service on the Green Line, A Line, and C Line was eventually suspended due to bus driver shortages, Route 5 will still be offered for at least the first few years of D Line service. Service will be retained to maintain travel options for those with limited mobility and to better understand ridership changes as Metro Transit expects most current riders of Route 5 to shift to the D Line. Branches on Route 5 that serve 26th Ave N and schooldays service to 44th and Penn Ave will be eliminated.

As part of service changes with the D Line, Routes 721 and 724 will not travel past Brooklyn Center Transit Center to downtown due to the marginal time savings over the D Line. Routes 39 and 133 which were suspended will be officially eliminated. Both routes will have comparable travel time as service on the D Line. A service equity analysis was completed as part of a Title VI of the Civil Rights Act of 1964 analysis found that the majority of residents in the area would receive an increase in transit service and that BIPOC residents would receive a greater increase than white residents.

== Route ==
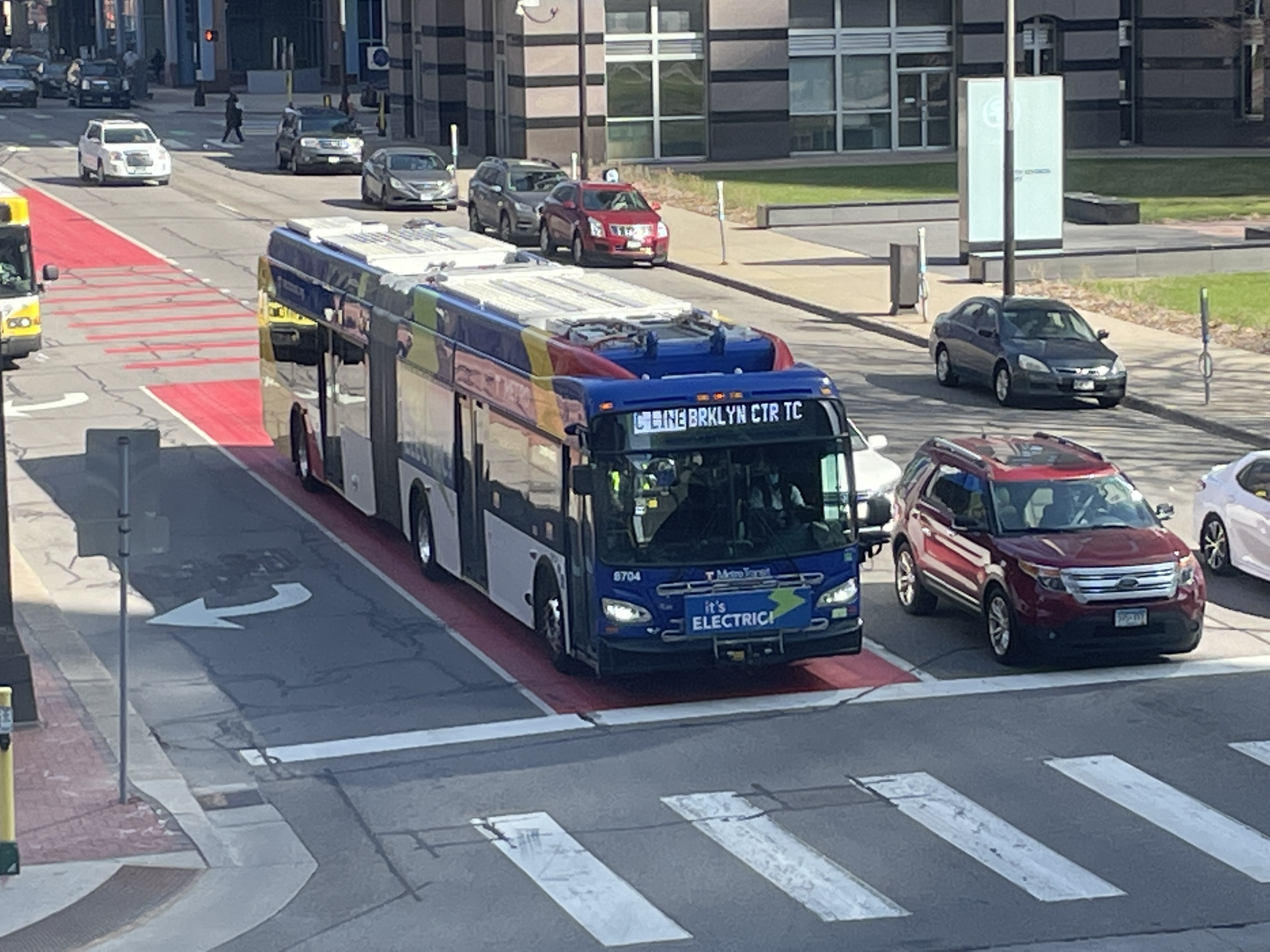
The D Line operates northbound on 7th Street in downtown Minneapolis within a bus lane installed in 2021, just like this C Line bus.

The D Line would travel north from Mall of America to downtown Minneapolis via American Boulevard, Portland Avenue, and Chicago Avenue. While in downtown Minneapolis, the route would travel on one-way pairs of 7th and 8th Streets, before traveling along 7th Street to Plymouth Avenue in North Minneapolis. From there, the route travels on the Fremont and Emerson Avenues one-way pairs before reconnecting on Lowry Avenue and continuing on Fremont Avenue. Once the route reaches 44th Avenue, it travels west and eventually follows the route of the C Line to Brooklyn Center Transit Center via Brooklyn Boulevard.

Plans include a station for the intersection of East 38th Street and Chicago Avenue, which is the site of the murder of George Floyd. A two-block stretch of Chicago Avenue was renamed George Floyd Square. However, upon receiving full funding for construction, Metro Transit decided to remove the station from construction at the time. Metro Transit will remain engaged with the community and the City of Minneapolis regarding the intersection's design in the future and the station will be constructed at a later time.

The line would largely replace Metro Transit's Route 5 which in 2017 provided 19,500 weekday rides. With over 120 northbound and southbound trips daily on Route 5, 23 buses were required to serve the line during peak periods.

== Infrastructure ==
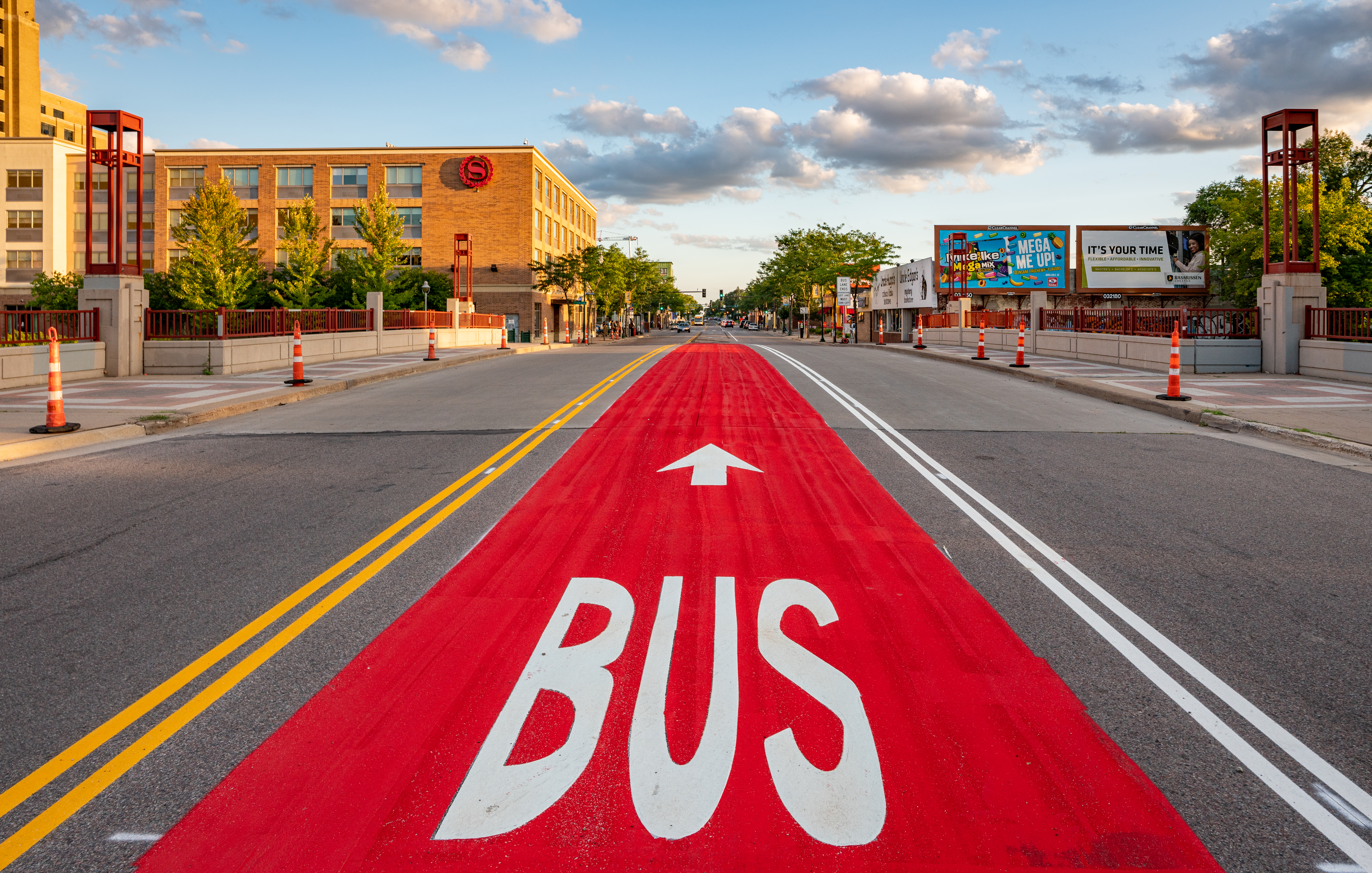
Red bus-only lane on Chicago Avenue, Minneapolis

The route primarily operates in mixed traffic but there are some segments with bus-only lanes. Northbound through downtown Minneapolis the route travels on 24/7 bus lanes on 7th Street which were created in 2021. A bus-only lane installed in 2019 also exists on Chicago Ave just north of Lake Street.

Plans for adding transit signal priority to 19 intersections on the north portion of the route and 12 on the south end were unveiled in 2017 with a planned opening in 2018. Construction of the D Line added to this total so by opening over 50 intersections have transit signal priority. Most intersections with transit signal priority are on the main trunk of Emerson Ave, Fremont Ave, or Chicago Ave. Signals extend green signal length or shorten red signals but do not preempt signals as emergency vehicles do.

Stations on the line have modular shelters with heat and light. Other features at stations are real-time transit information, and safety features like emergency phones and security cameras. Customers pay for their fares offboard buses using Go-to card readers or ticket vending machines at stations. Travel times are expected to be up to 25% faster than the Route 5 service the D Line primarily replaces.

== List of stations ==
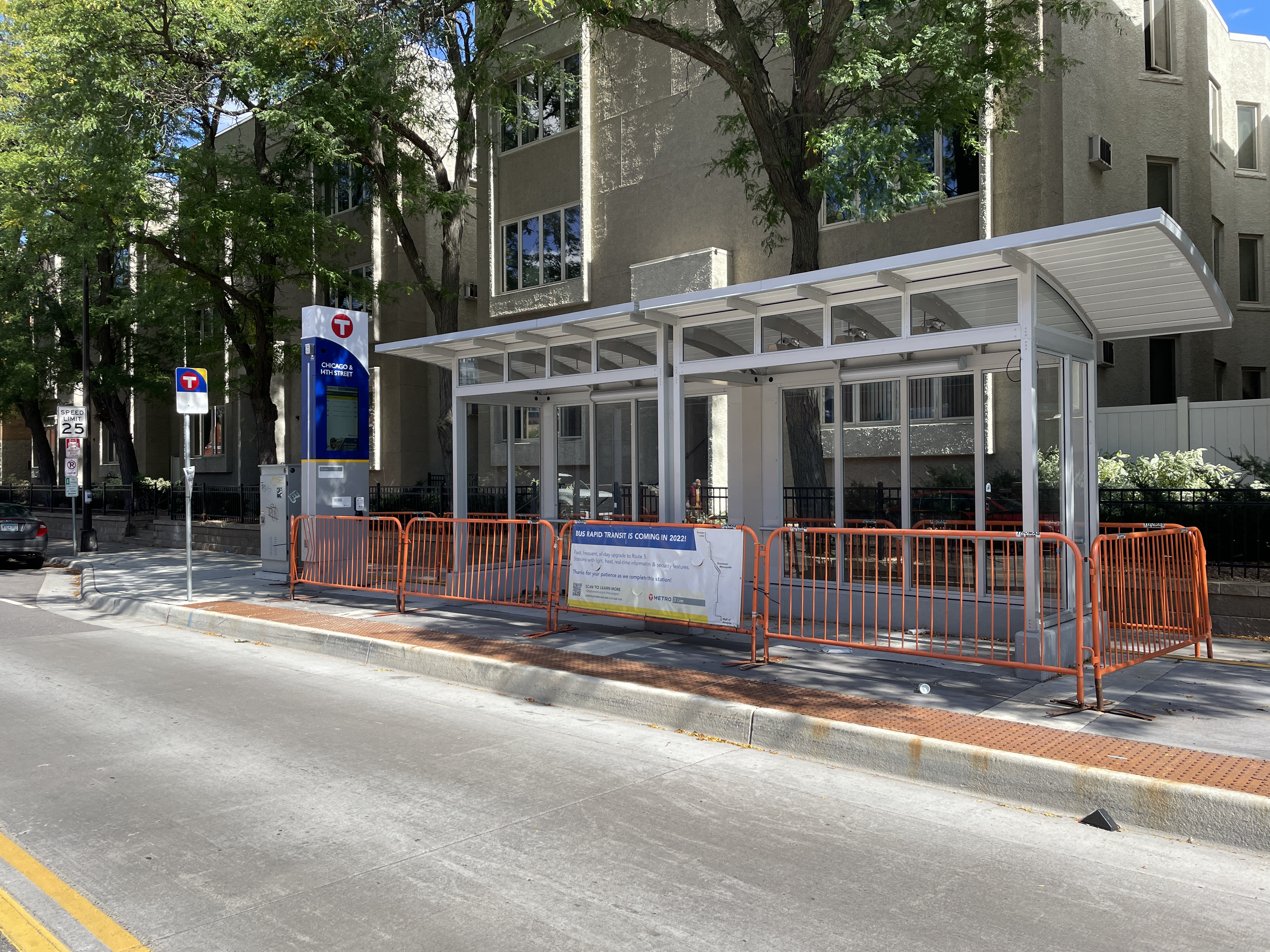
An under construction station at Chicago Ave and 14th Street.

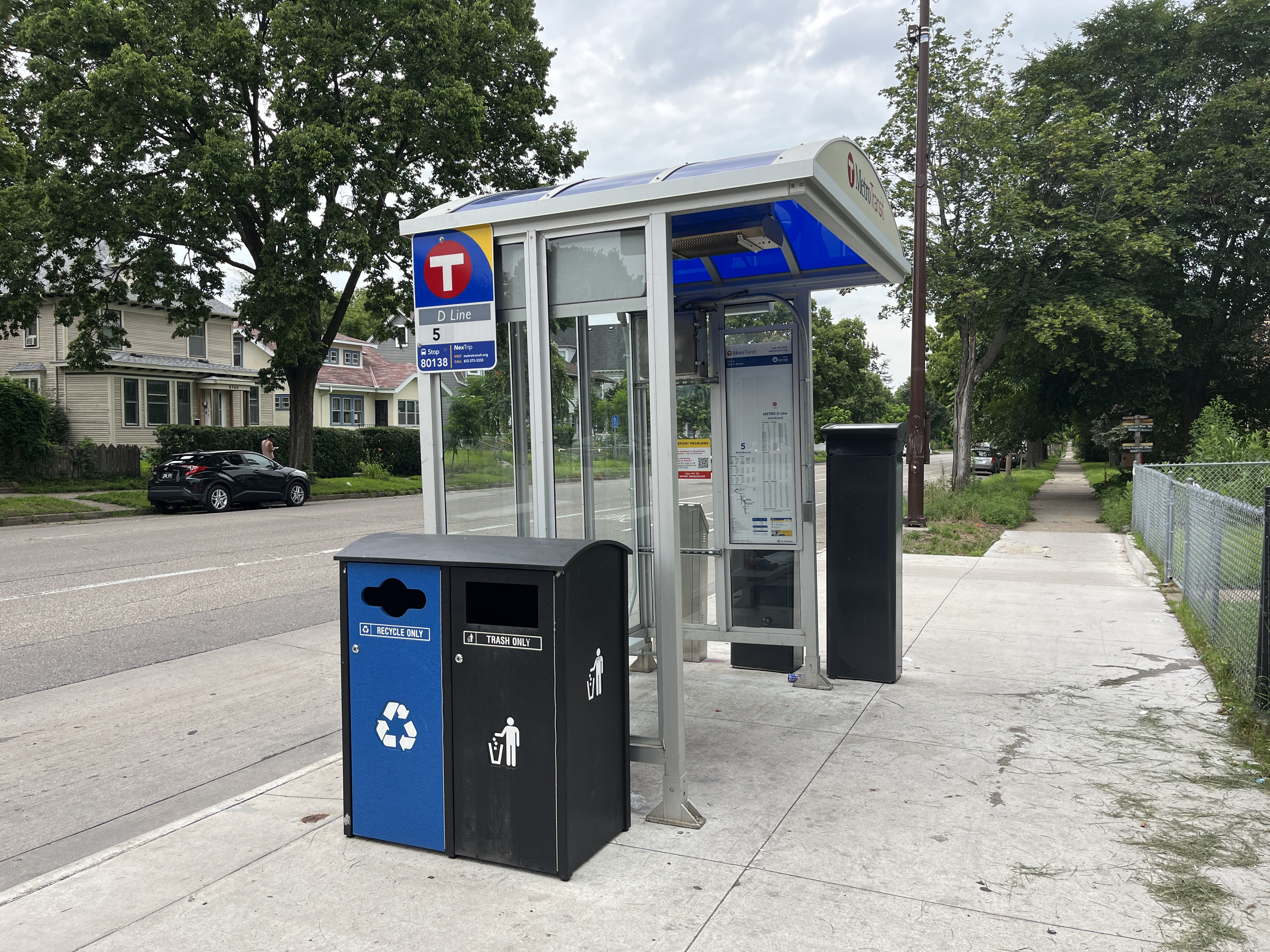
The temporary station at Park and 38th Street. The temporary D Line stations have similar amenities to the permanent stations.

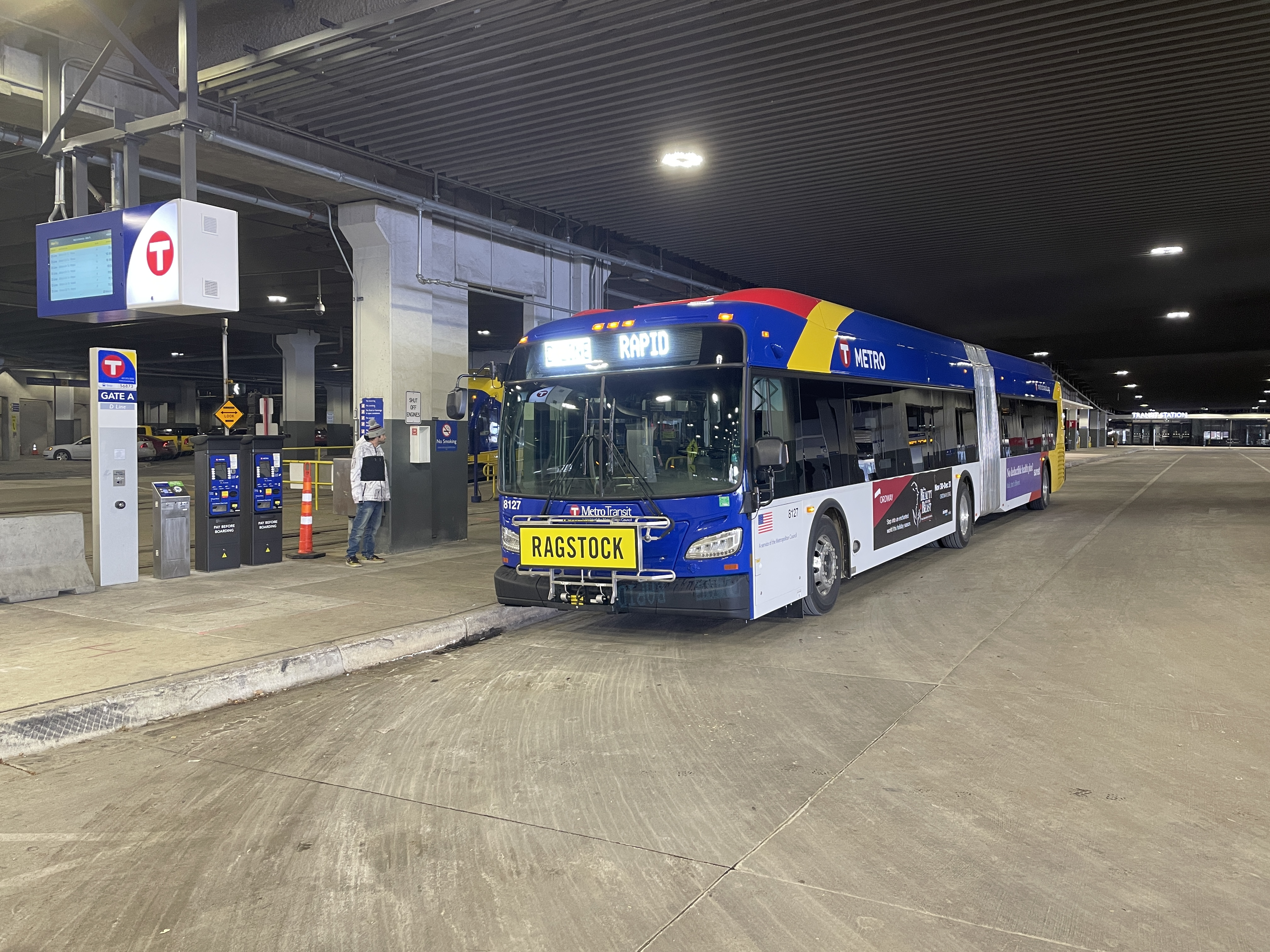
METRO D Line bus at Mall of America station in Bloomington.

| Station | | Neighborhood(s) | City | Opened | Connections |
|---|---|---|---|---|---|
| Brooklyn Center Transit Center | | Centennial | Brooklyn Center | December 3, 2022 | Routes 5, 22, 717, 721, 722, 723, 724, 761, 762, 801, Metro C Line |
| Xerxes & 56th Avenue | | Centennial | Brooklyn Center | December 3, 2022 | Routes 5, 22, 717, 761, Metro C Line |
| Brooklyn & 51st Avenue | | Happy Hollow | Brooklyn Center | December 3, 2022 | Routes 5, 22, 761, Metro C Line |
| Osseo & 47th Avenue | | Victory | Minneapolis | December 7, 2024 | Route 5, Metro C Line |
| 44th Avenue & Penn | | Victory | Minneapolis | December 3, 2022 | Route 5 |
| 44th Avenue & Girard | | Webber-Camden | Minneapolis | December 3, 2022 | Route 5 |
| Fremont & 42nd Avenue | | Webber-Camden | Minneapolis | December 3, 2022 | Route 5 |
| Fremont & Dowling | | Folwell, Webber-Camden | Minneapolis | December 3, 2022 | Route 5 |
| Fremont & 35th Avenue | | Folwell | Minneapolis | December 3, 2022 | Route 5 |
| Fremont & Lowry | Emerson & Lowry | Folwell, Hawthorne, Jordan | Minneapolis | December 3, 2022 | Routes 5, 32 |
| Fremont & 26th Avenue | Emerson & 26th Avenue | Jordan, Hawthorne | Minneapolis | December 3, 2022 | Route 5 |
| Fremont & West Broadway | Emerson & West Broadway | Jordan, Hawthorne, Near-North | Minneapolis | December 3, 2022 | Routes 5, 14, 30 |
| Fremont & Plymouth | Emerson & Plymouth | Near-North | Minneapolis | December 3, 2022 | Routes 5, 7 |
| 7th Street & Bryant | | Near-North, Sumner-Glenwood | Minneapolis | December 3, 2022 | Route 5 |
| 7th Street & Olson-5th Avenue | | North Loop | Minneapolis | December 3, 2022 | Route 5, 22, 755, Metro C Line |
| Ramp A/7th Street Transit Center (Note: Southbound service only) | | Downtown West | Minneapolis | December 3, 2022 | Many downtown routes |
| 7th Street & Hennepin | 8th Street & Hennepin | Downtown West | Minneapolis | December 3, 2022 | Many downtown routes |
| 7th Street & Nicollet | 8th Street & Nicollet | Downtown West | Minneapolis | December 3, 2022 | Many downtown routes, Nicollet Mall |
| 7th Street & 3rd/4th Avenue | 8th Street & 3rd/4th Avenue | Downtown West | Minneapolis | December 3, 2022 | Many downtown routes |
| 7th Street & Park | 8th Street & Park | Elliot Park | Minneapolis | December 3, 2022 | Many downtown routes |
| Chicago & 14th Street | | Elliot Park | Minneapolis | December 3, 2022 | Route 5 |
| Chicago & Franklin | | Ventura Village | Minneapolis | December 3, 2022 | Routes 2, 5, 9 |
| Chicago & 24th Street | | Midtown Phillips, Phillips West, Ventura Village | Minneapolis | December 3, 2022 | Routes 5, 27 |
| Chicago & 26th Street | | Phillips West, Midtown Phillips | Minneapolis | December 3, 2022 | Routes 5, 27 |
| Chicago & Lake Street | | Central, Phillips West, Midtown Phillips, Powderhorn Park | Minneapolis | December 3, 2022 | Routes 5, 21 |
| Chicago & 34th Street | | Central, Powderhorn | Minneapolis | December 3, 2022 | Route 5 |
| Park-Portland & 38th Street (Note: Temporary station. Future station planned to be constructed on Chicago Avenue at George Floyd Square.) | | Bryant, Central | Minneapolis | December 3, 2022 | Routes 5, 23 |
| Chicago & 42nd Street | | Bancroft, Bryant, Northrop, Regina | Minneapolis | December 3, 2022 | Routes 5 |
| Chicago & 46th Street | | Field, Northrop, Regina | Minneapolis | December 3, 2022 | Routes 5, 46 |
| Chicago & 48th Street | | Field, Northrop | Minneapolis | December 3, 2022 | Route 5 |
| Chicago & 52nd Street | | Hale, Page | Minneapolis | December 3, 2022 | Route 5 |
| Chicago & 56th Street | | Diamond Lake | Minneapolis | December 3, 2022 | Routes 5, 14 |
| Portland & 60th Street | | Diamond Lake | Minneapolis | December 3, 2022 | |
| Portland & 66th Street | | Richfield | | December 3, 2022 | Route 515 |
| Portland & 70th Street | | Richfield | | December 3, 2022 | |
| Portland & 73rd Street | | Richfield | | December 3, 2022 | |
| Portland & 77th Street (Note: Temporary station. Permanent station to be constructed in coordination with MnDOT.) | | Richfield | | December 3, 2022 | Route 540 |
| American & Chicago | | Bloomington | | December 3, 2022 | Route 542 |
| American & Bloomington | | Bloomington | | December 3, 2022 | Route 542 |
| American & Thunderbird | | Bloomington | | December 3, 2022 | Route 542 |
| Mall of America | | Bloomington | | December 3, 2022 | Routes 54, 415, 515, 538, 539, 540, 542, Metro Blue Line, Red Line |
