= Brooklyn Center Transit Center =

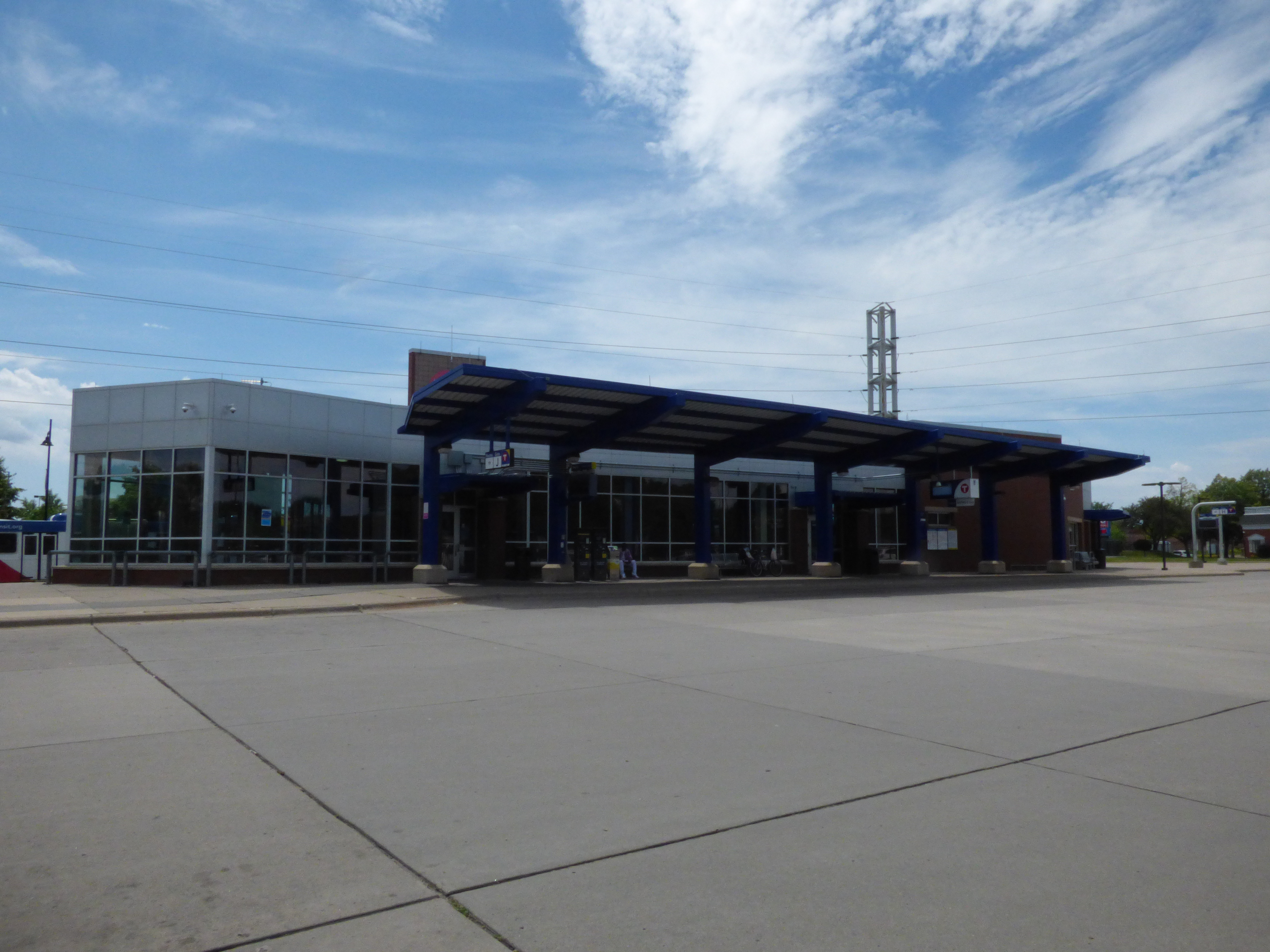
- Brooklyn Center Transit Center in 2020

General information
- Location: 2900 Bass Lake Road; Brooklyn Center, MN 55430
- Coordinates: 45°3′34.74″N 93°19′5.98″W
- Owner: Metro Transit
- Lines: C Line; D Line
- Connections: 5, 22, 717, 721, 722, 723, 724

Construction
- Parking: 10-minutes
- Cycle facilities: Yes
- Accessible: Yes

History
- Opened: December 4, 2004 (transit center); June 8, 2019 (BRT service)

Passengers
- 2019: 2,638 (average daily) ▼3.23%

Services
Preceding station	Metro	Following station
Terminus	C Line	Xerxes & 56th Ave toward 7th-8th Street & Park
Terminus	D Line	Xerxes and 56th Ave toward Mall of America
Location

Brooklyn Center Transit Center (BCTC) is a transit center in the Minneapolis suburb of Brooklyn Center, Minnesota. Owned and operated by Metro Transit, it is one of the busiest single boarding locations in the Twin Cities. The transit center is not a park and ride, but provides free 10-minute parking and free outdoor bike racks. June 8, 2019 Metro Transit's second bus rapid transit line, the Metro C Line, opened with Brooklyn Center Transit Center as the line's northern terminus. The Metro D Line opened in December 2022, also using the center as its northern terminus. The transit center opened December 4, 2004 and cost $1.9 million. Before opening of the C Line, charging stations were installed for end-of-the-line charging of 8 battery electric buses used on the C Line and D Line.

== Creation ==
Prior to the creation of the Brooklyn Center Transit Center, Metro Transit had a hub at nearby Brookdale Mall. In 2003, mall owner Jim Schlesinger, ousted Metro Transit from using Brookdale as a bus center hub. At the time, Metro Transit was running 4,000 passengers per day through Brookdale, and Schlesinger said that he would allow the mall to be a destination, but not a hub for ride transfers. He said he was not running a charity, and that bus riders hanging out at the mall waiting on ride transfers did not make good customers. His stance was that it was up to Metro Transit to build their own Brooklyn Center transit hub and not use Brookdale. Metro Transit subsequently opened the new Brooklyn Center Transit Center located offsite of the mall in December 2004. Brookdale Mall closed in 2010 and was largely demolished in 2012. The site has been redeveloped into a new shopping area named Shingle Creek Crossing.

== Renovation ==
In mid-2020 Metro Transit plans on renovating the 15-year-old transit center to provide a better experience for customers. Since the opening of the Metro C Line in June 2019, the transit center has seen an increase in traffic. In an interview, Metro Transit Spokesperson Howie Padilla said "When you have a transit center that's been used as much as this has, it can come to look used. It needs a facelift every once in a while."

The renovation is not funded as part of either the C Line or D Line projects, but through Metro Transit's capital improvements budget. Current plans call for replacement of concrete and crosswalks, as well as other accessibility improvements, additional lighting both inside and outside the facility, canopies for plazas at either end of the building, bench replacement, additional bike racks, a renovated waiting area and restrooms, and a renovated drivers' lounge. In February 2020, Star Tribune insinuated that a police substation would be added to the existing building, but there are no plans to construct police facilities. The renovation was expected to be complete late 2020, but ended up not being largely complete until May 2021.

== See also ==
- Metro
- C Line
- D Line
