= Eric Shogren =

Russian-American businessman

- Born: 16 January 1966 (age 59); United States
- Died: 24 December 2025; Minnesota, United States
- Known for: founder of New York Pizza and Kuzina
- Spouse: Olga Shogren

Eric Shogren (January 16, 1966 – December 24, 2025) was a Russian-American businessman, the founder of New York Pizza and Kuzina chains.

== Early life and career ==
His grandfather, an immigrant from Odessa, created a fruit market in the center of Minneapolis, and Shogren sold fruit with him from early childhood.

He was educated at the Blake School in Minneapolis.

In 1992, Eric Shogren arrived in Novosibirsk to his brother Brad, who studied here in one of the educational institutions of this city.

In Novosibirsk, he bought a hockey puck at a local store and was surprised by its cheapness. He decided to sell hockey pucks from Russia to USA, but this business failed.

His brother Brad introduced Eric Shogren to a Novosibirsk businessman; together they started exporting cars from America to Russia. In 1993, he earned money and opened the first supermarket in Novosibirsk. The new store sold products of the SuperValu and enjoyed great popularity among the residents of the city.

=== New York Pizza ===
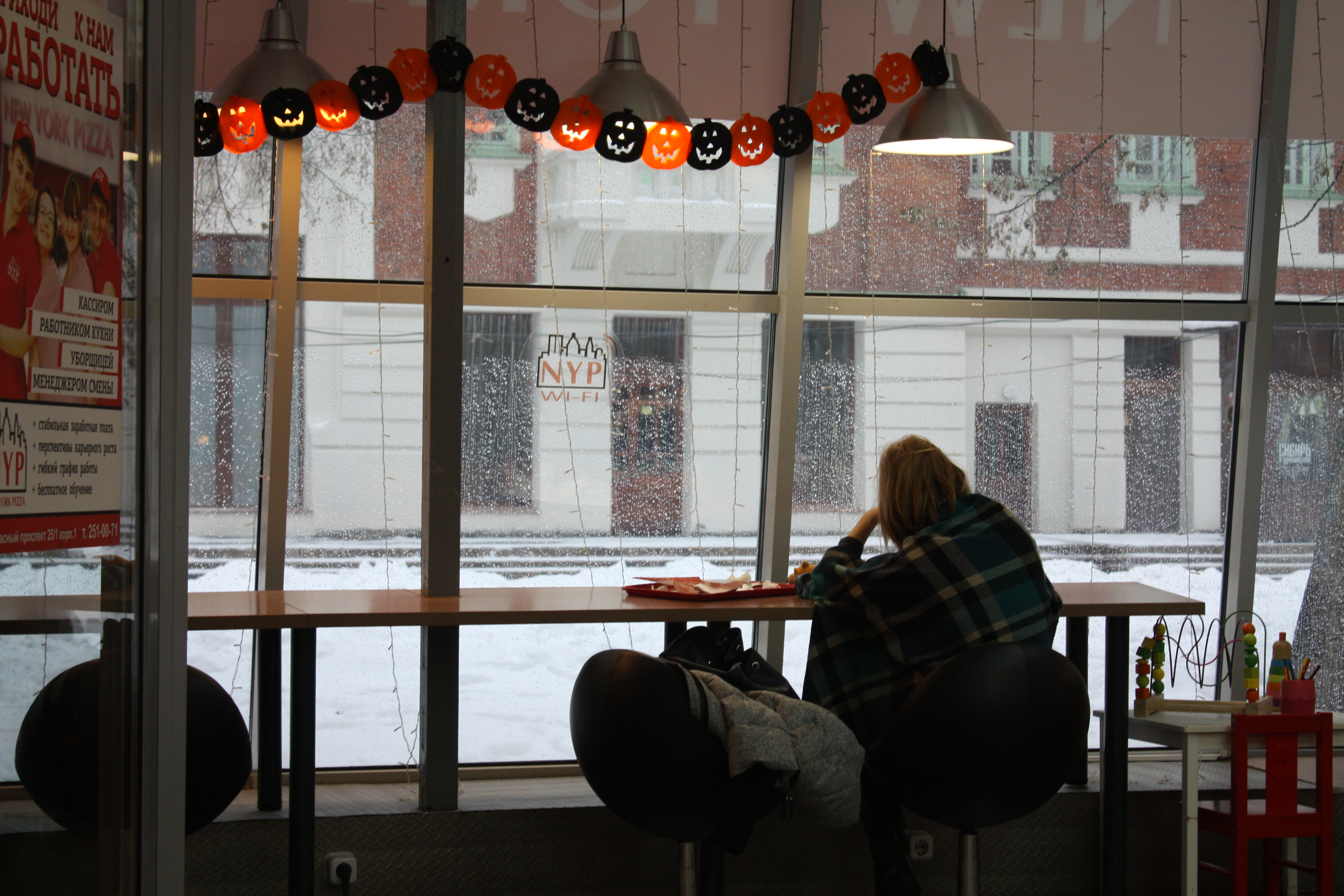
New York Pizza near the City Trade House

After the closure of the Novosibirsk supermarket, Eric Shogren returned to USA, where he met his future wife, Olga, originally from Novosibirsk, having come to the United States for an education. They were married and in 1995 moved to Novosibirsk, where in 1996 they founded The New York Pizza company. The New York Pizza later opened in other Russian cities.

After the founding of New York Pizza, Shogren continued to create other restaurants in Novosibirsk: New York Coffee, New York Diner and New York Times grill-bar, where rock-n-roll and blues musicians performed.

=== Klassika Restaurant ===
In 2000, Eric Shogren and a banker Igor Kim opened the Klassika Restaurant in Novosibirsk; the idea of its creation belonged to the Novosibirsk restaurateur Denis Ivanov (at that time, he was the director of the New York Pizza holding). In 2003, Shogren sold his share of the restaurant to Kim.

=== Siberian Farmer ===
In 2004, Shogren created the Siberian Farmer project. In 2005, his new company leased an area of 21 hectares in the Kochenyovsky District (Novosibirsk Oblast). He also planned to rent 900 hectares for 49 years for forage crops breeding, but this project failed.

=== Financial difficulties and criminal prosecution ===
In 2008, Novosibirsk workers of NYP held rallies to protest against delay wage. In February 2009, the company employees also organized a picket in the city, Eric Shogren arrived at the picketers. He said that the company wants to return money to people and that debts are gradually being paid to many former employees.

In April 2009, Shogren and the company's top manager Evgenia Golovkova were detained, but they were released on bail after 48 hours.

In August 2009, Eric Shogren organized a press conference, he told reporters that bankruptcy trustee Vladimir Klopov attempted to raider the NYP pizzeria located in Akademgorodok on Morskoy Prospect. Shogren also expressed the opinion that because of the raider seizure, the company lost one NYP in Pervomaysky Square of Novosibirsk and one pizzeria in Barnaul.

In 2010, a criminal case was opened against Eric Shogren and Evgenia Golovkova. They were accused of fraud. The prosecution stated that Shogren and Golovkova in 2006 persuaded their employee, Anna Sidevich, to issue a loan of one million rubles in the Bank of Moscow, promising to return her money.

In 2014, the Zheleznodorozhny District Court of Novosibirsk dismissed the criminal case against Eric Shogren and Evgenia Golovkova. The state prosecution asked to appoint Shogren and Golovkova five and a half years of probation, after which it immediately expressed a request for their release "due to the expiration of the statute of limitations" and expressed that the businessmen did not admit their guilt.

== Business after criminal prosecution ==
Despite the fact that many NYP establishments were closed, Eric Shogren kept his business. In 2015, Kuzina and New York Pizza chains was opened in Moscow.

=== Minnesota ===
Shogren returned to the United States and went on a buying spree in the Twin Cities metro: He purchase A Baker's Wife in south Minneapolis in 2016, the multi-location Wuollet Bakery chain in 2019, Emily's Bakery in Hastings, and Grandma's Bakery in White Bear Lake.

By summer 2024 his operations in Minnesota began to fall apart: Amid complains of declining quality at all Shogren's holdings, Wuollet locations in both Wayzata and Hastings (the latter was rebranded from Emily's) closed amid eviction proceedings, a Minneapolis Wuollet location had closed, Grandma's Bakery employee filed a court claims for unpaid wages, and Chicago's Byline Bank filed lawsuits against both Eric and his wife Olga Shogren for more than $1.3 million after they defaulted on two loans. Grandma's closed in 2023. The St. Paul location of Wuollet closed after 30 years in November 2024. The Wuollet's location in the 50th & France neighborhood closer in early 2025, after the landlord sued to evict the bakery for being delinquent on more than $150,000 in rent payments. The original (and only remaining) Wuollet location, an Uptown neighborhood institution since 1944, closed in September 2025 under Shogren's ownership.

== Death ==
Shogren died of a heart attack on December 24, 2025 at the age of 59. He is survived by his wife Olga and five children.
