= Metro E Line (Minnesota) =

Bus rapid transit line

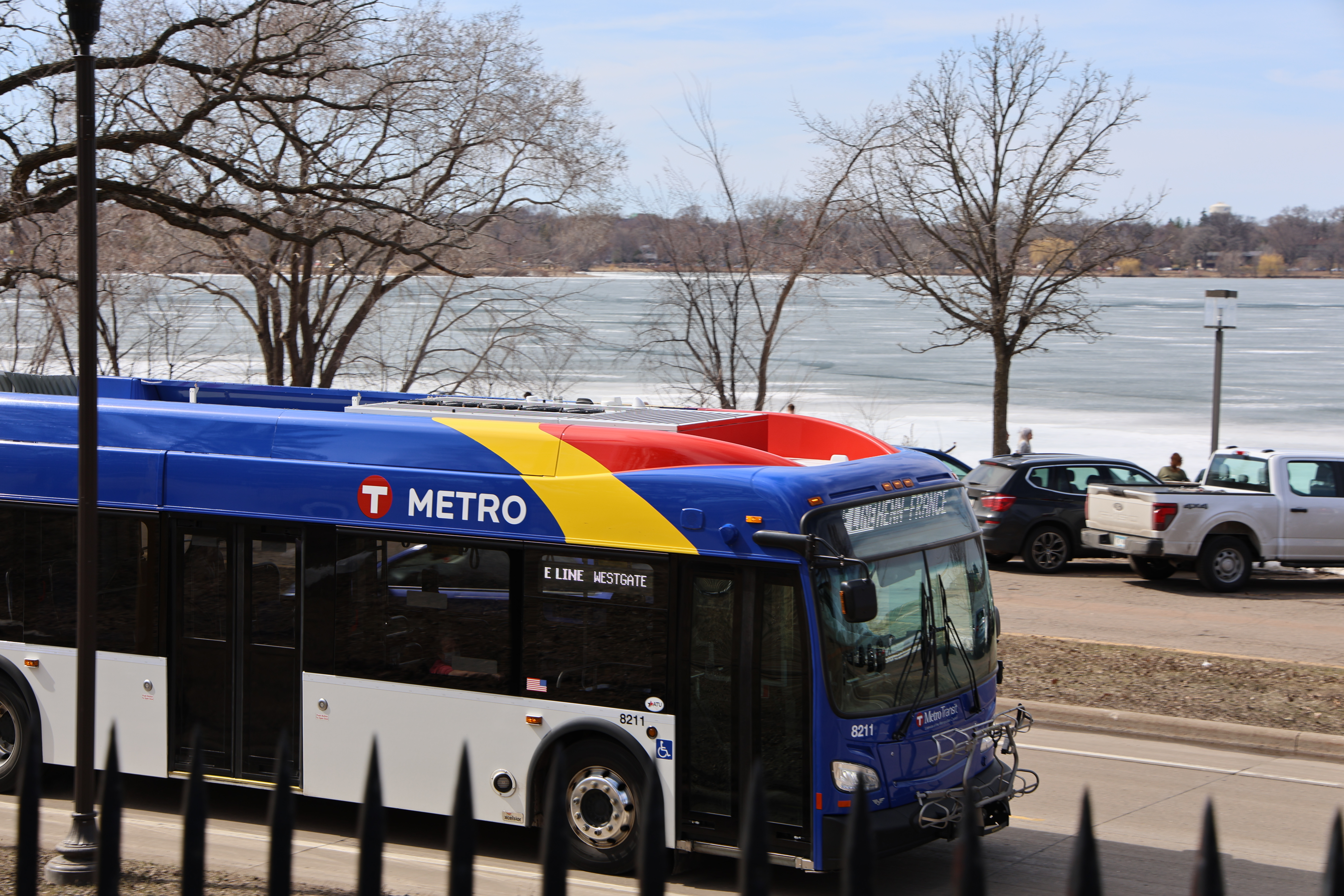
- An E Line bus traveling on Richfield Road between Bde Maka Ska and the Lakewood Cemetery in 2026.

Overview
- System: Metro
- Operator: Metro Transit
- Garage: North Loop; South
- Vehicle: New Flyer XD60
- Status: Operational
- Predecessors: Route 6 Oak-Harriet Streetcar

Route
- Route type: Bus rapid transit
- Locale: Minneapolis–Saint Paul, Minnesota
- Start: Southdale Center
- Via: France Avenue, Hennepin Avenue, University Avenue
- End: Westgate
- Length: 13.3 miles (21.4 km)

Service
- Ridership: 6,237 (avg. weekday, Feb. 2026)

The Metro E Line is a bus rapid transit route in Minneapolis, Saint Paul, and Edina in Minnesota. The route operates from Southdale Center Transit Center in Edina to Westgate station in Saint Paul. Running mostly on France Avenue, Hennepin Avenue, and University Avenue, the line serves major destinations such as Southdale Center, Fairview Hospital, 50th & France, Linden Hills, Uptown, Minneapolis Sculpture Garden, Downtown Minneapolis, Dinkytown, the University of Minnesota, and Prospect Park. The route has "train-like" features to speed up service and improve reliability, such as signal priority, bus lanes, all-door boarding, further stop spacing, and specialized vehicles. In 2019 planning and design was underway, with construction slated for 2023 and operations beginning a year later but that timeline was moved back. The E Line largely replaced Route 6 which carried 9,000 trips each weekday. The project was fully funded with $60 million by the state of Minnesota in 2021 and opened December 6, 2025.

== Service ==
E Line frequency
| Type | Span of service | Frequency |
|---|---|---|
| Early Weekdays | 4:30 a.m. – 10:30 am | 15–30 minutes |
| Weekdays | 10:30 a.m. – 7:00 pm | 10 minutes |
| Late Weekdays | 7:00 p.m. – 12:30 am | 15–60 minutes |
| Saturday | 5:30 a.m. – 12:30 am | 12–60 minutes |
| Sunday | 5:30 a.m. – 12:30 am | 12–60 minutes |

The E Line runs every 10 minutes during daytime service on weekdays and every 12 minutes during the weekends, with reduced frequencies of up to 30 minutes in the early morning and up to an hour in the late evening. As part of service changes with the E Line, route 6 was discontinued, with service south of Southdale Transit Center and on Xerxes Ave maintained by new route 36.

== Route ==
The route was identified in Metro Transit's 2014 Arterial Transitway Corridors Study as one of twelve local routes to be upgraded to bus rapid transit. The study concluded that the busiest portion of Route 6, on Hennepin Avenue between downtown Minneapolis and Uptown, should be upgraded with an extension connecting it to West Lake station on the upcoming Metro Green Line Extension. Since the release of the study, community members have expressed interest in having the upgrade cover more of the Route 6 corridor. In 2018 Metro Transit collected community feedback on 7 options south of Uptown and 3 options north of downtown Minneapolis.

=== Southern alignment ===
Metro Transit proposed seven alternatives for a southern alignment south of Uptown.

- Alternative 1 ended at 50th and France Ave via 44th Street.
- Alternative 2 ended at 50th and France Avenue via 50th Street and Xerxes Avenue.
- Alternative 3 ended at 50th and Xerxes Avenue.
- Alternative 4 ended at Southdale via Xerxes Avenue, 50th Street, and France Avenue.
- Alternative 5 ended at Southdale via France Avenue.
- Alternative 6 ended at Southdale via Xerxes Ave.
- Alternative 7 ended at West Lake station, same as the concept plan from the 2014 report.

Following feedback from the community, Metro Transit decided Alternative 4, 5, and 6 would advance for additional consideration and study.

Ultimately Alternative 5 was selected as the preferred alignment and was presented to the Metropolitan Council September 23, 2019, to be adopted as the recommended alignment. Reasons for choosing France Avenue over Xerxes was the ability to serve commercial nodes at 44th & France and 50th & France, and direct access to the Fairview Hospital campus.

=== Central alignment ===
From the start of the project it was known that the E Line would travel along Hennepin Avenue from Washington Avenue downtown to Uptown Transit Station. At the time of the Arterial Transitway Corridors Study, Route 6 buses were only in motion 39% of the time between Uptown Transit Station and 7th Street downtown. Average speeds were sometimes just 6 miles per hour. From Uptown Transit Center to Franklin Avenue during morning rush hours, buses carried 49% of people traveling in the corridor while only making up 3% of vehicles. During the evening rush hours, buses carried 45% of people traveling in the corridor and only 2% of vehicles. To help speed up service and improve reliability, the City of Minneapolis and Metro Transit partnered for a bus lane pilot on Hennepin Avenue between Franklin and Uptown in May 2018. The pilot removed on-street parking south of 26th Avenue for southbound buses and on-street parking north of 26th Avenue for northbound buses. There was a three-day test from May 15 to 17 to gather public feedback and better understand bus lanes.

After the pilot concluded, the bus lanes were removed and on-street parking was restored. The pilot received positive feedback, but neither the City of Minneapolis or Metro Transit had near-term plans to permanently implement bus lanes in the corridor. On September 7, 2019, painted bus lanes were permanently installed on Hennepin between Franklin Avenue and Lake Street, the first painted bus lanes in Minnesota. The same day painted bus lanes were also installed on Chicago Avenue, which operates the busiest bus route on the system, Route 5, and is planned for the METRO D Line. The improvement resulted in more consistent travel times and a reduction of travel times by 12 percent.

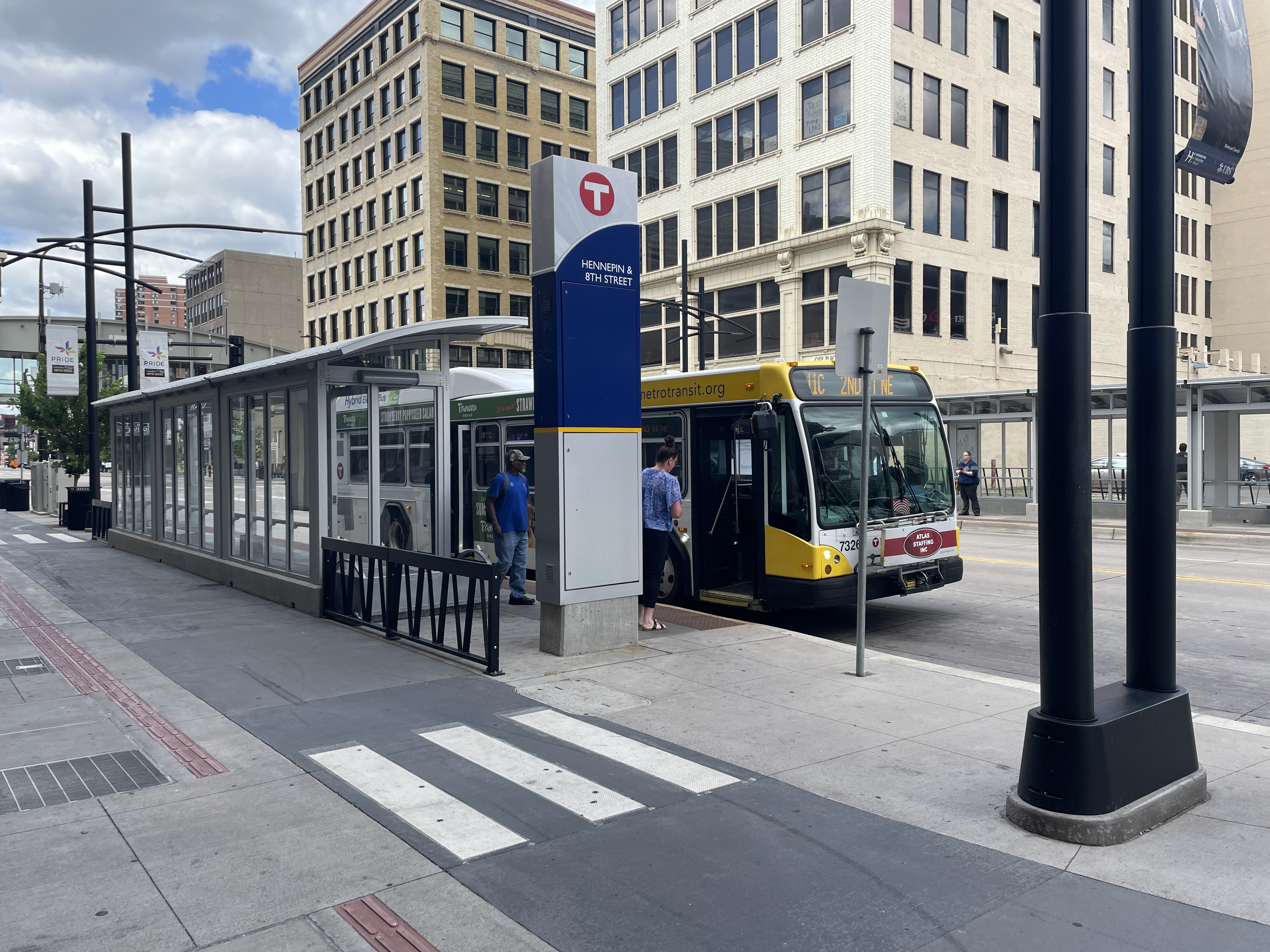
A future E Line station at Hennepin Ave and 8th St in the northbound direction.

In downtown Minneapolis enhanced stations are being constructed with the Hennepin Avenue reconstruction project. The approved project layout, currently under construction, includes four rapid bus stations at Hennepin & 3rd/4th Streets, 5th Street, 7th/8th Streets, and 10th/11th Streets.

=== Northern alignment ===
Metro Transit proposed three alternatives north of Washington Avenue in downtown Minneapolis. The first option had the route end near Washington Avenue in downtown. The second option took the route over the Mississippi River into Nicollet Island/East Bank before taking the University Avenue/4th Street pair into Southeast Minneapolis. The route would pass through the Marcy-Holmes neighborhood and Dinkytown, serving a large student population. The route would run along the northern edge of the University of Minnesota campus before terminating at Stadium Village station. The third option was identical to the second, but with an extension along University Avenue to Westgate station in Saint Paul.

The option into Southeast Minneapolis was selected as the preferred alignment, with the final terminus to be decided during the engineering phase in 2020.

== Stations ==
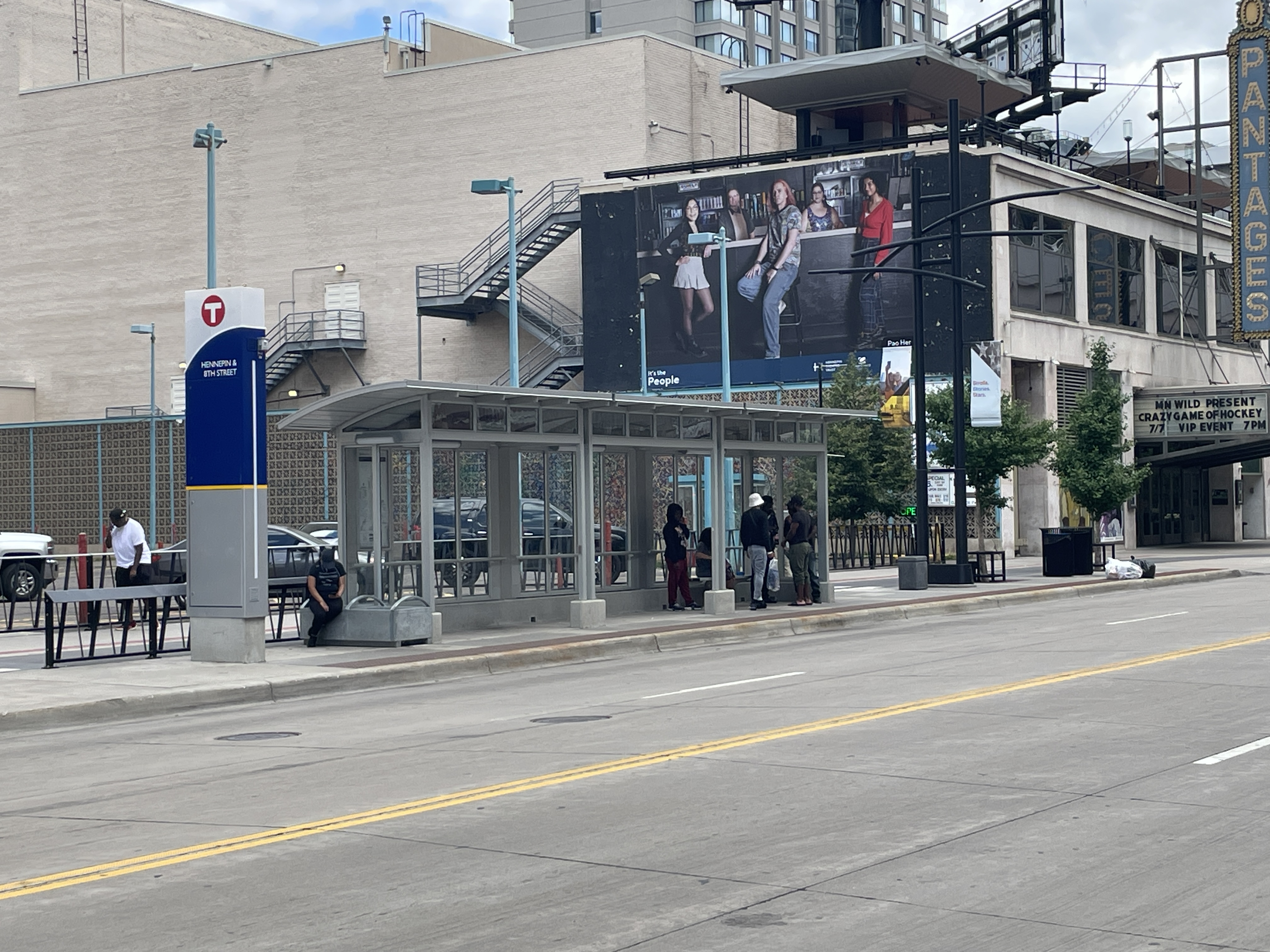
A view of the southbound future station at Hennepin Ave and 8th St from across the street looking into the shelter area.

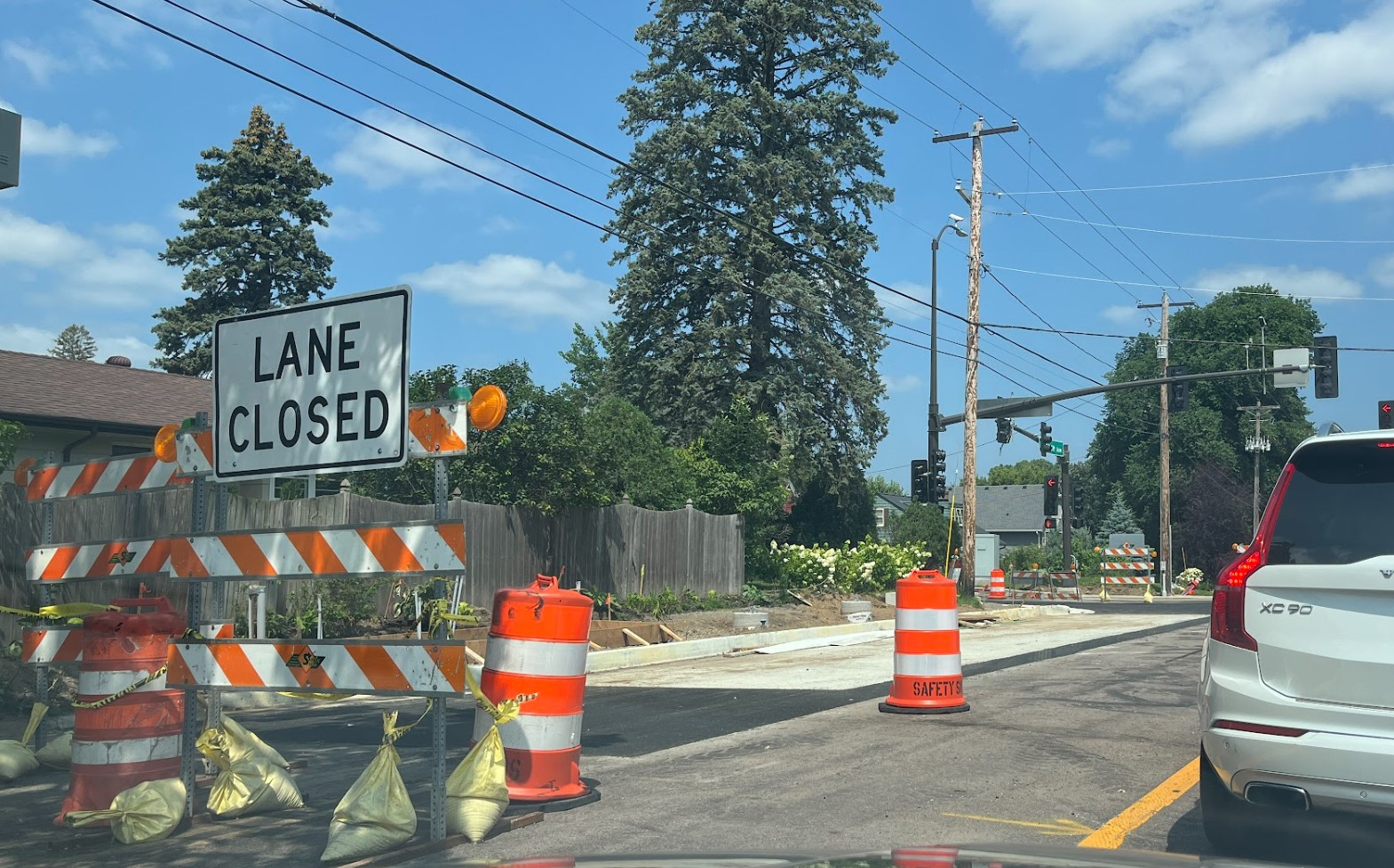
Southbound France & 58th Street station under construction.

Metro E Line station locations and connecting routes
| Station | | Neighborhood(s) | City | Connections |
|---|---|---|---|---|
| University & Berry | | Saint Anthony Park | Saint Paul | Routes 30, 63, Metro Green Line (Westgate station) |
| University & Malcolm | | Prospect Park | Minneapolis | |
| University & 27th Ave | | Prospect Park | Minneapolis | |
| University & 23rd Ave | | Prospect Park | Minneapolis | Metro Green Line (Stadium Village station) |
| University & U of M Rec Center | 4th St & Ridder Arena | University of Minnesota | Minneapolis | Route 2 |
| University & 15th Ave | 4th St & 15th Ave | University of Minnesota, Marcy Holmes (Dinkytown) | Minneapolis | Routes 2, 3 |
| University & 11th Ave | 4th St & 10th Ave | Marcy Holmes | Minneapolis | |
| University & 6th Ave | 4th St & 6th Ave | Marcy Holmes | Minneapolis | |
| University & Central | 4th St & Central | Nicollet Island, Marcy Holmes | Minneapolis | Routes 10, 17 |
| Hennepin & 2nd St NE | 1st Ave & 2nd St NE | Nicollet Island | Minneapolis | Routes 4, 11, 61 |
| Hennepin & Gateway | | North Loop, Downtown West | Minneapolis | Routes 4, 61 |
| Hennepin & 3rd/4th St | | Downtown West | Minneapolis | Many downtown routes |
| Hennepin & 5th St | | Downtown West | Minneapolis | Metro Green Line and Metro Blue Line (Warehouse District/Hennepin Avenue station), many downtown routes |
| Hennepin & 7th/8th St | | Downtown West | Minneapolis | Metro C Line, Metro D Line, many downtown routes |
| Hennepin & 10th/11th St | | Downtown West | Minneapolis | Many downtown routes |
| Hennepin & Spruce/Laurel | | Loring Park | Minneapolis | Route 4 |
| Hennepin & Groveland | | Lowry Hill, Lowry Hill East, Loring Park | Minneapolis | Route 4 |
| Hennepin & Franklin | | Lowry Hill, Lowry Hill East, Minneapolis | Minneapolis | |
| Hennepin & 25th St | | East Isles, Lowry Hill East | Minneapolis | Route 17 |
| Uptown Transit Station | | East Isles, Lowry Hill East | Minneapolis | Routes 36, 17, 21, 23, Metro B Line |
| Hennepin & 33rd St | | East Bde Maka Ska, South Uptown | Minneapolis | |
| Hennepin & 36th St | | East Bde Maka Ska, South Uptown, East Harriet | Minneapolis | |
| Richfield Rd & Bde Maka Ska South | | East Harriet | Minneapolis | |
| Sheridan & 39th St | | Linden Hills | Minneapolis | |
| Upton & 43rd St | | Linden Hills | Minneapolis | |
| 44th St & Abbott | | Linden Hills | Minneapolis | |
| France & 44th St | | Morningside, Linden Hills | Edina, Minneapolis | |
| France & 47th St | | White Oaks, Linden Hills, Fulton | Edina, Minneapolis | |
| France & 50th St | | 50th and France, Fulton | Edina, Minneapolis | Route 46 |
| France & 54th St | | Arden Park, Creek Knoll, Minneahaha Woods, Fulton | Edina, Minneapolis | |
| France & 58th St | | Minnehaha Woods, Chowen Park, Pamela Park | Edina | |
| France & 62nd St | | Pamela Park, Strachauer Park | Edina | |
| Fairview Southdale Hospital | | Southdale | Edina | |
| Southdale Transit Center | | Southdale Center | Edina | Routes 36, 515, 537, 538, 578, 600 |

== See also ==
- Metro A Line
- Metro B Line
- Metro C Line
- Metro D Line
- Metro Bronze Line
- Metro Gold Line
