= County Road 17 =

County Road 17 or County Road 17 may refer to:

- County Road 17 (Polk County, Florida)
- County Road 17 (Elkhart County, Indiana)
- County Road 17 (Anoka County, Minnesota)
- County Road 17 (Chisago County, Minnesota)
- County Road 17 (Hennepin County, Minnesota)
- County Road 17 (Scott County, Minnesota)
- County Route 17 (Monmouth County, New Jersey)
- County Route 17 (Allegany County, New York)
- County Route 17 (Cattaraugus County, New York)
- County Route 17 (Clinton County, New York)
- County Route 17 (Columbia County, New York)
- County Route 17 (Delaware County, New York)
- County Route 17 (Dutchess County, New York)
- County Route 17 (Essex County, New York)
- County Route 17 (Franklin County, New York)
- County Route 17 (Genesee County, New York)
- County Route 17 (Niagara County, New York)
- County Route 17 (Oneida County, New York)
- County Route 17 (Ontario County, New York)
- County Route 17 (Orange County, New York)
- County Route 17 (Oswego County, New York)
- County Route 17 (Otsego County, New York)
- County Route 17 (Putnam County, New York)
- County Route 17 (Rockland County, New York)
- County Route 17 (Schoharie County, New York)
- County Route 17 (Schuyler County, New York)
- County Route 17 (St. Lawrence County, New York)
- County Route 17 (Steuben County, New York)
- County Route 17 (Suffolk County, New York)
- County Route 17 (Tioga County, New York)
- County Route 17 (Warren County, New York)
- County Route 17 (Washington County, New York)
- County Route 17 (Yates County, New York)
