= Fairview Avenue station =

Fairview Avenue station may refer to:

- Fairview Avenue/Downers Grove station, a Metra commuter rail station in Downers Grove, Illinois, USA
- Fairview Avenue station (Metro Transit), a light rail station on the METRO Green Line in Saint Paul, Minnesota, USA
