= Kuzina (confectionery chain) =

Russian confectionery chain

- Founded: 2010
- Founder: Eric Shogren, Evgenia Golovkova
- Headquarters: Novosibirsk, Russia
- Products: pastry, sandwiches, coffee
- Website: kuzina.ru

Kuzina is a confectionery chain founded in 2010. Its headquarter is located in Novosibirsk, Russia. The company sells pastry, sandwiches and coffee. The largest number of stores are located in Novosibirsk, there are also shops in Barnaul, Moscow and Minnesota.

== History ==
The company was founded in 2003 by Russian-American entrepreneur Eric Shogren and Evgenia Golovkova. Initially, canteens were opened in Novosibirsk under the Kuzina brand, but in 2008, during the Great Recession, the canteen chain stopped working.

In 2010, the first confectionery was opened in Novosibirsk under the Kuzina brand. The design has changed significantly: black began to dominate in the decoration etc.

In 2013, the company opened one confectionery in Barnaul.

In 2015, Kuzina opened the first confectionery in Moscow near Aeroport Metro Station.

In 2016, Eric Shogren bought Baker's Wife Confectionery near Minneapolis. In 2017, the building of the former Baker's Wife was occupied by Kuzina.

== Locations ==
=== Russia ===
- Novosibirsk – 29
- Moscow – 7
- Barnaul – 1

=== United States ===
- Minnesota (near St. Paul) – 1 (Now closed)

== Gallery ==
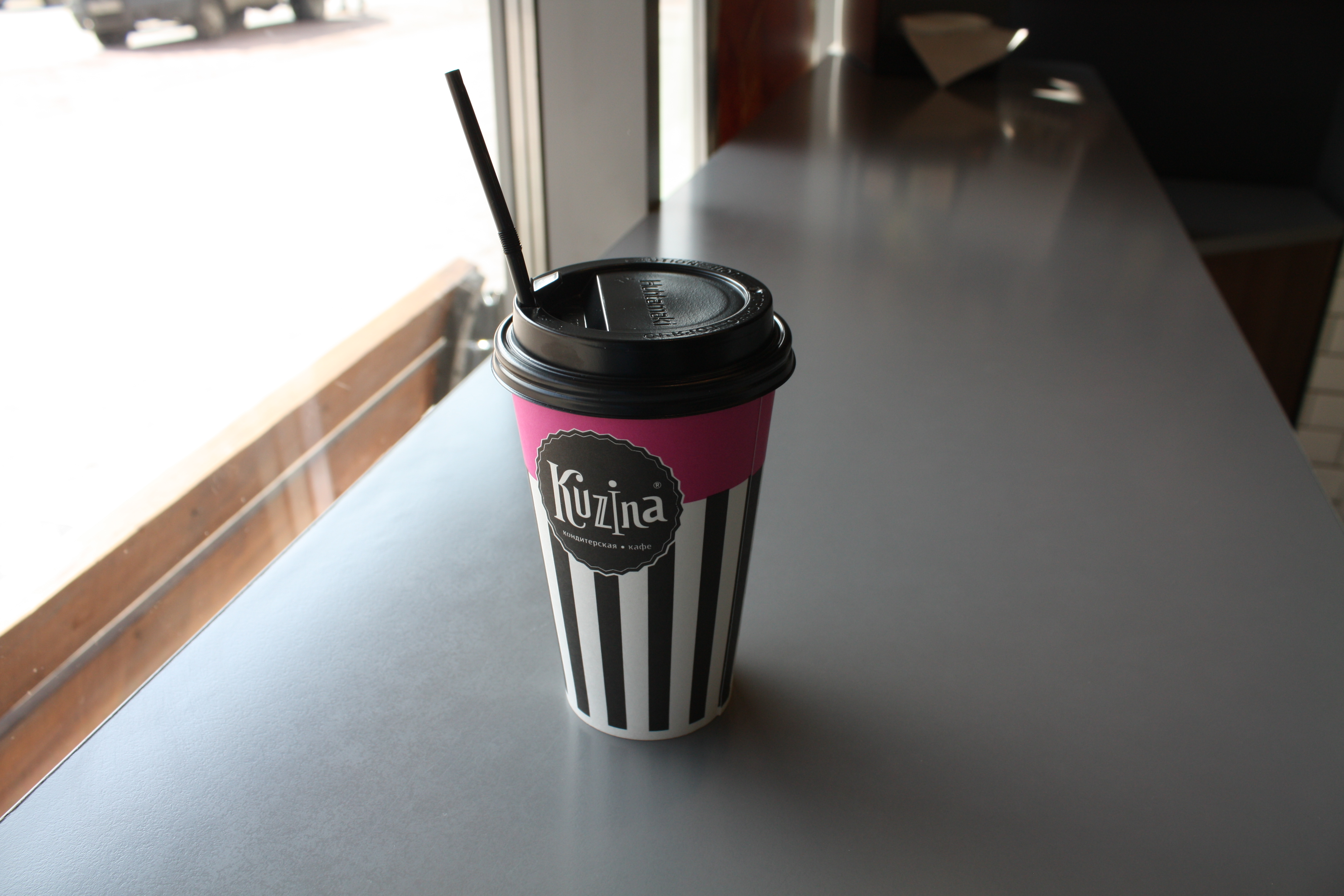

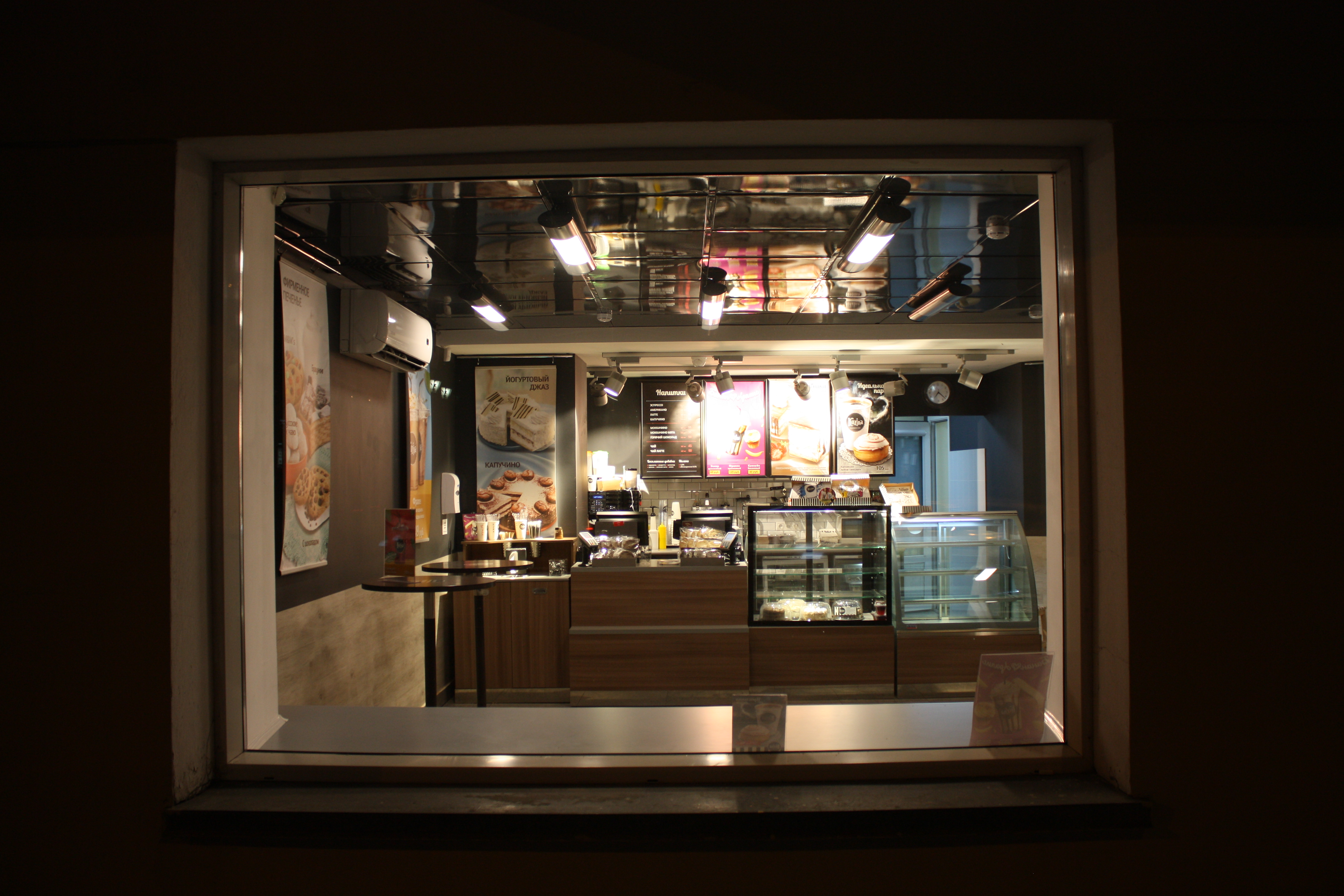
Kuzina at night, Kuzbassugol Building Complex

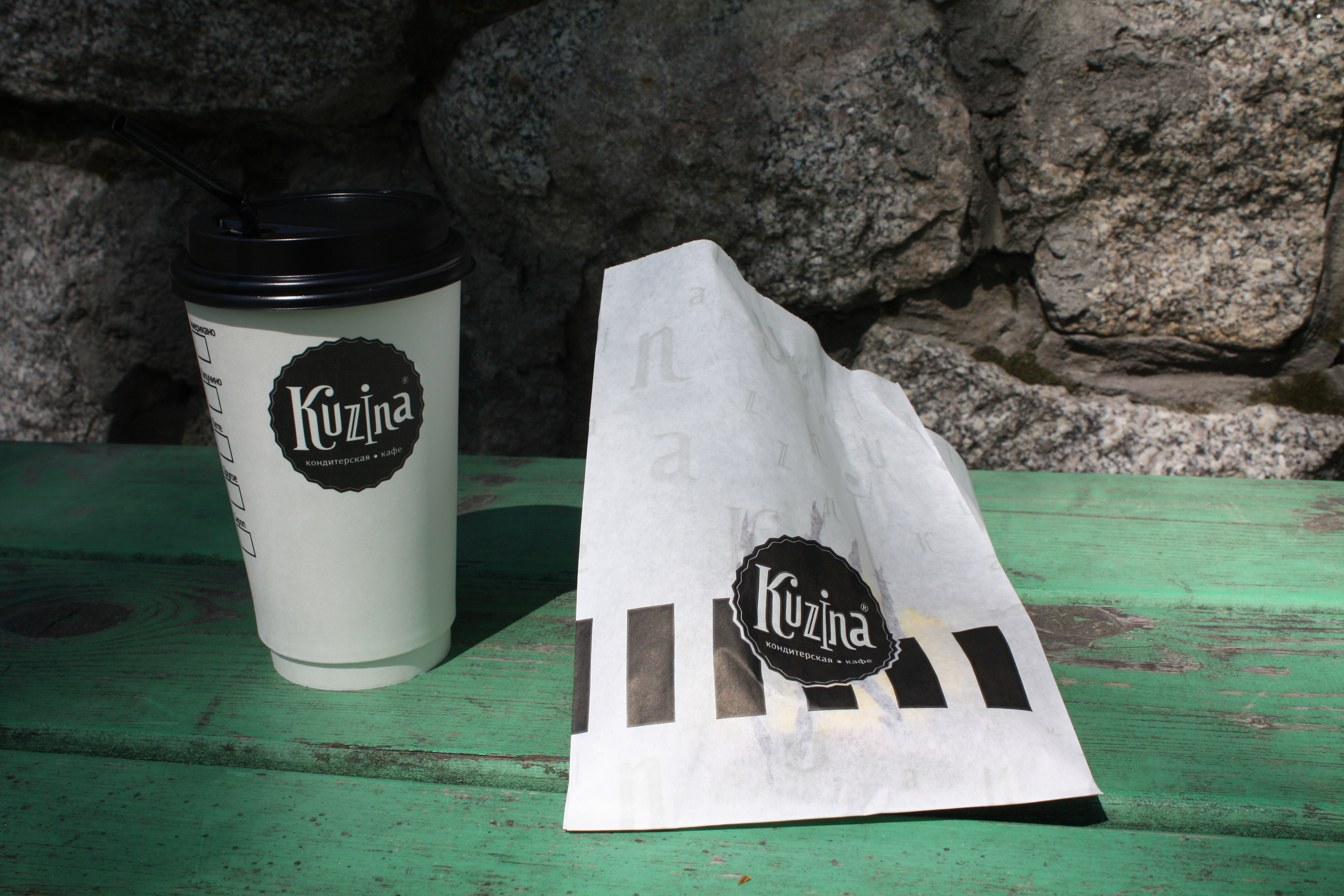

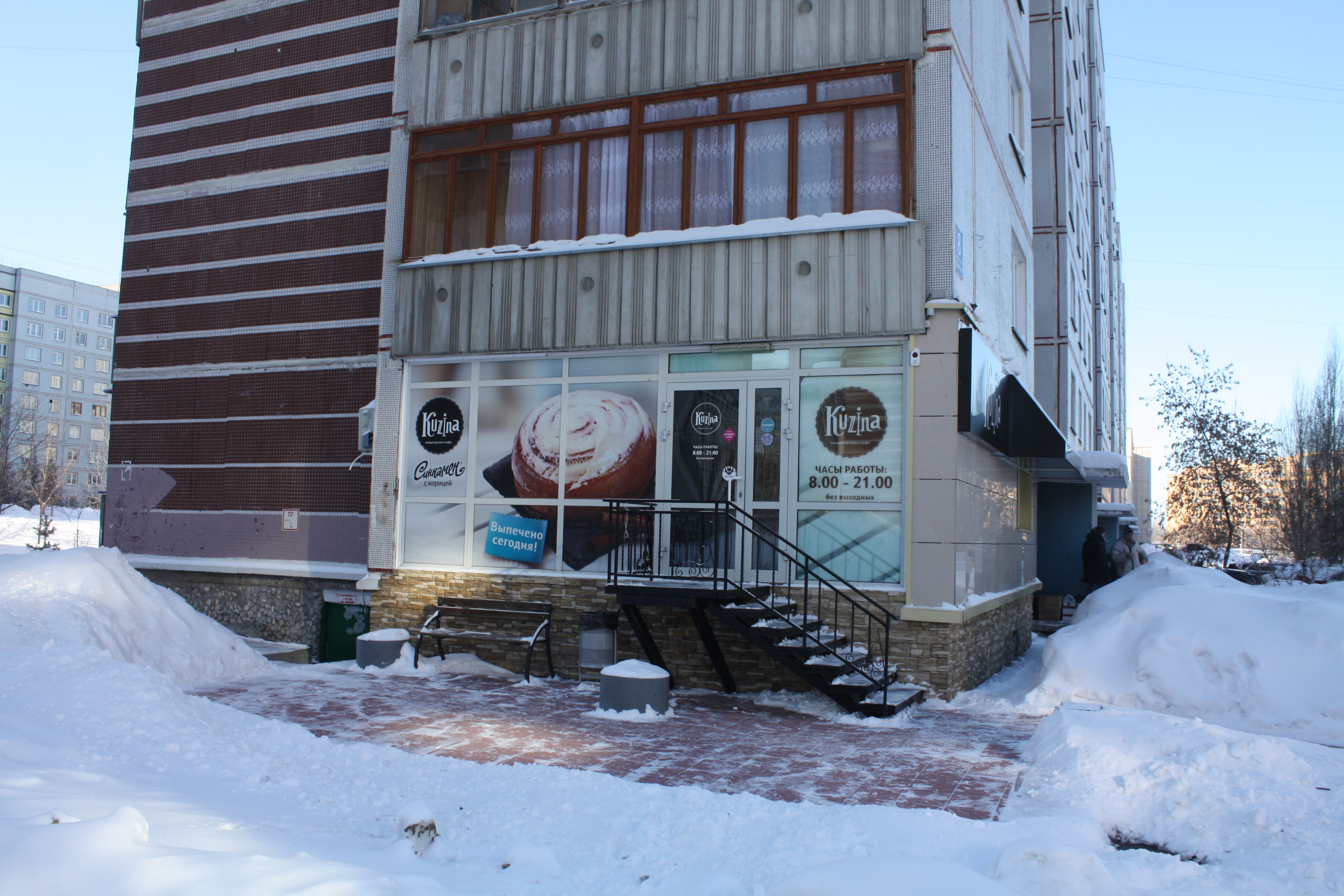

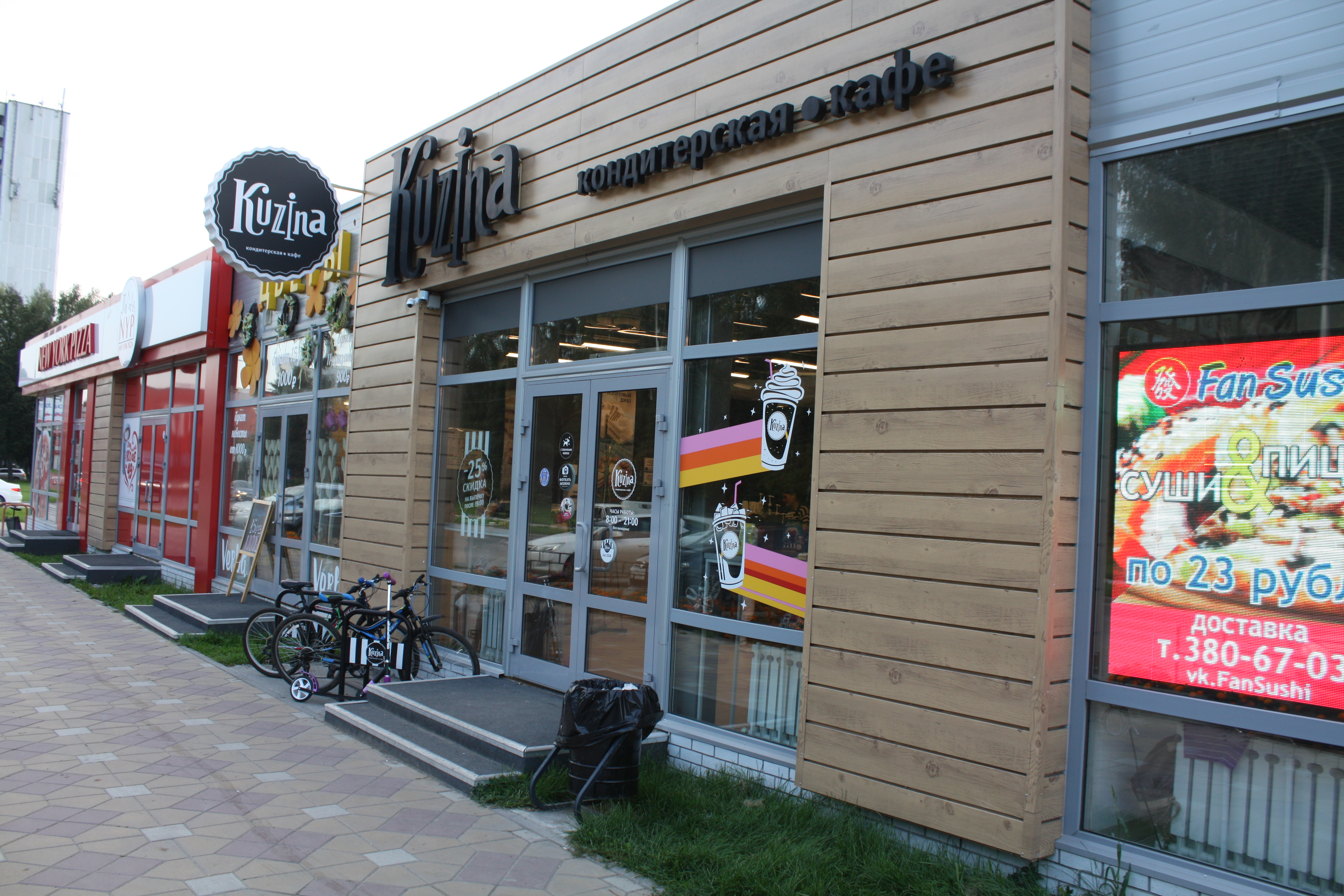
Kuzina in Krasnoobsk

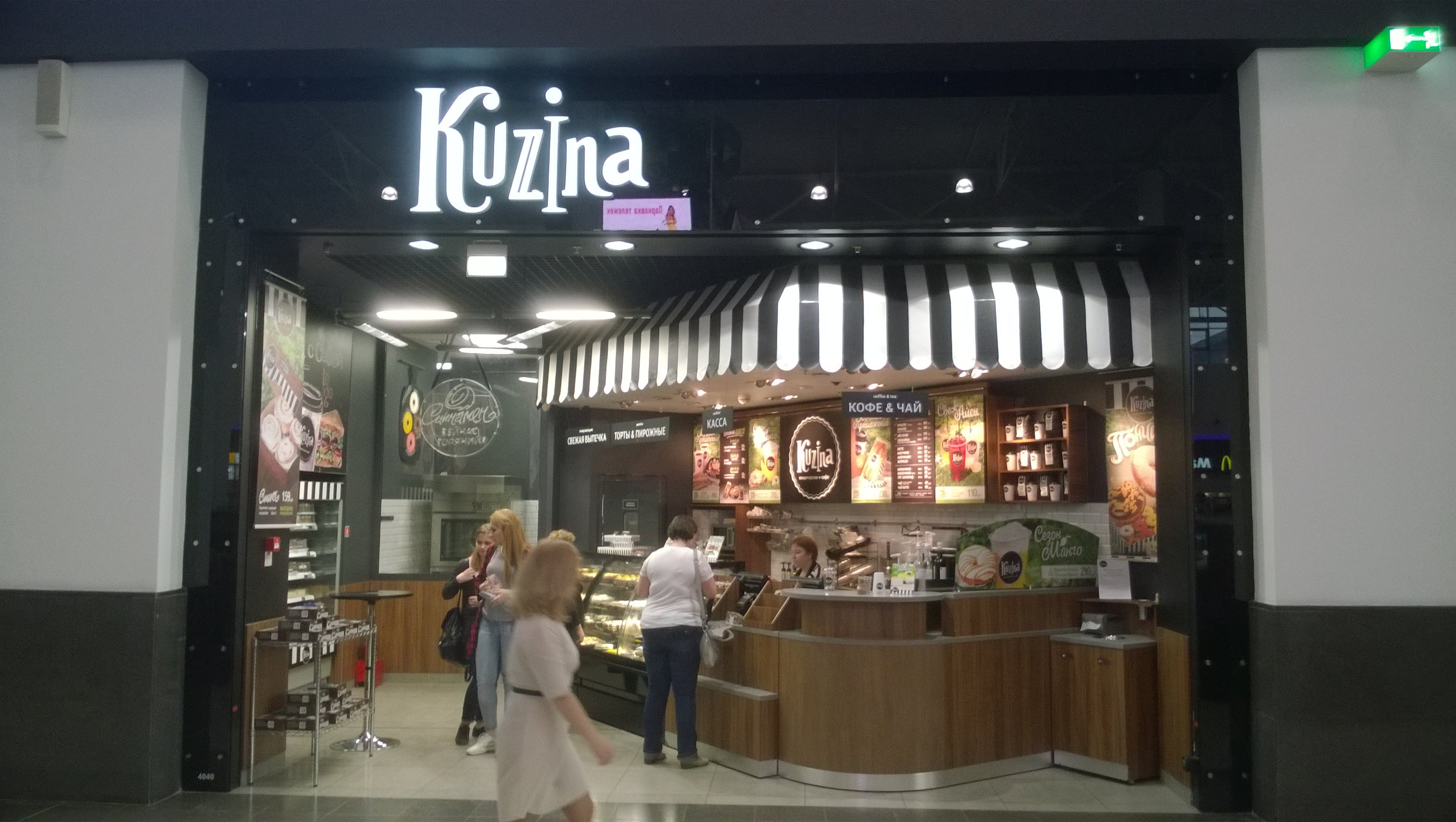

== See also ==
- New York Pizza
