= Raymond Avenue station =

Light rail station in Saint Paul, Minnesota

Raymond Avenue
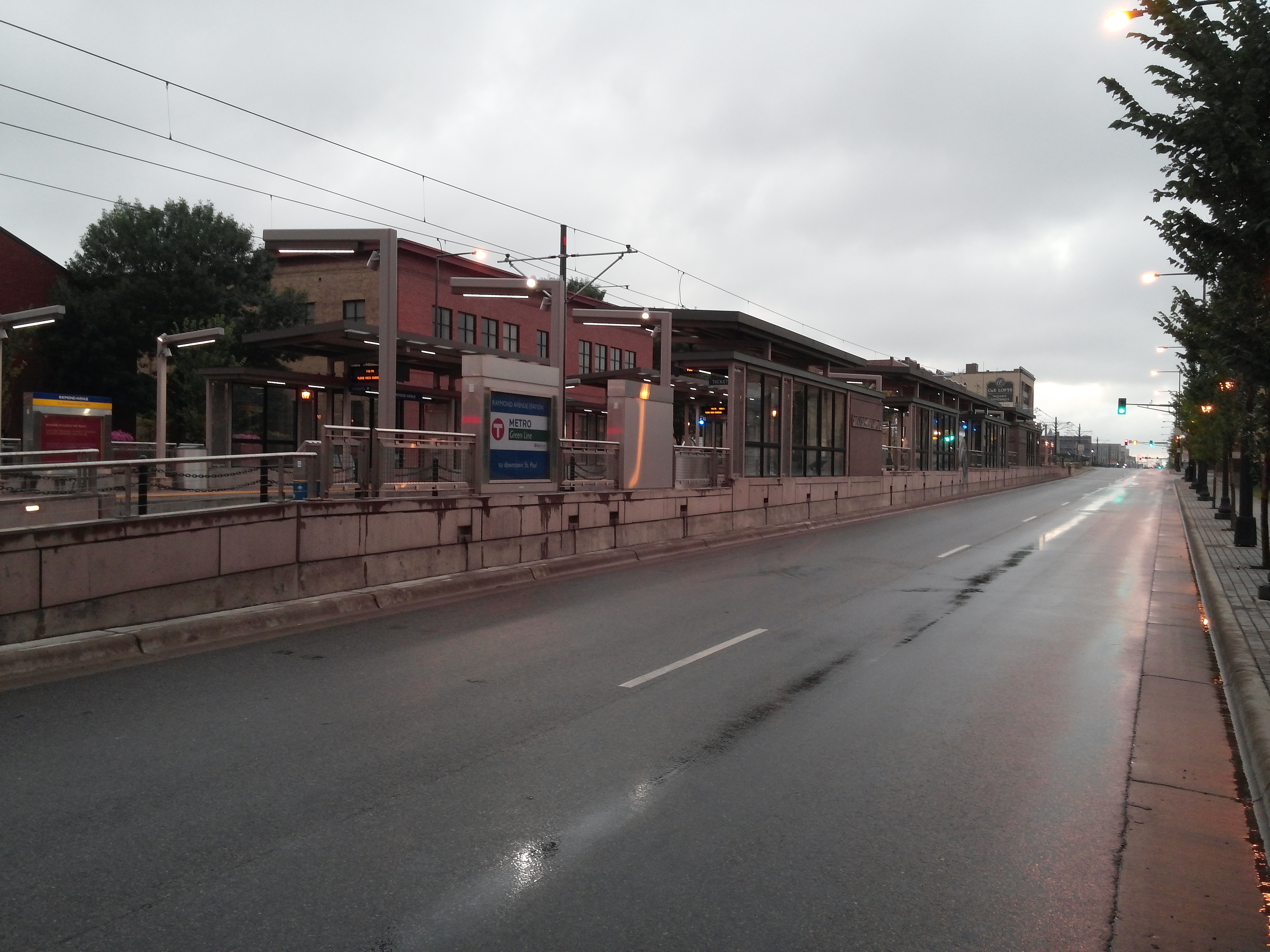
- Raymond Avenue station platform in August 2014

General information
- Location: 2305 University Avenue West; Saint Paul, Minnesota
- Coordinates: 44°57′47″N 93°11′43″W
- Owner: Metro Transit
- Platforms: 1 island platforms
- Tracks: 2
- Connections: Metro Transit: 63, 67, 87

Construction
- Structure type: At-grade
- Cycle facilities: Nice Ride station
- Accessible: Yes

History
- Opened: June 14, 2014

Passengers
- 2025: 829 daily ▼3%
- Rank: 22 out of 37

Services
Preceding station	Metro	Following station
Westgate toward Target Field	Green Line	Fairview Avenue toward Saint Paul Union Depot
Location

Raymond Avenue station is a light rail station along the Metro Green Line in Saint Paul, Minnesota. It is located a block east of the intersection of Raymond Avenue with University Avenue, between Carleton Street and La Salle Street.

Construction in this area began in March 2011. The station opened along with the rest of the line in 2014.
