= New York Pizza (restaurant chain) =

Russian pizza restaurant chain

- Founded: 1996
- Founder: Eric Shogren, Olga Shogren
- Headquarters: Novosibirsk, Russia
- Products: pizza, quesadilla, french fries, beer, tea, coffee

New York Pizza is a Russian pizza restaurant chain headquartered in Novosibirsk, Russia. It was founded in 1996. The company sells pizza, quesadilla, french fries, beer etc.

== History ==
The company was founded in Novosibirsk by Russian-American entrepreneur Eric Shogren and his wife Olga. The first restaurant opened in Zheleznodorozhny District of Novosibirsk on Dimitrov Prospekt in 1996.

In 2015, New York Pizza opened the first restaurant in Moscow and the third restaurant in Barnaul.

== Gallery ==
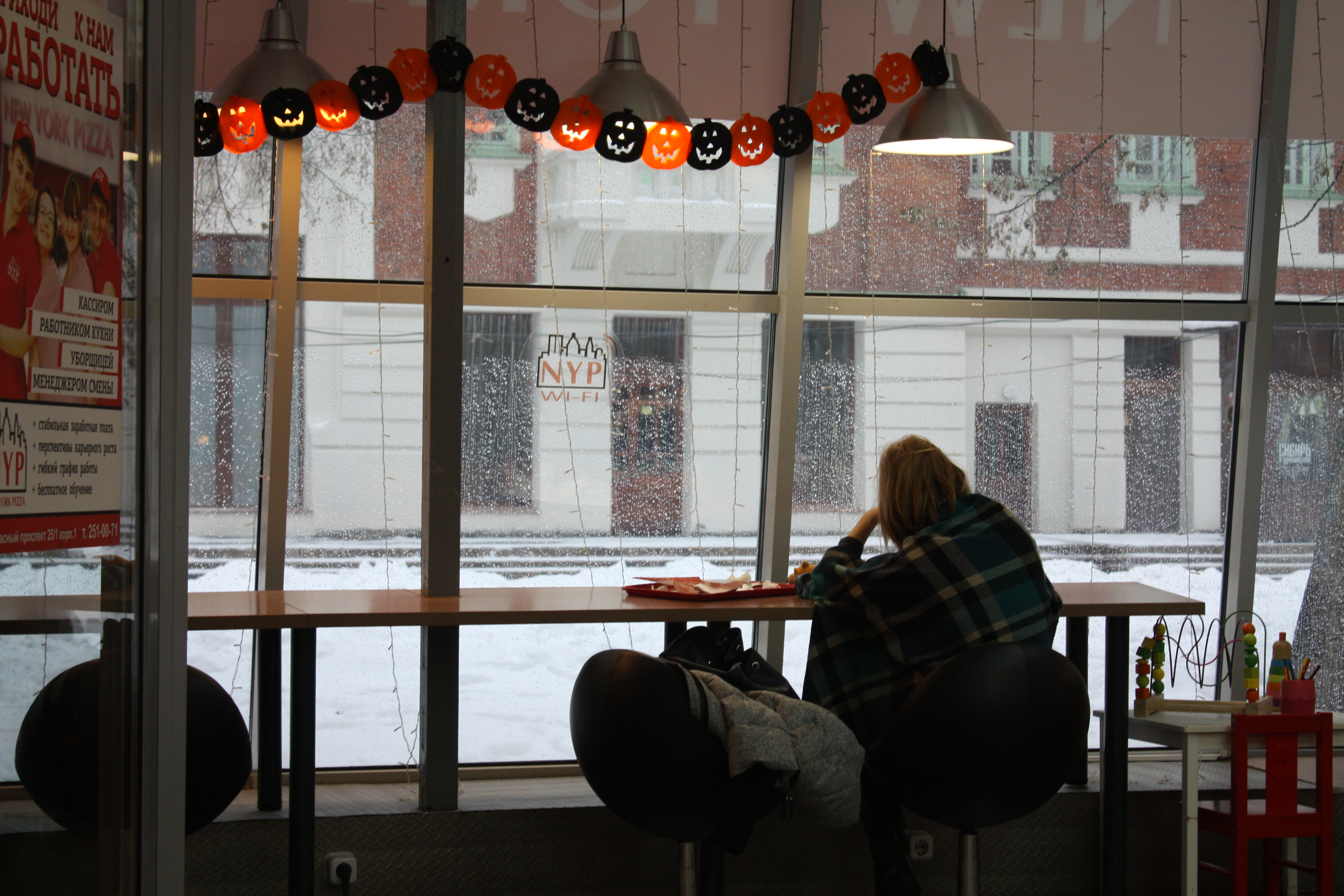

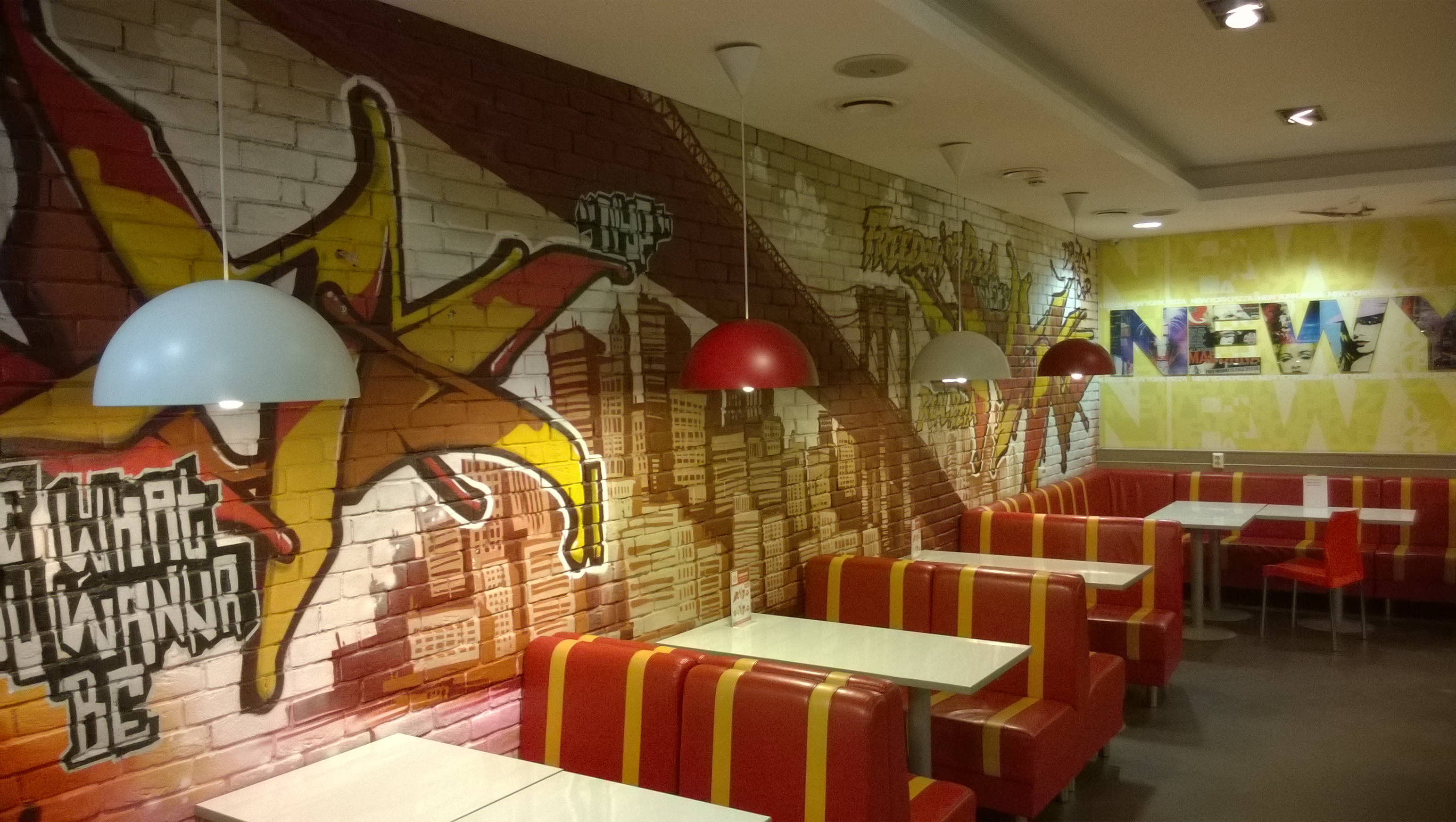

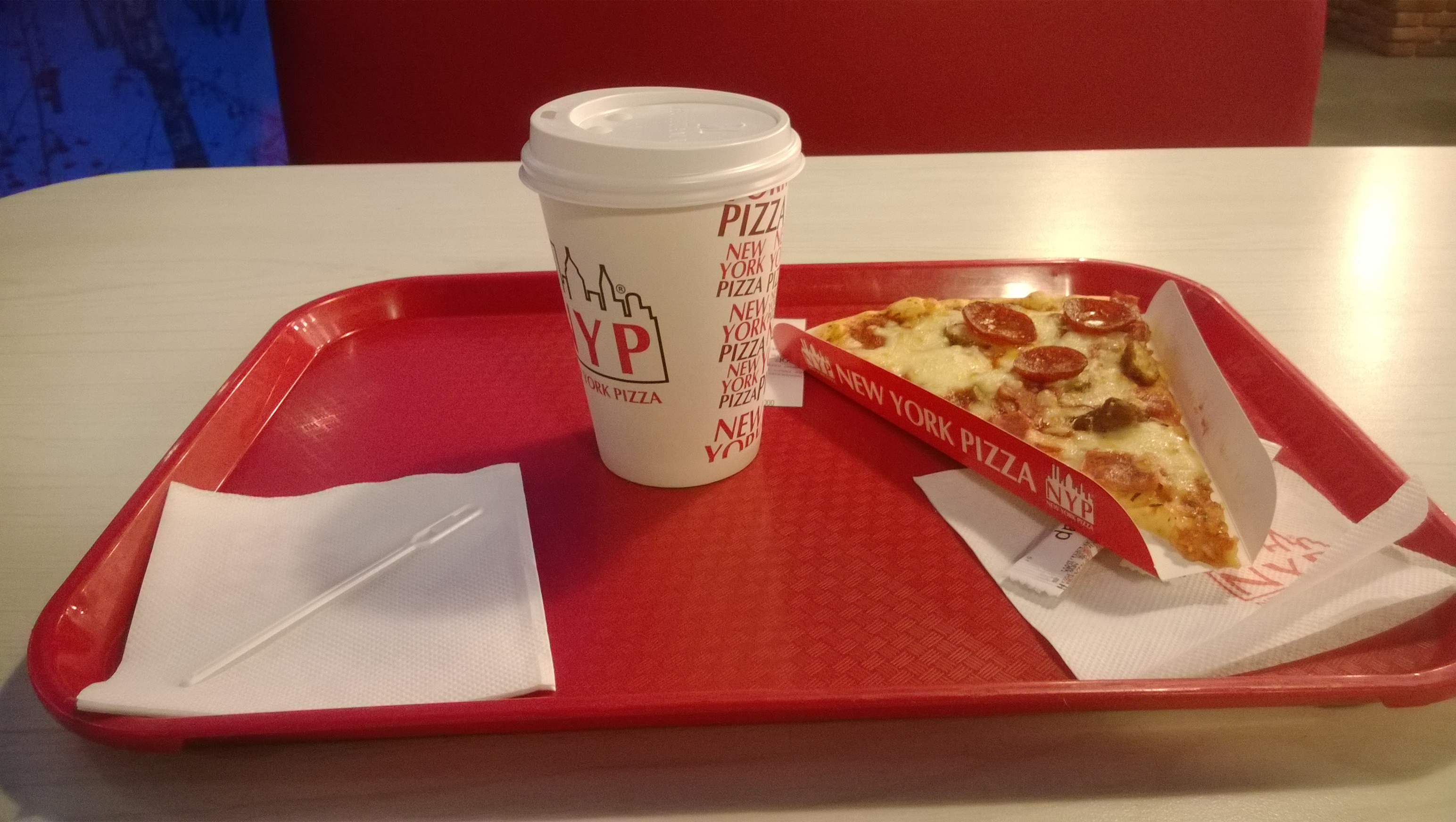

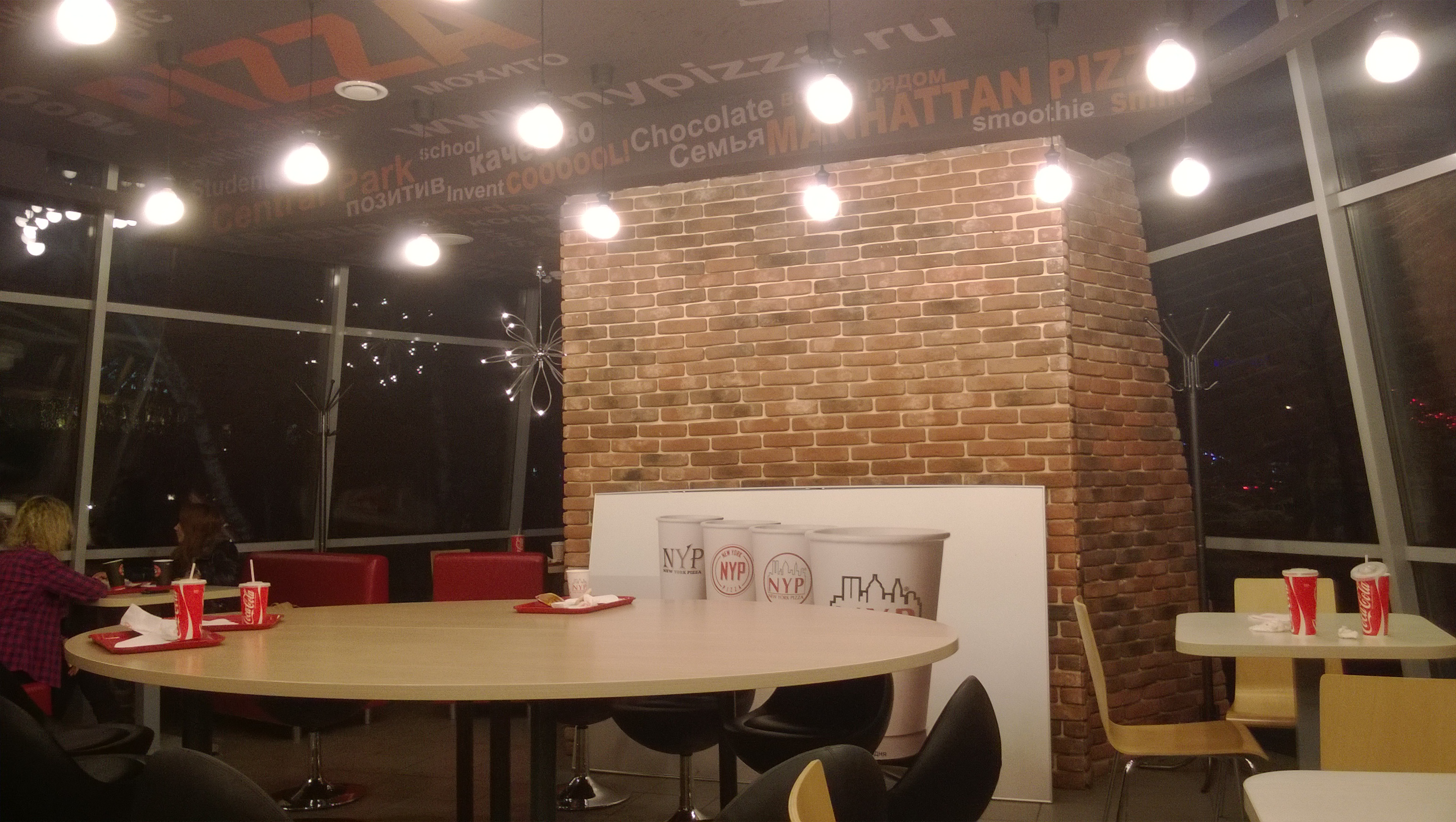

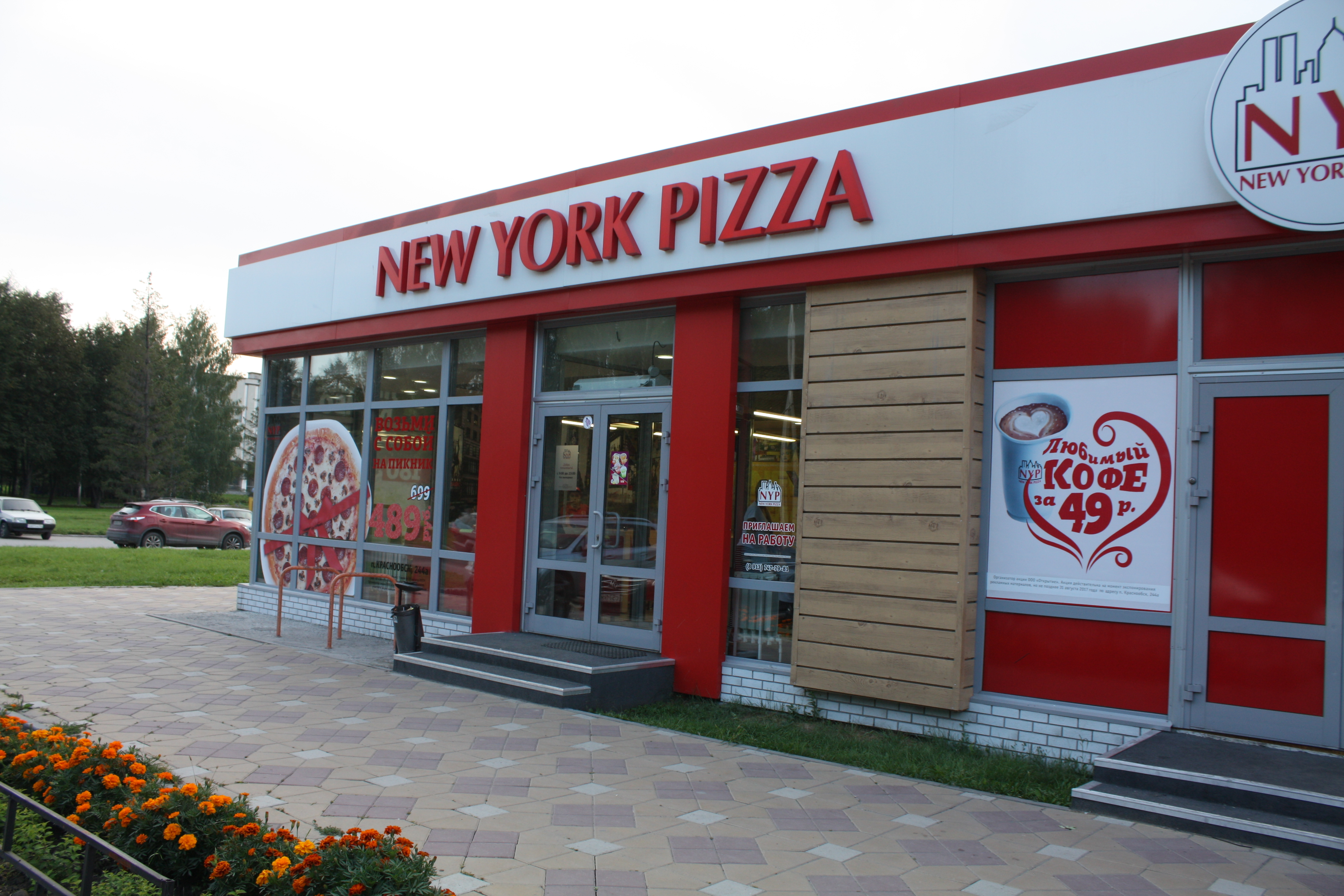

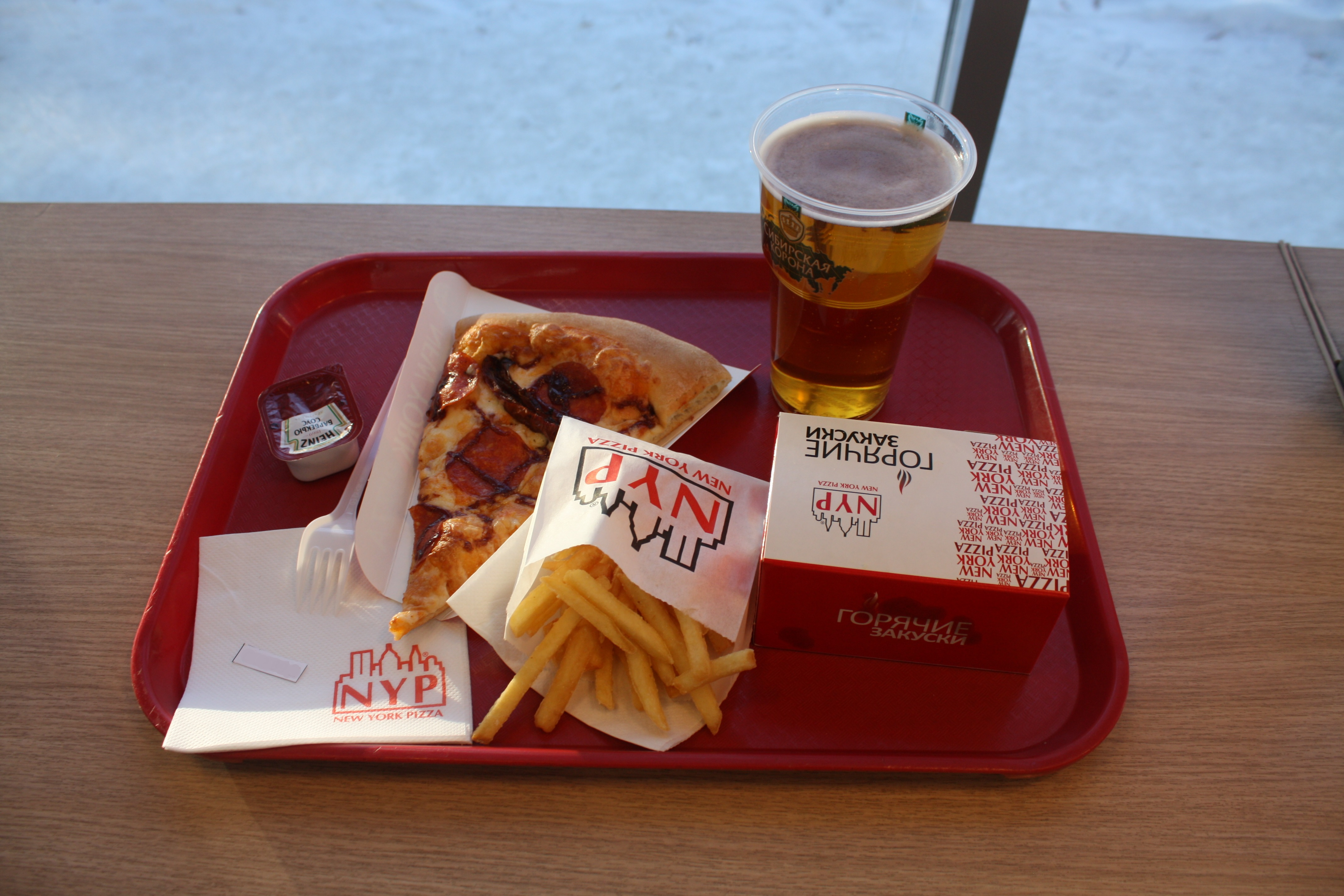

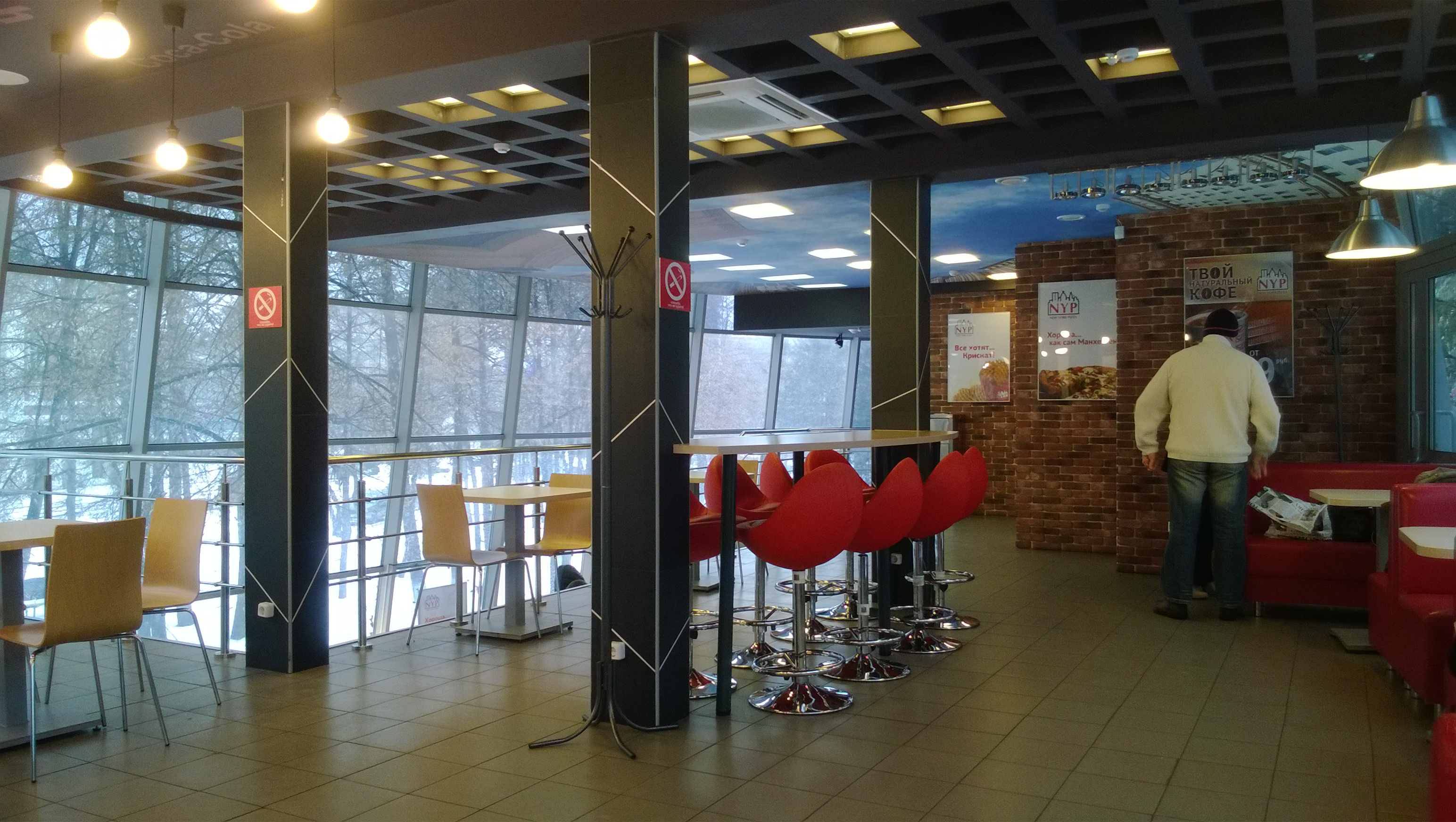

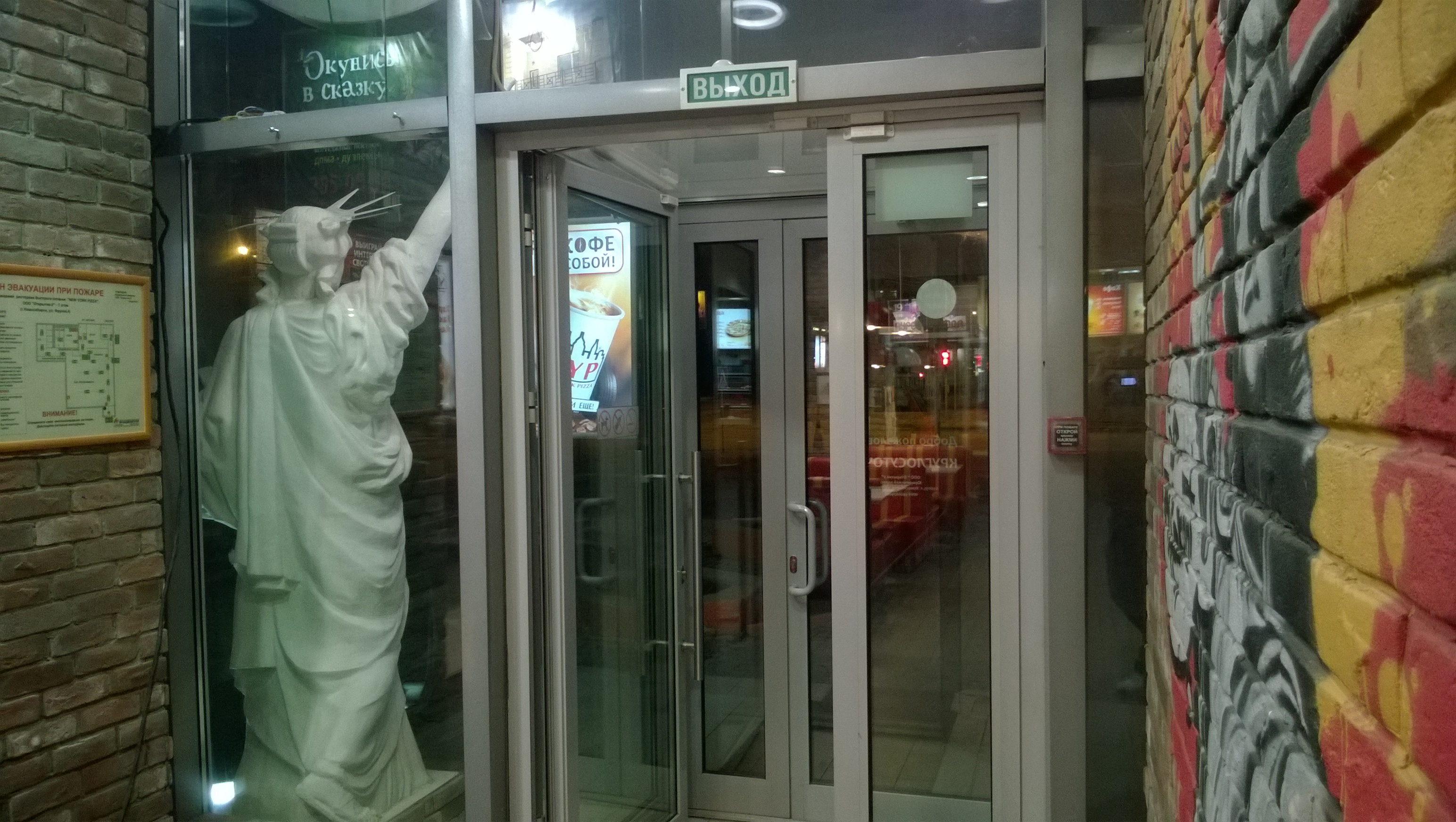

== See also ==
- Kuzina
