= Westgate station (Metro Transit) =

Light rail station in Saint Paul, Minnesota

Westgate
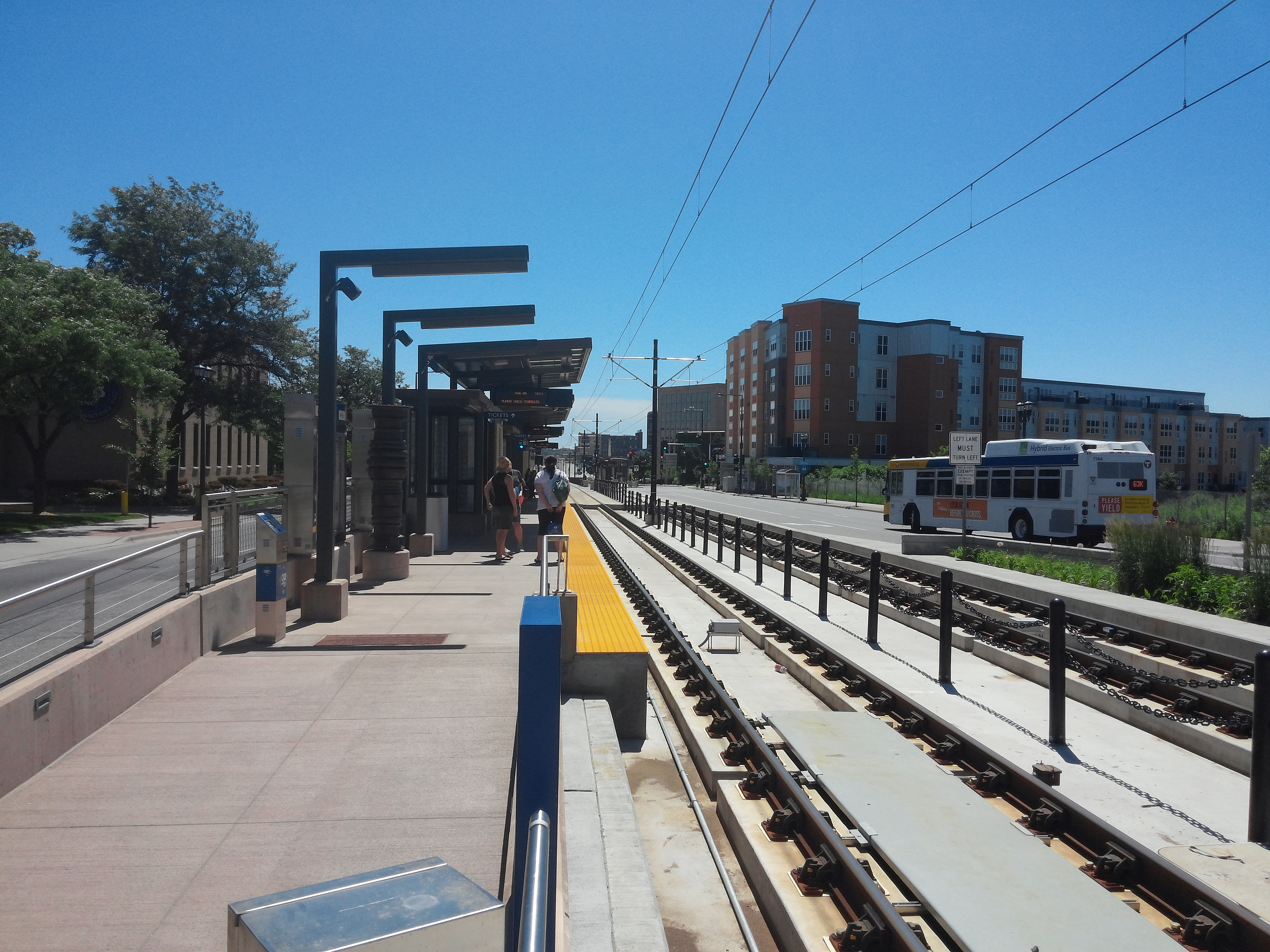
- Westgate Park station platform in June 2014, looking east towards downtown Saint Paul

General information
- Location: 2646 University Avenue West (Eastbound); 2671 University Avenue West (Westbound); Saint Paul, Minnesota
- Coordinates: 44°58′01″N 93°12′18″W
- Owner: Metro Transit
- Platforms: 2 split side platforms
- Tracks: 2
- Connections: Metro Transit: 30, 33, 63

Construction
- Structure type: At-grade
- Cycle facilities: Nice Ride station
- Accessible: Yes

Other information
- Station code: WGAT

History
- Opened: June 14, 2014

Passengers
- 2025: 656 daily ▼17.1% (Green Line)
- Rank: 26 out of 37

Services
Preceding station	Metro	Following station
Prospect Park toward Target Field	Green Line	Raymond Avenue toward Saint Paul Union Depot
University & Malcolm toward Southdale	E Line	Terminus
Location

Westgate station is a light rail station along the Metro Green Line in Saint Paul, Minnesota. It is located in the median of University Avenue with split side platforms either side of Berry Street.

== Description ==
The westbound platform in on the north side of the tracks west of Berry Street, while the eastbound platform is on the south side of the tracks on the east side of the intersection. It is the last station in Saint Paul before entering Minneapolis.

== History ==
Construction in this area began in March 2011. The station opened along with the rest of the line in 2014. Unlike other stations along University Avenue in Saint Paul, it is named after the area rather than the cross street. The name "Westgate" comes from the area being the western gateway into Saint Paul. Before the construction of I-94 and Highway 280 it was known as the "West End Manufacturing District." The Westgate Business Center is located immediately north of the station.

On August 31, 2014, around 10:15 AM Shana G. Buchanan, 42, was hit and killed at the Westgate station by the Metro Green Line train as she crossed the tracks in front of the train.

== Connecting services ==
North of the station on Berry Street is an informal transit center, where Routes 30, 33, and 63 begin and end their trips. The Metro E Line is planned to terminate at the station.
