= Dickerman Park =

Park in Saint Paul, Minnesota, United States

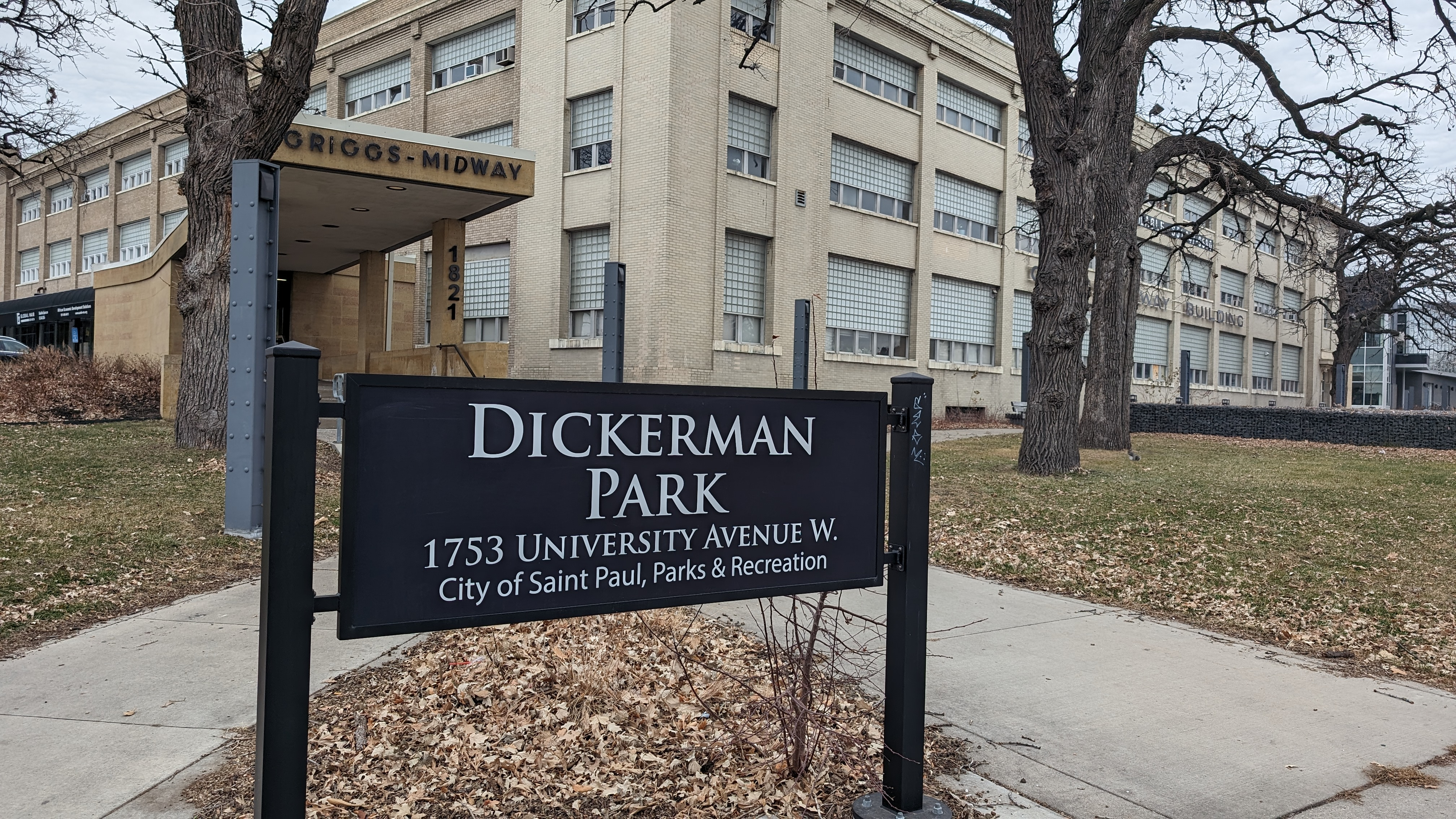
- Sign for Dickerman Park in front of the Griggs-Midway Building.
- Interactive map of Dickerman Park
- Location: Saint Paul, Minnesota
- Coordinates: 44°57′22″N 93°10′26″W
- Area: 2.5 acres (10,000 m^{2})
- Created: 1909
- Operator: City of Saint Paul
- Website: http://www.dickermanpark.org/

Dickerman Park is an urban park in Saint Paul, Minnesota, United States. The park is located along University Avenue. The park is 2.5-acre (10,000 m^{2}) in size and stretches along the north side of University from Fairview to Aldine street. The land was donated to the city in 1909 but was never developed as a public green space. Since the park's founding sections have been paved over for parking lots and other sections are used as front yards for businesses. Proposals for redevelopment gained traction in the 2000s with support from the original family that donated the land. The park is often mistaken as a broad setback from buildings on University Avenue.

== History ==
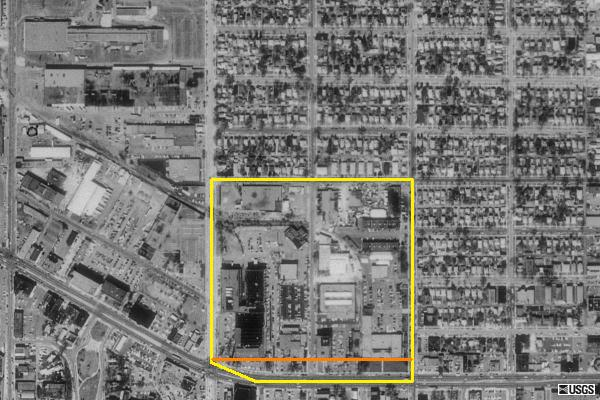
The original land plot, outlined in yellow, compared to its current size, outlined in orange.

There are two variations on how the park was created. According to Donald L. Empson in his book The Street Where You Live an area from University north to Thomas Avenue and Fairview Avenue east to Aldine Street was platted in 1906 as Dickerman Park. The subdivision, owned by the Dickerman family, was reconfigured six years later by Dickerman Investment Company and Griggs, Cooper & Co. to move the lots from abutting University Avenue back 160 feet (49 m) establishing a greenspace along the two blocks. In 1929 an atlas noted that the land was "dedicated for a parkway".

According to most other sources the land was donated by Dickerman Investment Co. in 1909 for "park and parkway" purposes. The donation was intended to spur development around the Dickerman Park Addition, a platted development owned by the company. The company's president was G.G. Dickerman, and secretary was C.K. Dickerman. At the time city planners envisioned University Avenue to become a sweeping boulevard similar to Champs-Élysées.

In 1957 the westernmost portion was paved over for use by the Griggs-Midway Building with consent by the City of Saint Paul. In 1977 the Midway YMCA built a ten car parking lot again with permission from the city. Since then the Midway YMCA and several charter schools on the east side of the park have constructed playgrounds on the park apparently without official approval from the city.

== Redevelopment ==
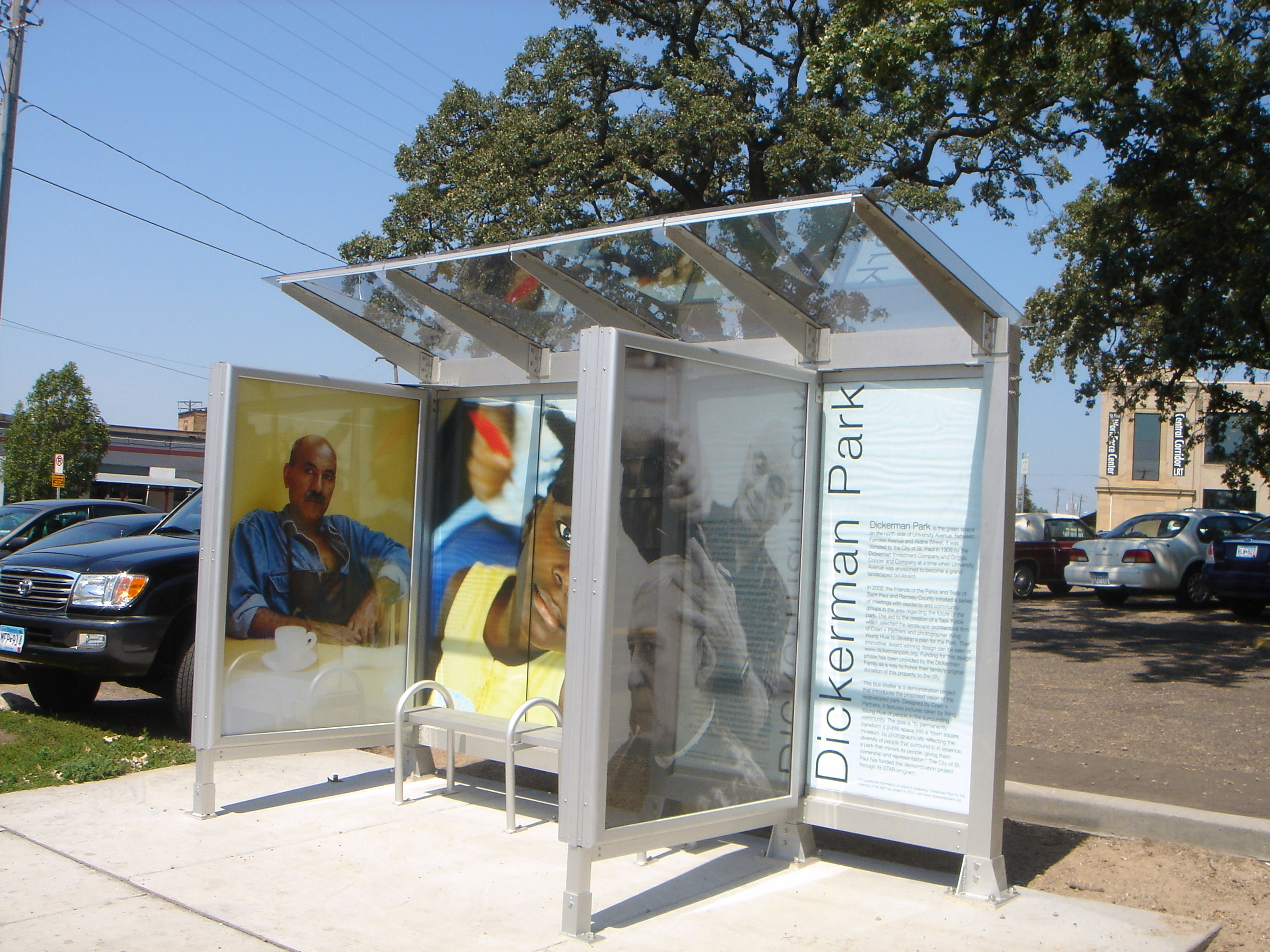
Bus shelter displaying information on Dickerman Park in 2009

Community groups have tried to revitalize the park several times. In 2003 a charette led by the "St. Paul on the Mississippi Design Center" and sponsored by Dickerman Park Task force, which grew out of the St. Paul Friends of the Parks and Trails, was created. The charette split into three groups which produced four designs for the project. The use of the space as a playground gained little support with only one group including play areas for the around 600 students who attend one of the several charter schools or are involved in the YMCA. Most plans focused on unifying the fragmented park with either turf or native planting underneath the 100-year-old oak trees. One of the challenges of having play areas for children is the necessary division from busy University Avenue.

In 2005 Kent Dickerman, the last Dickerman descendant still living in Saint Paul, found out about the park donated by his grandfather and great-uncle. He contacted his relatives and helped raise $45,000 for analysis and preliminary design to revitalize the park. Jay Benanav, the then local city council member admitted that he had not heard of the park when he was elected. The landscape architecture firm Coen and Partners and photographer Wing Yung Huie were hired in 2005 to design the park.

Several design proposals have been proposed. Part of the impetus for the redevelopment of the park is the planned METRO Green Line light rail that would run down University Avenue. The Fairview Avenue Station would be just across the street from the park.
