= Fairview Avenue station (Metro Transit) =

Light rail station in Saint Paul, Minnesota

Fairview Avenue
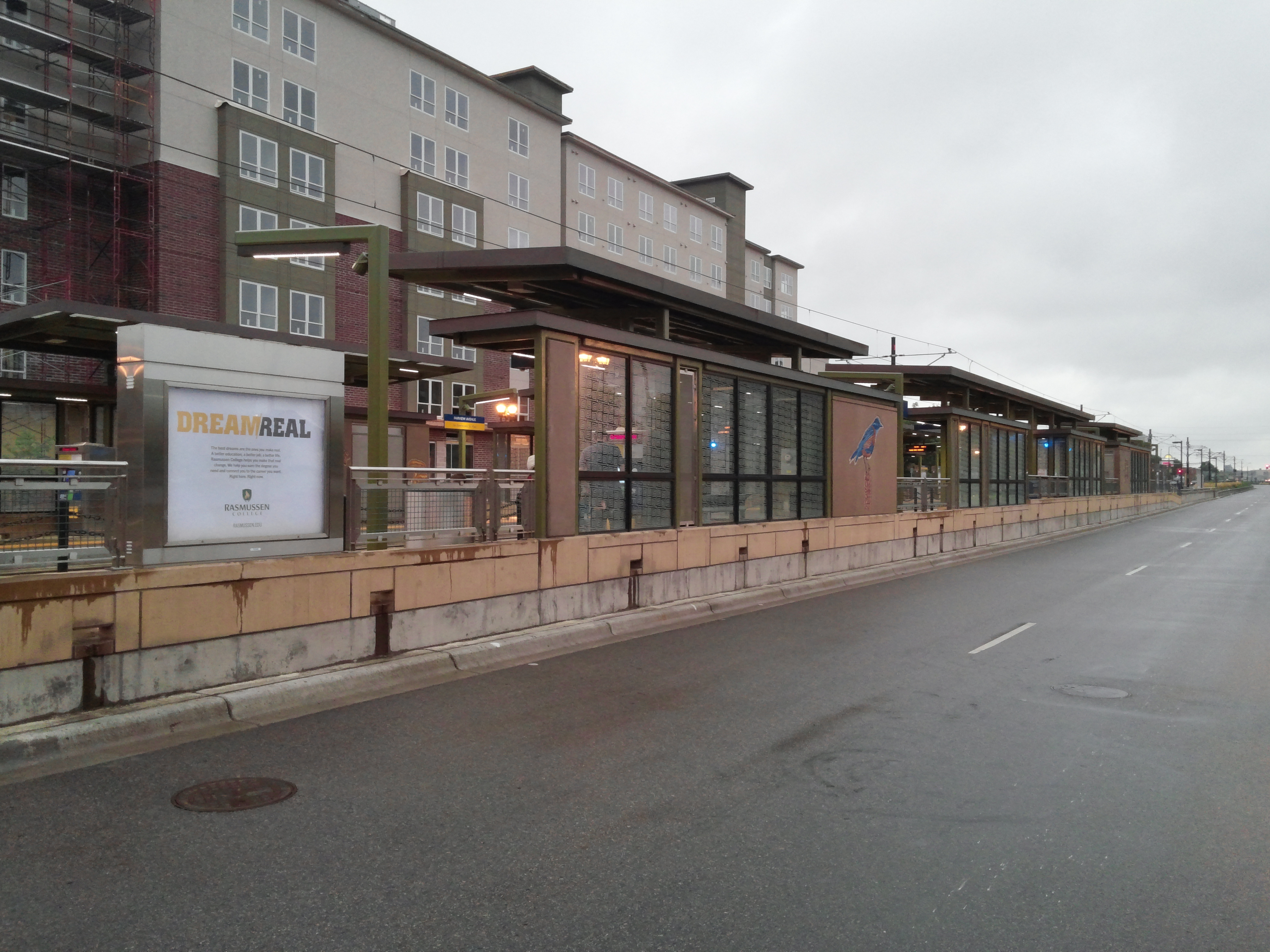
- Fairview Avenue station platform in 2014

General information
- Location: 1863 University Avenue West; Saint Paul, Minnesota
- Coordinates: 44°57′23″N 93°10′44″W
- Owner: Metro Transit
- Platforms: 2 side platforms
- Tracks: 2
- Connections: Metro Transit: 67

Construction
- Structure type: At-grade
- Cycle facilities: Nice Ride station
- Accessible: Yes

History
- Opened: June 14, 2014

Passengers
- 2025: 709 daily ▼14.8%
- Rank: 25 out of 37

Services
Preceding station	Metro	Following station
Raymond Avenue toward Target Field	Green Line	Snelling Avenue toward Saint Paul Union Depot
Location

Fairview Avenue station is a light rail station along the Metro Green Line in Saint Paul, Minnesota. It is located along University Avenue between Lynnhurst Avenue and Fairview Avenue. A preliminary architectural design revealed in May 2009 featured oak trees and was inspired by the trees in the neighborhood's parks.

Construction in this area began in March 2011. The station opened along with the rest of the line in 2014.

== Notable places nearby ==
- Dickerman Park
- Griggs Midway Building
