= 50th & France =

Coordinates: 44°54′45″N 93°19′44.5″W

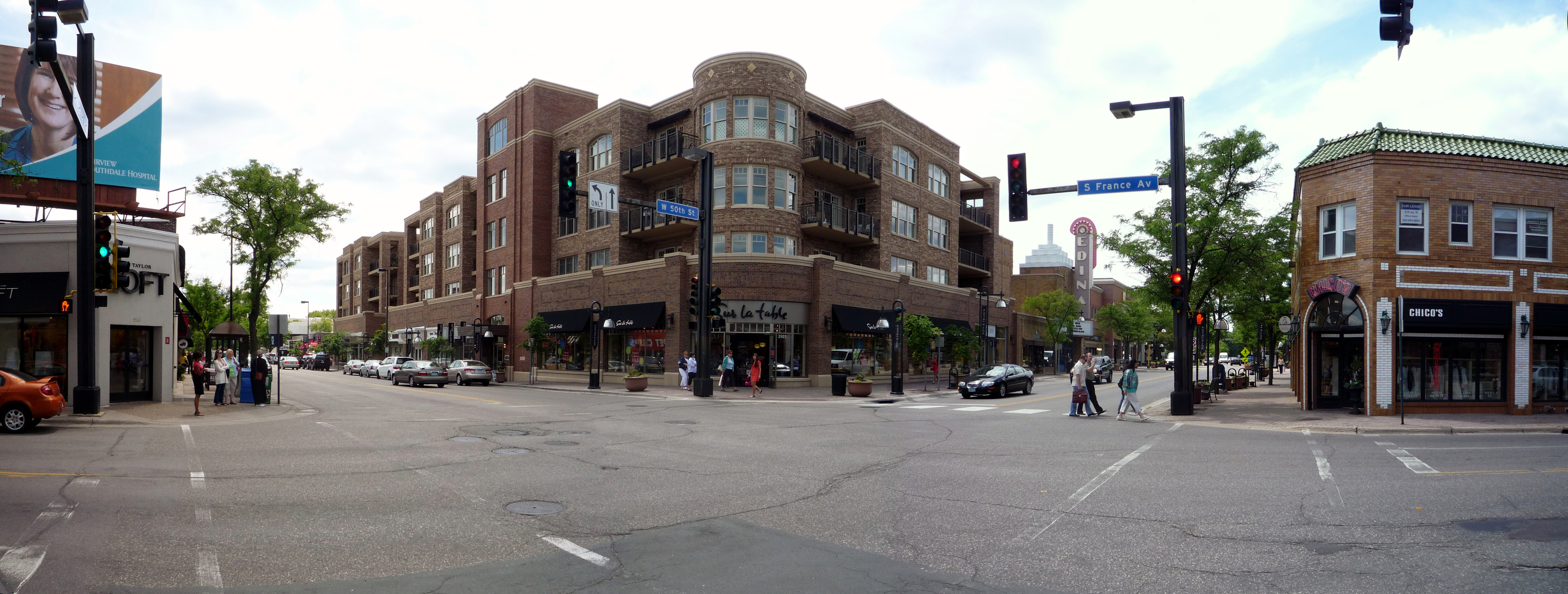
South (left) and west on 50th Street with the Edina Theater shown in the background.

50th & France is a commercial district located in the area of West 50th Street and France Avenue South in the cities of Edina and Minneapolis in the U.S. state of Minnesota. It includes over 175 retail shops and offices. Shops include various apparel stores, craft stores, jewelers, restaurants, cafes, spas, salons, and multiplex art-house movie theater. The district is known for more upscale businesses and services. In 2007, a mid-rise condominium building, with units going for well over $1 million, was built on the southwest corner of the intersection.

Construction on a $79 million mixed-use development that included luxury apartments in 2018-2019 may have resulted in the loss of some businesses but new businesses opened to replace many of the closed retail establishment. The potential redevelopment of a city of Edina parking lot in 2019 raised concerns from business owners concerned about the loss of parking reducing visitors to the area.

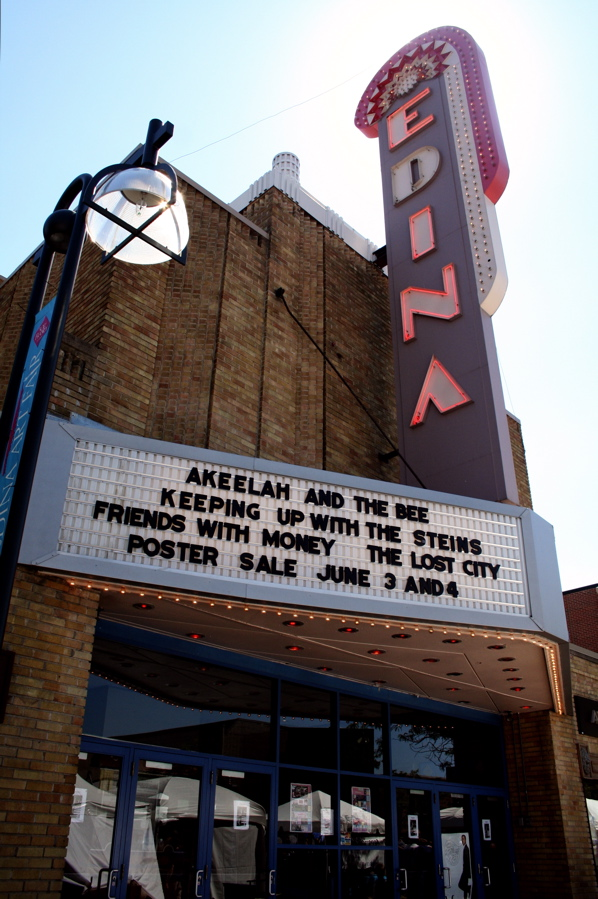
Edina Theater located in the district.

After the COVID-19 pandemic, many retail districts in the Twin Cities struggled, but 50th and France emerged from the pandemic relatively healthy. The wealthier demographics of Edina and southwest Minneapolis were noted as potential reasons for the success of the district. Demand for smaller retailer spaces was particularly strong after the pandemic. The Edina Cinema closed partially due to the pandemic but after some funding from the city of Edina, the theater reopened as part of Mann Theatres.

Once a year the 50th & France area hosts the Edina Art Fair, which has served as a national showcase for the fine arts since 1966.

The bus route Metro E Line will have a station at 50th and France. The local business association had requested the station be moved to 51st and France but the station was not moved.
