= France Avenue =

Street in Minneapolis, United States

Coordinates: 44°53′43″N 93°19′44.5″W

- Interactive map of France Avenue
- Length: 9.891 mi (15.918 km)
- North end: Excelsior Boulevard in Minneapolis
- Major junctions: West 50th Street in Minneapolis; MN 62 in Edina; I-494 / MN 5 in Edina, Bloomington; Old Shakopee Road in Bloomington
- South end: Overlook Drive in Bloomington

France Avenue is a major street in Minneapolis, Edina, and Bloomington, with shorter segments in several other suburbs (Brooklyn Park, Brooklyn Center, Robbinsdale, and Golden Valley) in the Minneapolis–Saint Paul metro area.

== Route description ==
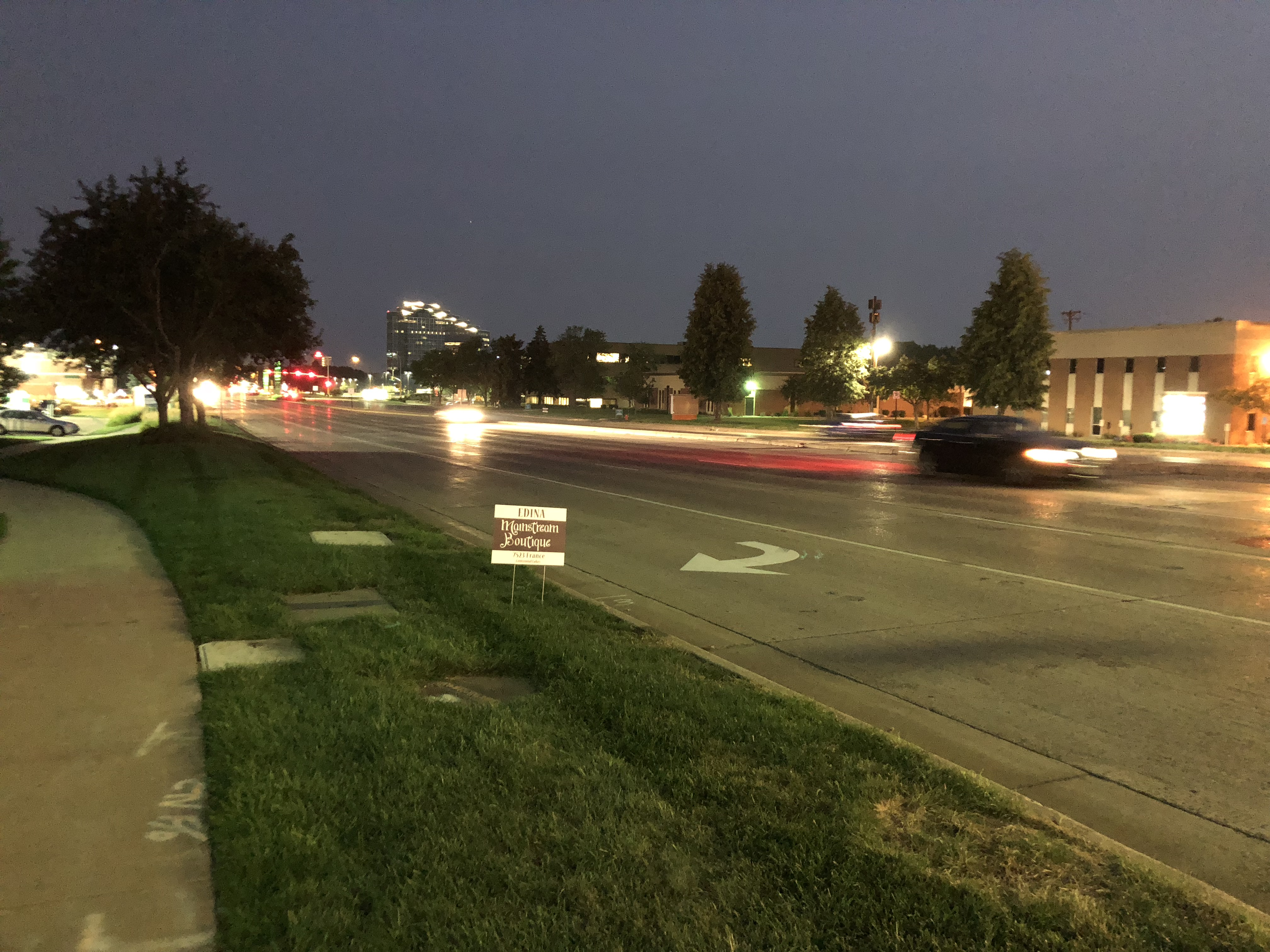
France Avenue at night in Edina

The longest portion of France Avenue begins at the Minnesota River in Bloomington. County Road 17 begins at Old Shakopee Road. It crosses MN-62, and ends at the junction with Excelsior Boulevard at the border of Minneapolis and St. Louis Park. This portion of France Avenue includes the Southdale commercial district in Edina, and the 50th and France commercial district at the border of Minneapolis and Edina.

Between Excelsior Boulevard and W 54th Street, France Avenue designates the western border of Minneapolis.

== Major intersections ==
The entire route is in Hennepin County.

Location	mi	km	Destinations	Notes
Bloomington	0.000	0.000	Overlook Drive	
Bloomington	0.9	1.4	CR 1 (Old Shakopee Road)	
Bloomington			West 98th Street	
Bloomington			West 90th Street	
Bloomington	4.45	7.16	I-494 / MN 5	
Edina			CR 53 (West 66th Street)	
Edina	5.31	8.55	MN 62	
Minneapolis			CR 21 (West 50th Street)	
Minneapolis			West 44th Street	
Minneapolis	9.891	15.918	CR 3 (Excelsior Boulevard)	
1.000 mi = 1.609 km; 1.000 km = 0.621 mi: Concurrency terminus; Incomplete access
