= St. Cloud station =

Train station in St. Cloud, Minnesota, United States

St. Cloud, MN
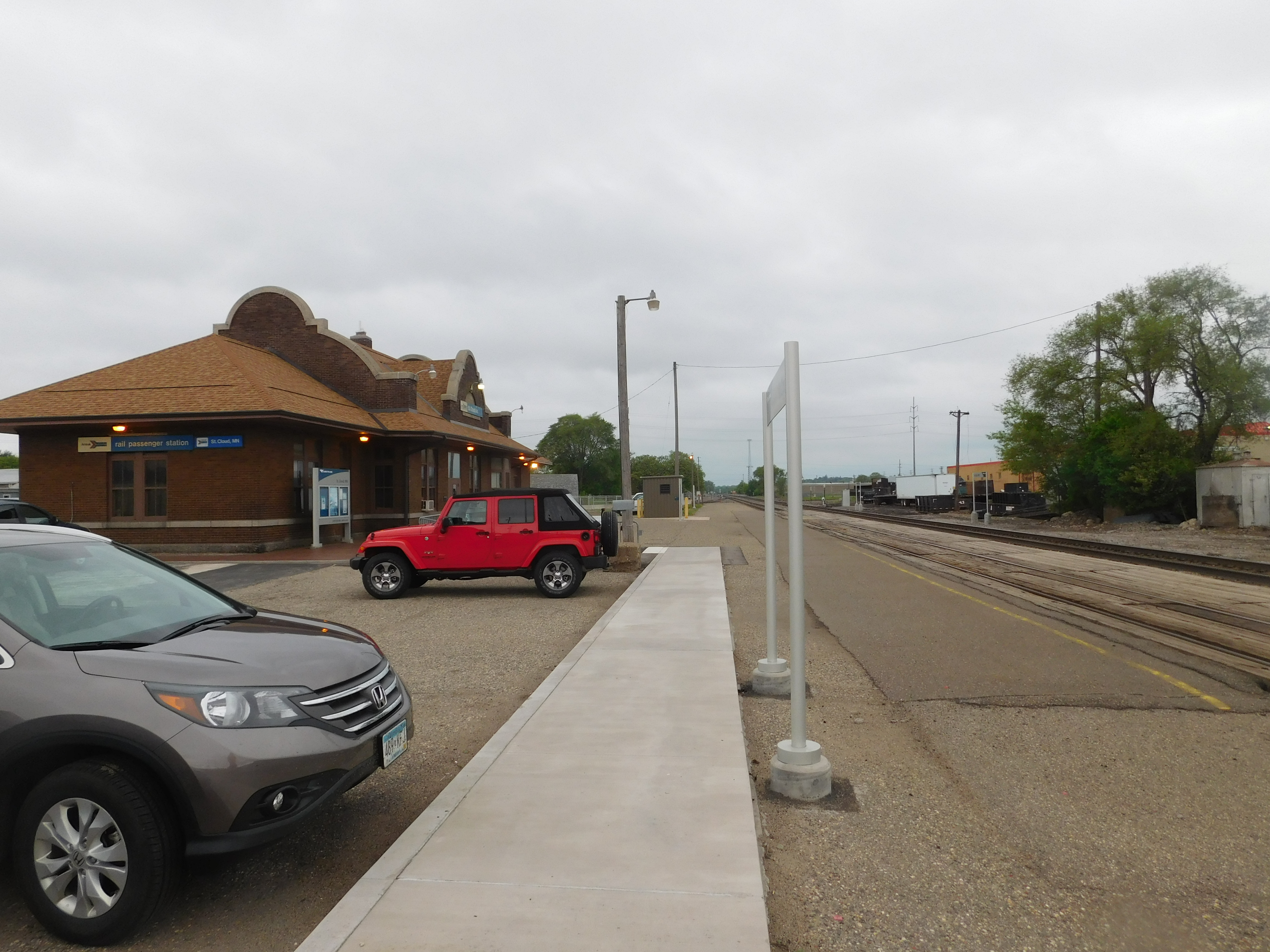
- St. Cloud station, May 2017

General information
- Location: 555 East Saint Germain Street; St. Cloud, Minnesota; United States
- Coordinates: 45°34′04″N 94°08′56″W
- Owner: BNSF Railway
- Line: BNSF Staples Subdivision
- Platforms: 1 side platform 1 island platform
- Tracks: 2
- Connections: St. Cloud Metro Bus

Construction
- Parking: 40 free long term spaces
- Cycle facilities: Yes
- Accessible: Yes

Other information
- Station code: Amtrak: SCD

History
- Opened: 1909

Passengers
- FY 2025: 8,247 (Amtrak)

Services
| Preceding station | Amtrak | Following station |
|---|---|---|
| Staples toward Seattle or Portland | Empire Builder | St. Paul toward Chicago |
Former services
| Preceding station | Amtrak | Following station |
|---|---|---|
| Staples toward Seattle or Portland | Empire Builder | Saint Paul–Midway Closed 2014 toward Chicago |
| Staples toward Seattle | North Coast Hiawatha 1971-1979 | Minneapolis toward Chicago |
| Preceding station | Northern Pacific Railway | Following station |
| Sauk Rapids toward Seattle or Tacoma | Main Line | Clear Lake toward St. Paul |
| Little Falls toward Winnipeg | Winnipeg – St. Paul | Elk River toward St. Paul |
Location

St. Cloud station is an Amtrak intercity train station in St. Cloud, Minnesota, United States. It is served by the daily Empire Builder on its route connecting Chicago, Illinois to Seattle, Washington and Portland, Oregon. (Note: As of May 7, 2014, the Empire Builder westbound trains (Trains 7 & 27) are scheduled to stop at 12:40 am and the eastbound trains (Trains 8 & 28) are scheduled to stop at 4:44 am.) The next stop westbound is Staples while the next stop eastbound is Saint Paul Union Depot. (Note: For over twenty-five years prior to May 7, 2014, the next eastbound stop was at the Midway station, located west of the Saint Paul Union Depot. The Empire Builder was to continue to stop at the Midway station for servicing, but passengers will not be allowed to board or disembark. Amtrak is being encouraged to restore service to the Midway Station in addition to the new service to the Saint Paul Depot.)

== Description ==
The station is located at 555 East Saint Germain Street on the east side of the Mississippi River in the middle of a wye that links to the St. Cloud Rail Bridge. The depot is easily accessible from US 10 by taking the SH 23 interchange (toward St. Cloud) and heading southwest on 3rd Street Southeast (SH 23), then north-northwest on Lincoln Avenue Southeast, then southeast on East Saint Germain Street, and finally north-northwest again on the station access road (immediately after crossing the tracks). There is an enclosed waiting room (with restrooms) available daily from 4:00 am to 6:00 am and from 11:30 pm to 1:15 am (early the next morning), with a caretaker opening and closing the depot. It has neither ticketing office, ticket counter, nor a Quik-Trak kiosk. No other services are provided at the station (i.e., baggage, lounge, pay phone, etc.). The tracks, platform, depot building, and parking lot are all owned by the BNSF Railway.

== History ==
It was built in 1909 by the Northern Pacific Railway. The depot is constructed of brown pressed brick with grey granite trim.

The St. Cloud station was served by the North Coast Hiawatha, with service from Chicago to Seattle from 1971 until the train was discontinued in 1979. The next westbound stop for the North Coast Hiawatha was in Staples and the next eastbound stop was in Minneapolis, Minnesota. When the North Coast Hiawatha was discontinued in 1979, the Empire Builder was rerouted away from Willmar, Minnesota to St. Cloud and has served the station continuously since then. The next westbound stop for the Empire Builder is also in Staples and the next eastbound stop is in Saint Paul. However, in 2014, Amtrak service in Saint Paul was moved from the Midway Station to the Saint Paul Union Depot.

The station is one of three in Minnesota and 78 across the Amtrak network listed in a 2021 settlement with the U.S. Department of Justice over inaccessible facilities under the Americans with Disabilities Act. New station platforms, walkways, lighting, and other accessibility improvements will be constructed between Amtrak's fiscal year 2024 and 2026.

The Northstar commuter rail service was originally planned to originate in Rice, Minnesota and serve the St. Cloud station, but was cut back to Big Lake. On November 8, 2010, it was announced that extension of the line to St. Cloud had been indefinitely delayed, as projected ridership was not sufficient to qualify for federal funding. The extension was never implemented as the Northstar Line ended service on January 4, 2026.

== Future service ==
The station was considered as a possible endpoint for the Borealis service that started running in 2024, but it began operation with its western terminus in St. Paul. In 2023, $4 million was included in the Minnesota state budget to study a daytime train service between the Twin Cities and Fargo, North Dakota, a service that would include stops at St. Cloud station.
