= Anoka station =

Former commuter rail station in Anoka, Minnesota

Anoka
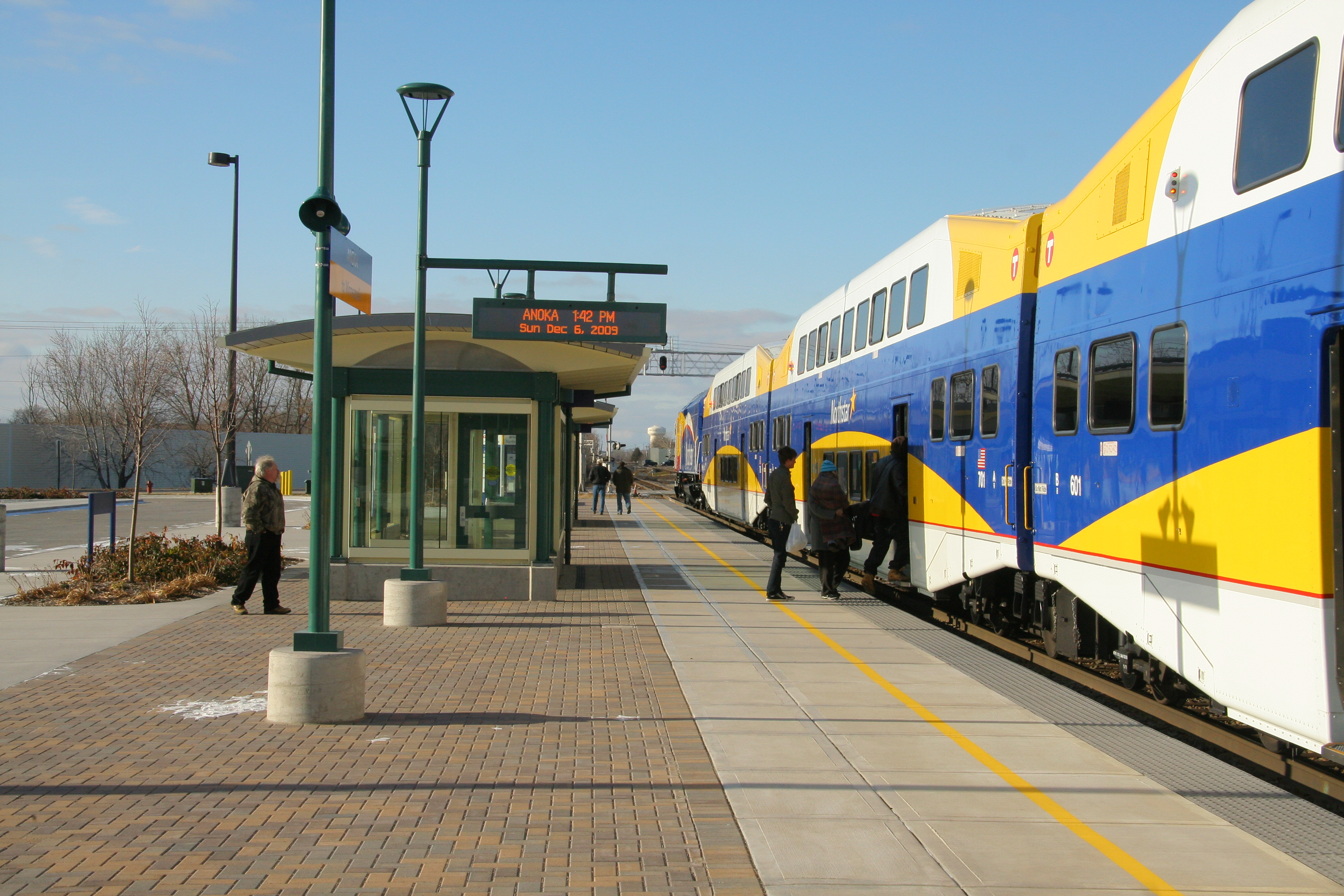
- Northstar train at the southbound platform of Anoka station.

General information
- Location: 2718 4th Avenue; Anoka, Minnesota
- Coordinates: 45°12′28″N 93°23′05″W
- Line: BNSF Staples Subdivision
- Platforms: 2 side platforms
- Tracks: 2
- Connections: Metro Transit: 805

Construction
- Parking: 377 spaces
- Cycle facilities: 12 lockers
- Accessible: Yes

History
- Opened: November 16, 2009
- Closed: January 4, 2026
Former services
Preceding station	Metro Transit	Following station
Ramsey toward Big Lake	Northstar Line	Coon Rapids–Riverdale toward Target Field
Preceding station	Great Northern Railway	Following station
Dayton toward Milaca	Milaca – Minneapolis	Coon Creek Junction toward Minneapolis
Track layout
Location

Anoka station was a commuter rail station in Anoka, Minnesota, located at 2718 4th Avenue. It was served by the Northstar Line. The station featured bicycle lockers and two park and ride lots. The north lot had 181 spaces and the south lot has 196 spaces, with a total capacity of 377 vehicles. The commute time to downtown Minneapolis from this station was about 32 minutes. In 2012, the weekday fare to downtown Minneapolis from this station was $3.00. The fare to and from any other station also was $3.00 on weekdays. In 2022, the weekday fares still were $3.00 to downtown Minneapolis and $3.00 to any other station.

== History ==
The doubled tracked main line for the BNSF Railway transcontinental railroad travels through Anoka after leaving Minneapolis. It runs parallel to the Mississippi River. The former Northern Pacific Railway and Great Northern Railway parallel main lines form this double track main. Anoka had been served by a station at what is now North Street and North 8th Avenue, the Great Northern Anoka Depot. This depot was designed by noted architect Cass Gilbert, and was roughly 4 blocks east of the current platform. This structure was razed in 1993.

The Minneapolis, Anoka and Cuyuna Range Railway, whose tracks ran along East River Road, also served Anoka. Northern Pacific had four local trains each way serving Anoka in 1921. The last passenger trains that stopped at Anoka, the Northern Pacific 3 & 4 trains, were discontinued in 1967.

Amtrak has expressed interest and is in negotiations with BNSF for using Anoka as an infill station on the Empire Builder train.
