= Coon Rapids–Foley Boulevard station =

Planned train station in Coon Rapids, Minnesota

Coon Rapids–Foley Boulevard

General information
- Location: 9425 Foley Boulevard, Coon Rapids, MN 55433
- Coordinates: 45°8′29″N 93°17′10″W
- Owner: Metro Transit
- Line: BNSF Staples Subdivision
- Connections: Bus routes 850, 852

Construction
- Parking: 3,200 spaces

Services
Preceding station	Amtrak	Following station
Cambridge toward Duluth	Northern Lights Express	Minneapolis Target Field Terminus
Location

Coon Rapids–Foley Boulevard station is a planned train station in Coon Rapids, Minnesota, United States, at the site of a current Metro Transit park and ride facility. The station was originally included in plans for the Northstar Line, but was cut from that project to meet the Federal Transit Administration's cost-effectiveness index (CEI).

The current park-and-ride facility is located on a sliver of land in between Minnesota State Highway 610 and Foley Boulevard. It has 3,200 parking spaces with a surface lot and a two-story parking ramp, giving it more than four times the capacity of the largest existing Northstar station, Elk River (754 spaces). Despite the fact that it already existed and would be a significant source of riders, calculation of the cost-effectiveness index was biased toward saving time of commuters. Riders would not save enough time by changing from the existing bus service to rail, so the station was dropped.

Anoka County and the city of Coon Rapids have been acquiring land and making arrangements for matching funds for the station. It is expected to cost approximately $15 million to build the station. Construction would likely occur along with a related project to add a third set of rails along this stretch of track, which is the busiest in Minnesota. The third main line would allow additional passenger rail traffic. The station was planned to serve both the Northstar Line and the Northern Lights Express, since it is nicely located just south of Coon Creek Junction where the BNSF Hinckley Subdivision branches off of the Staples Subdivision main line.

In August 2025, it was announced that the Northstar Line would be discontinued in January 2026. However, the Northern Lights Express would still serve the station if it were built. The last trains on the Northstar Line ran on January 4, 2026, serving a Vikings–Packers game.
