= Coon Rapids–Riverdale station =

Former commuter rail station in Coon Rapids, Minnesota

Coon Rapids–Riverdale
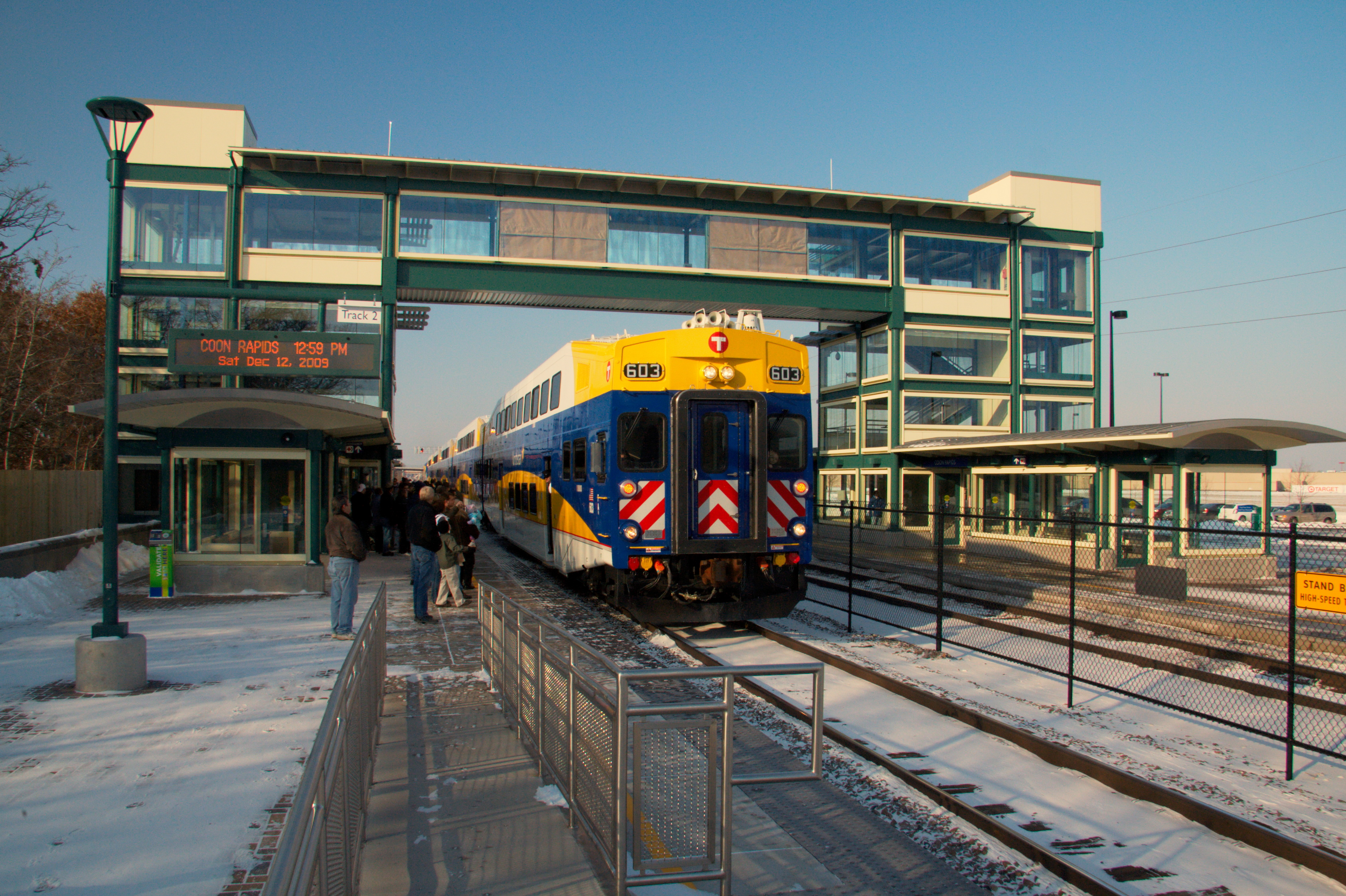
- Northstar train at Coon Rapids–Riverdale station

General information
- Location: 3050 Northdale Boulevard NW; Coon Rapids, Minnesota
- Coordinates: 45°11′28″N 93°21′05″W
- Line: BNSF Staples Subdivision
- Platforms: 2 side platforms
- Tracks: 2
- Connections: Metro Transit: 805, 850

Construction
- Parking: 466 spaces
- Accessible: Yes

History
- Opened: November 16, 2009
- Closed: January 4, 2026
Former services
Preceding station	Metro Transit	Following station
Anoka toward Big Lake	Northstar Line	Fridley toward Target Field
Preceding station	Great Northern Railway	Following station
Anoka toward Milaca	Milaca – Minneapolis	Fridley toward Minneapolis
Track layout
Location

Coon Rapids–Riverdale station was a commuter rail station in Coon Rapids, Minnesota, located at 3050 Northdale Boulevard NW, south of the Riverdale shopping centers. It is served by the Northstar Line. The station features bicycle lockers and a park and ride lot with capacity for 466 vehicles. The commute time to downtown Minneapolis from this station is about 28 minutes. The fare to downtown Minneapolis from this station is $3.25 at all times; the fare to and from any other station is $3.25 on weekdays and $2.75 on weekends and holidays.

As of the station's opening in 2009, signage simply called it "Coon Rapids" or "Coon Rapids Station". A second station in the city is planned at Foley Boulevard (just north of Minnesota State Highway 610), where there is currently a bus station with a large parking ramp for park and ride service. The Foley station would then be available as a stop on the Northern Lights Express to Duluth and the proposed Bethel Corridor line, since it is less than a mile south of the Coon Creek rail junction, where the tracks split and to go toward Bethel and Duluth.
