= Ramsey station (Metro Transit) =

Former commuter rail station in Ramsey, Minnesota

Ramsey
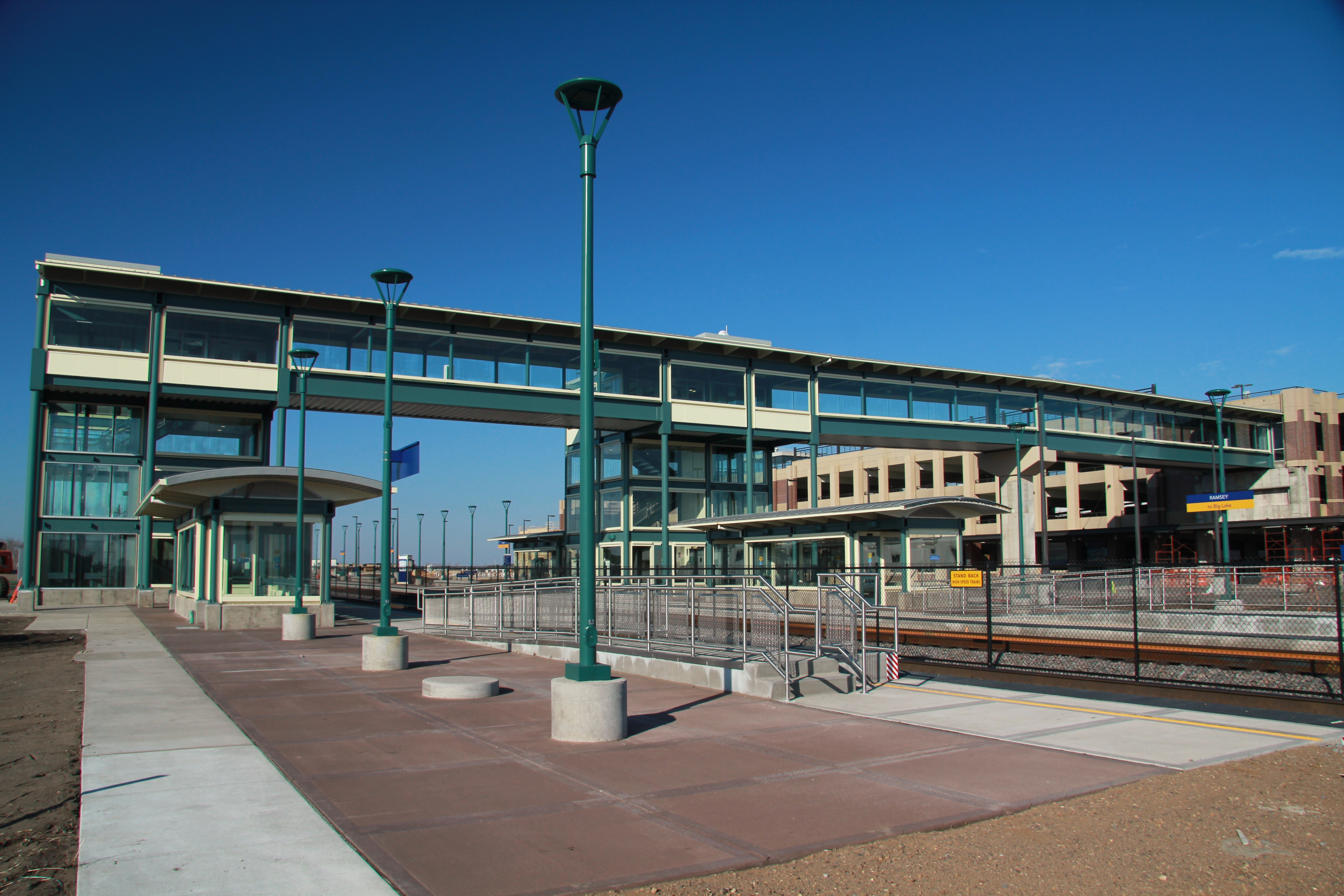
- Ramsey station platforms

General information
- Location: 7550 Sunwood Drive; Ramsey, Minnesota
- Coordinates: 45°13′55″N 93°27′42″W
- Line: BNSF Staples Subdivision
- Platforms: 2 side platforms
- Tracks: 2

Construction
- Parking: 800 spaces
- Accessible: Yes

History
- Opened: November 14, 2012
- Closed: January 4, 2026
Former services
Preceding station	Metro Transit	Following station
Elk River toward Big Lake	Northstar Line	Anoka toward Target Field
Preceding station	Great Northern Railway	Following station
Elk River toward Milaca	Milaca – Minneapolis	Anoka toward Minneapolis
Track layout
Location

Ramsey station was a commuter rail station along the Northstar Line in Ramsey, Minnesota, approximately 35 minutes from downtown Minneapolis. It is the first infill station on the route, fitting between stations in Elk River and Anoka. Those stations opened when Northstar began service on November 16, 2009, while Ramsey opened just over three years later on November 14, 2012. The station is located next to Ramsey's city hall at The COR (formerly known as Ramsey Town Center), a transit-oriented development next to the line. Construction on the station began on March 27, 2012, and was completed on November 8; the station was opened on November 14. The commuter rail service replaced the Ramsey Star Express commuter bus (route 856) that connected the city to Minneapolis. The station closed when Northstar ended service on January 4, 2026.
