= Northstar Line =

Commuter rail route in Minnesota, United States

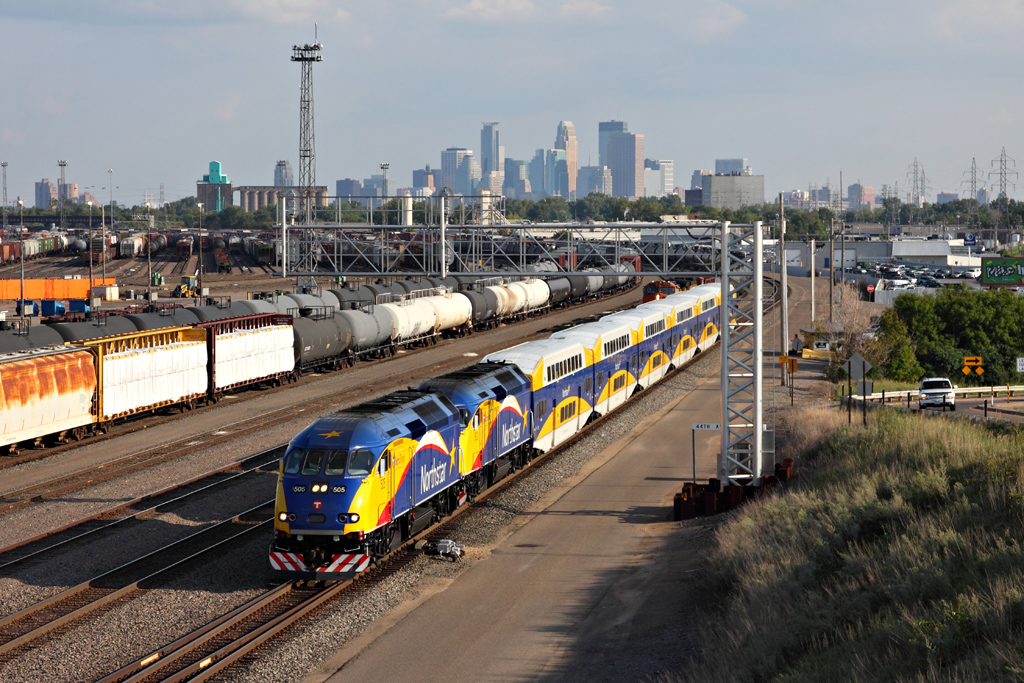

Overview
- Owner: Metropolitan Council
- Locale: Minnesota (Minneapolis, Hennepin County, Anoka County and Sherburne County)
- Termini: Target Field; Big Lake
- Stations: 7
- Website: metrotransit.org/northstar

Service
- Type: Commuter rail
- System: Metro Transit
- Train number: 888
- Operator: BNSF Railway
- Rolling stock: MotivePower MP36PH-3C, Bombardier BiLevel Coach
- Daily ridership: (weekdays, Q2 2026)
- Ridership: (2025)

History
- Opened: November 16, 2009
- Closed: January 4, 2026

Technical
- Line length: 40.1 miles (64.5 km)
- Track gauge: 4 ft 8 1/2 in (1,435 mm) standard gauge
- Operating speed: 79 mph (127 km/h) maximum 47 mph (76 km/h) average
Route map
Northstar Line Map (with stations)

The Northstar Line (reporting mark MNRX) was a commuter rail route in Minnesota. Northstar ran 40 miles (64 km) from Big Lake to downtown Minneapolis at Target Field using existing track and right-of-way owned by the BNSF Railway. Passenger service began on November 16, 2009. The rail line served as part of the Northstar Corridor between Minneapolis and St. Cloud. Planning for the line began in 1997, when the Northstar Corridor Development Authority (NCDA) was formed. The corridor was also served by Interstate 94 and U.S. Highway 10. In 2025, the system had a ridership of , or about per weekday as of the second quarter of 2026. In August 2025, Metro Transit officially announced the termination of the line in favor of bus service. The last trains ran on January 4, 2026, with replacement bus service beginning on January 5, 2026.

== Background ==
The route was initially designed to run the full distance of 81.8 miles (131.6 km) between Minneapolis and Rice, Minnesota, northwest of St. Cloud, with 11 stations. The Minnesota Department of Transportation (MnDOT) submitted a Draft Environmental Impact Statement and Final Environmental Impact Statement in October 2000 and March 2002, respectively, and in turn the Federal Transit Administration (FTA) concluded the process with a Record of Decision in December 2002. The project was counting on federal funding for half of its construction costs, but estimated ridership for the full route was not high enough to qualify for that federal funding. To produce a more favorable proposal, project partners modified the Locally Preferred Alternative and defined a Minimum Operable Segment, which halved the line's length to 40.1 miles (64.5 km), terminating at Big Lake and eliminating the three stations in Rice, St. Cloud, and Becker. Later modifications further reduced the scope of Northstar service, reducing daily trains from 18 to 12, and deferring stations at Coon Rapids–Foley Boulevard and Northeast Minneapolis at 7th Street. To comply with the FTA's Record of Decision, the Minimum Operable Segment became Phase I; completing the line to Rice. Construction of the remaining five stations would occur at an undetermined later date as Phase II.

Several public demonstrations of commuter rail service on the Northstar corridor were trialed by MnDOT from 1997 to 2002. A 300-seat train was operated from St. Cloud to Minneapolis on January 28, 2002, using two bilevel passenger cars that were being delivered to Sound Transit in Seattle for use on the Sounder commuter rail system. The public were allowed to ride with an advance reservation.

When the line was first proposed, then-Governor Jesse Ventura was an early advocate of the rail line. Ventura's successor, Governor Tim Pawlenty, did not initially support it. He changed his mind after MnDOT determined that a scaled-back version of the line would qualify for federal funding.

The 2004 Minnesota Legislative session did not pass a bonding bill, which meant a lack of funds for initial project work. Some counties in the area and the Metropolitan Council came up with matching funds to allow funding from the United States federal government to continue. During the 2005 state legislative session, a bonding bill including $37.5 million of funding for the proposed project was passed. The bill was signed on April 11, 2005, by Governor Tim Pawlenty at the site of the Riverdale station in Coon Rapids. The 2006 state legislature, along with city, county and federal governments, provided funding to complete the corridor to Big Lake.

Construction began on the maintenance facility near Big Lake station and on the Blue Line light rail extension in September 2007, before full funding for the line had been secured. On December 11, 2007, U.S. Deputy Secretary of Transportation Thomas Barrett met with Governor Pawlenty in Anoka County and officially signed a Full Funding Grant Agreement of $156.8 million, nearly half of the funding for the $317 million, 40-mile (64 km) line from Minneapolis to Big Lake. The money enabled the release of an additional $97.5 million in state bonding money set aside for the project.

The federal government invested $156.8 million, the state paid $98.6 million and the Anoka County Regional Rail Authority pledged $34.8 million. The remaining partners were Sherburne County Regional Rail Authority ($8.2 million), Hennepin County Regional Rail Authority ($8 million), the Metropolitan Council ($5.9 million) and the Minnesota Twins ($2.6 million, for the station improvements under the new Target Field where the Minneapolis station was constructed). Of the $317 million total, $107.5 million went to paying BNSF for a perpetual easement for track rights and facilities along the line and to pay the BNSF employees that operate the trains. The operating budget for the first full year of service (2010) was $16.8 million.

=== Corridor buses ===
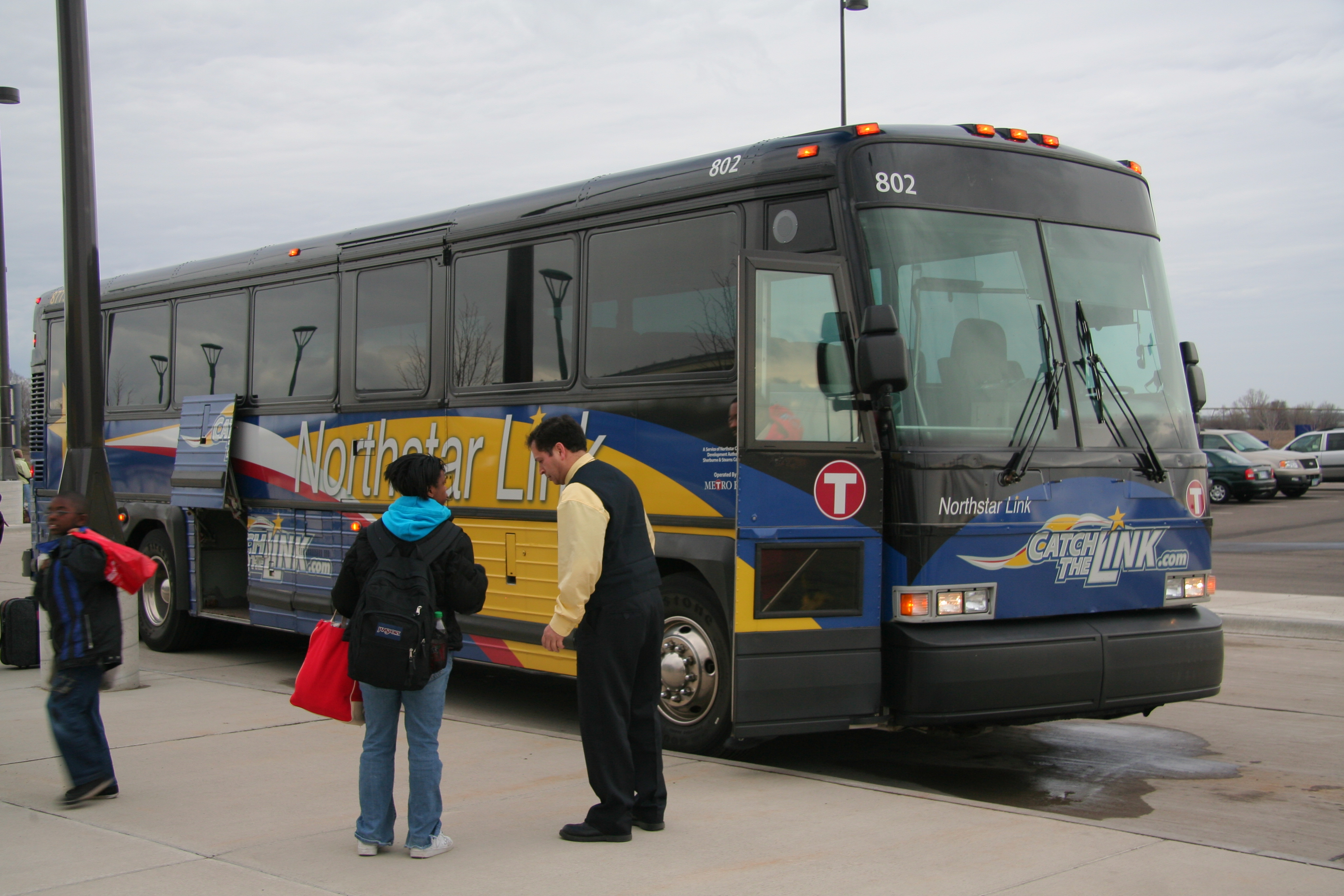
Bus at Big Lake Northstar Commuter Rail station in 2010

During development of the rail line, MnDOT initiated an interim commuter bus, Northstar Commuter Coach, in response to worsening highway congestion and lack of transit alternatives in the corridor. The service stopped at future Elk River and Riverdale station sites, and terminated in downtown Minneapolis at Ramp B/5th Street Transit Center adjacent to the future Target Field Station. Inaugurated October 1, 2001, the route operated eight round-trips during weekdays and averaged 225 daily riders in its first year of service. Operations were transferred to NCDA in 2003 and the route was discontinued with the opening of the commuter rail line in 2009.

On January 22, 2007, an additional commuter bus, Ramsey Star Express, began operating in the corridor. The route, sponsored by the City of Ramsey and operated by Metro Transit, provided four round-trips on weekdays between Ramsey station and Ramp B/5th Street Transit Center in downtown Minneapolis. The route saw an average of 115 daily riders. A rail station was previously considered in Ramsey but was eliminated before the Final Environmental Impact Statements were released. However, in an effort to bolster Northstar ridership, an infill station at the same site was completed in 2012 and bus service was discontinued, saving the city $500,000 annually.

Metro Transit route restructuring in late 2000 resulted in the creation of express bus routes 850, 851, and 852 to downtown Minneapolis. Route 851 served the Riverdale station site and the vicinity of the future Anoka station. Routes 850 and 852 primarily serve the Foley Boulevard station, providing local service north and connecting to two Northstar stations. Route 851 was discontinued after the opening of rail service and because no station has been built at the existing Foley Boulevard park and ride Routes 850 and 852 remain in operation.

== Construction and operation ==
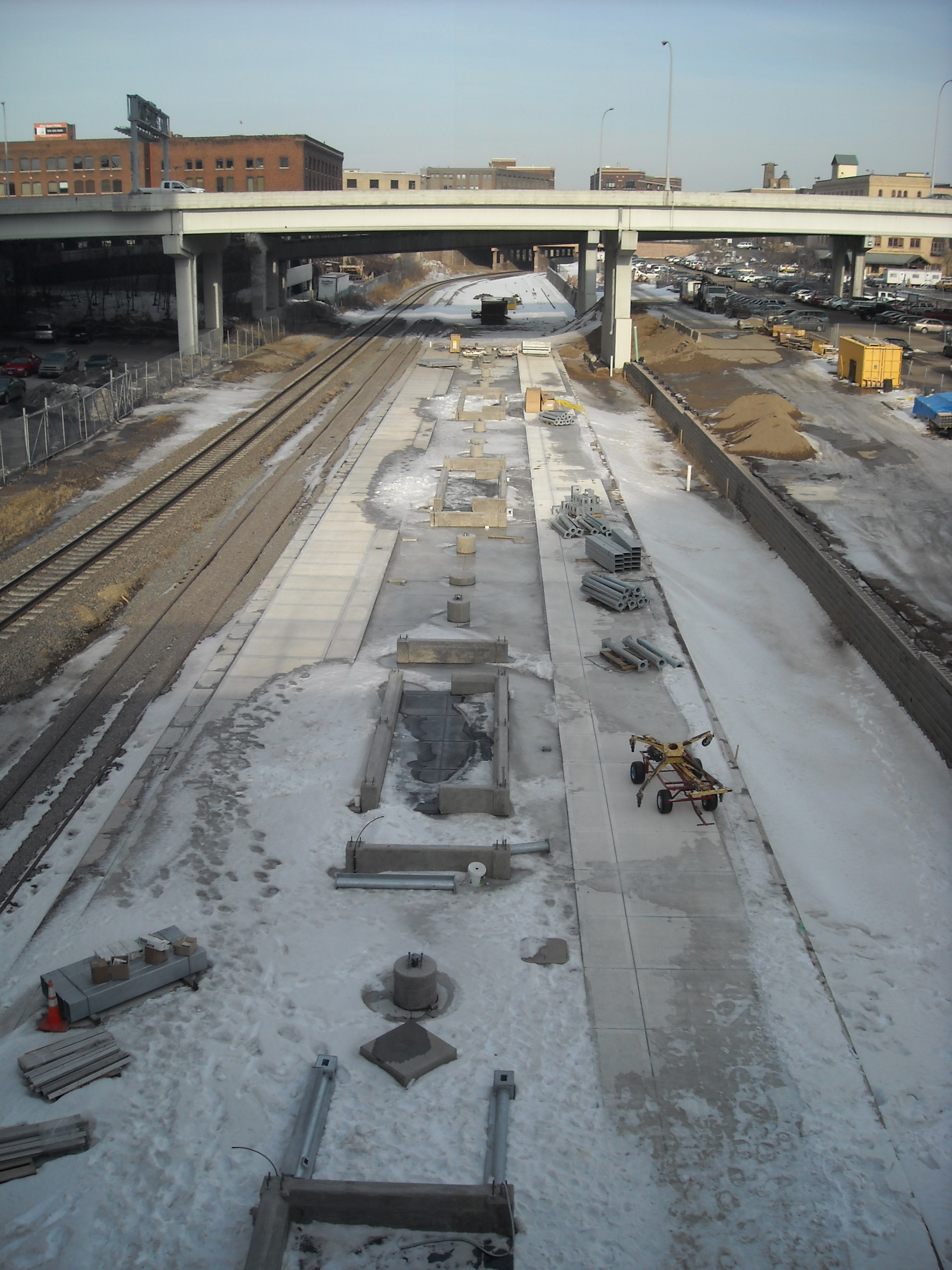
The platforms at Target Field under construction in 2009

The Minnesota Department of Transportation (Mn/DOT) and the Northstar Corridor Development Authority (NCDA) studied options to handle the increasing commuter load and felt that a commuter rail line was the best option. Development of the corridor was expected to cost about US$265 million in 2008 dollars, estimated to be less than one-third the cost of upgrading existing highways, though the cost would later climb to $317 million. Because most of the route already existed, the investment went into building new stations, upgrading track, enhancing the safety of crossings, and updating signals. A significant portion of the funds were used to extend the METRO Blue Line to the Target Field station on the west side of Interstate 394 and 5th Street in downtown Minneapolis. This terminal station was integrated into the Minnesota Twins' new ballpark, Target Field, which opened in March 2010.

During normal operation, the line had six trains running in the morning and evening rush hour periods, with limited service on weekends and holidays. Bus feeder lines, including the Northstar Link from St. Cloud to Big Lake station, brought residents along the corridor to the nearest train station. Once downtown, commuters could walk upstairs to the METRO Blue and Green Lines, take a bus to other areas of the city, or go into one of the nearby buildings integrated into the Minneapolis skyway system. In 2010, Metro Ridership fell well short of its first-year goal of 3,400 weekday trips from this station. Metro Transit had a goal of 5,900 by 2030 intending to save commuters 900,000 hours over the course of a year when compared to taking a dedicated bus line.

From its opening until January 2014, Northstar trains arrived on time for 96 percent of trips, making it one of the most reliable services from Metro Transit. Starting in the winter of 2014, on-time performance suffered due to heavy freight traffic and severe cold weather. By the end of February 2014, on-time reliability was down to 74 percent. Freight traffic from the North Dakota oil boom contributed to congestion and delays for trains. The delays were also felt by the Amtrak Empire Builder route which travels through the same corridor. Delays were severe enough for legislators to hold a public hearing at the State Capitol with BNSF in attendance. During the hearing, BNSF stated that delays were due to cold weather and not freight traffic. The cold weather had caused mechanical issues and limited how long crews could work outside. BNSF spent money on repairs and maintenance along the corridor through 2014, which included replacing ties and switches, and adding covers, which would protect switches from ice and snow. While January through October 2014 saw trains arriving on-time just 65.7 percent of the time, during the month of December trains were back to 95 percent on-time performance. Metro Transit offered refunds to customers whose trains were more than 10 minutes late in January and February 2015 in an effort to draw back ridership. During January 2015, trips were on time 98% of the time.

== Ridership ==
Annual Passenger Ridership
Year	Ridership	% Change
2009	78,782	-
2010	710,426	801.8%
2011	703,427	−1.3%
2012	700,276	−0.4%
2013	787,239	12.3%
2014	721,214	−8.4%
2015	722,637	0.2%
2016	711,168	−1.6%
2017	793,796	11.6%
2018	787,327	−0.8%
2019	767,500	−2.5%
2020	152,600	−80.1%
2021	50,433	−67%
2022	77,076	52.8%
2023	97,264	26.2%
2024	127,400	40%
2025	121,800	-4.39%

Ridership in the first 15 days averaged 2,207 per day (33,112 total), just short of the goal of 2,460. By the end of January 2010, goals had been exceeded by 3%. Ridership for 2010 was originally projected to be 897,000, though ultimately ended up being 715,000. Because ridership varied significantly through the course of a year, Metro Transit's month-to-month goals were different from the yearly average goal. Daily ridership was 2,814 in early 2019, the same level it was in 2017. Ridership was projected to be 5,590 in 2025 and 6,200 in 2030, according to a 2009 study by Kimley-Horn and Associates Inc.

In 2019 Northstar averaged 2,660 weekday rides and 705 weekend rides. Event service comprised 31–37% of total annual boardings. Due to the COVID-19 pandemic, ridership dropped to 152,600 passengers in 2020 and 50,433 in 2021. Ridership never recovered to pre-pandemic levels before closure.

== Route ==
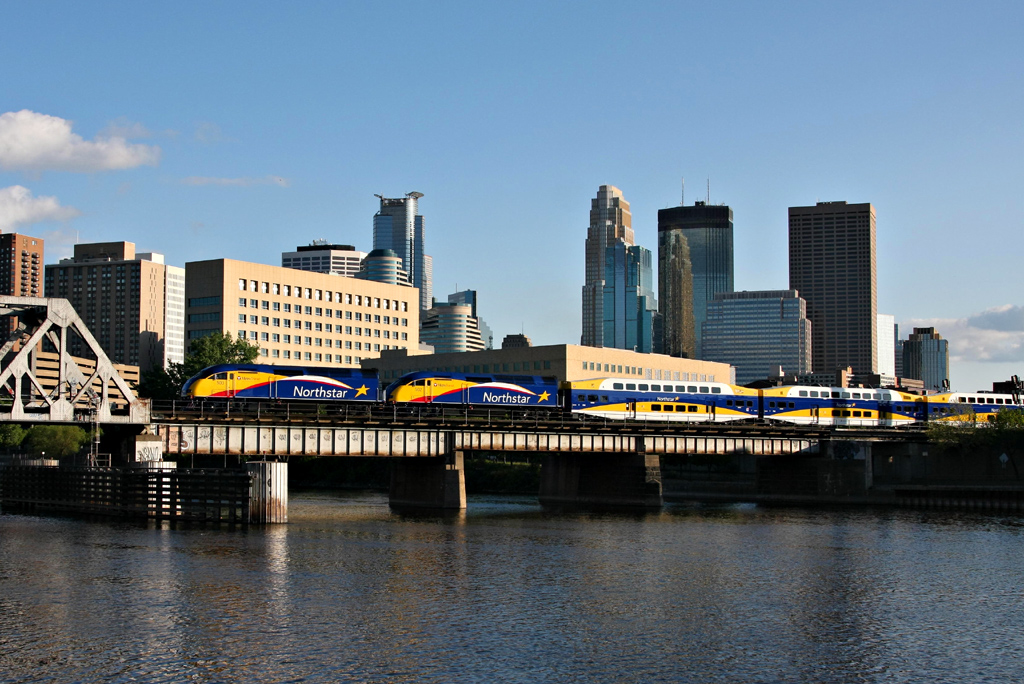
A Northstar train crosses the Mississippi River at Nicollet Island

At Target Field Station, the parallel rail lines of the old Great Northern Railway (north-side track, now BNSF) and the Minneapolis and St. Louis Railway (south-side track, now Union Pacific) traveled eastbound past the Federal Reserve Bank and the site of the old Minneapolis Great Northern Depot, across the Mississippi River on the Minneapolis BNSF Rail Bridge and then across Nicollet Island. At a wye, the route turned northwest to the GN East side line, which then joined the parallel ex-Northern Pacific main line. The ex-Great Northern and ex-Northern Pacific lines merged into BNSF, becoming the BNSF Northern Transcon (transcontinental) line.

The route traveled north through the Northtown Classification Yards, over Interstate 694 and made its first stop at 61st Avenue in Fridley at the yard limit of Northtown, where it entered BNSF's Staples Subdivision. The double track line continued past the current Foley Boulevard park-and-ride bus station, which was planned to be a future Northstar station and turned northwest at Coon Creek Junction, where the old GN route to Duluth (now BNSF's Hinckley Subdivision) split off and headed straight north. The current Coon Rapids station sat behind the Riverdale shopping center by Round Lake Boulevard and new stations were also built in Anoka, Elk River, and Big Lake.

The Great Northern Railway and Northern Pacific Railway had local services from Minneapolis to all of the cities served by Northstar up through the early 20th century. One Fridley station was about a mile north, at Mississippi Boulevard. There was a stop shared by GN and NP at Coon Creek Junction. There were at least three stations built in Anoka over the years, and two stations in Elk River and Big Lake, with both cities having one stop for each railroad.

== Upgrades and planned extension to St. Cloud ==
The double-track main line between Northtown Yard in Minneapolis and Coon Creek Junction in Coon Rapids was the busiest rail corridor in the Twin Cities metropolitan area. In July 2009, before the Northstar Commuter Rail commuter line began operation, this segment had hosted 63 trains per day. The Minnesota Department of Transportation wanted to run more passenger trains through the corridor, including Northstar and other proposed passenger rail routes like the proposed Northern Lights Express to Duluth. A $113.4 million project to add a third main line and a new station at Foley Boulevard in Coon Rapids was planned. A $99 million grant request was filed under the American Recovery and Reinvestment Act of 2009 to cover most of the cost. TIGER grants were expected to be awarded on February 17, 2010.

Foley station was cut from the Northstar plan in 2003 while federal funding was being sought prior to construction. Despite the fact the 3,200-stall parking facility already existed (sans boarding platforms), riders would not save enough time by switching from existing bus service to rail to make the stop fit within the guidelines enforced by Federal Transit Administration's cost-effectiveness index. A station in Ramsey at Ramsey Town Center was also cut prior to construction. Ramsey station construction has since been fully funded, and construction began on March 27, 2012; it was completed on November 8 and opened on November 14, 2012.

A major obstacle to extending Northstar to St. Cloud had been the lack of double-tracked rail for nine miles (14 km) from Big Lake to Becker. However, due to increased freight traffic on the line, BNSF double-tracked the corridor in 2015. The Minnesota Department of Transportation said that extending Northstar would result in 1 to 1.5 million annual trips on the line. In its 2010 State Rail Plan, the agency expected farebox recovery ratios to be between 70% and 111% on the full line. However, the same plan estimated farebox recovery ratios of just 21% to 34% on the proposed Northern Lights Express, which in a 2007 business plan had calculated ratios of over 100%. On November 8, 2010, it was announced that the planned extension of the line to St. Cloud had been indefinitely delayed. Projected ridership was not sufficient to qualify for federal funding.

Proposals to extend the line continued to surface in the years following its opening. In 2016 and 2018, Minnesota state legislators proposed extending the line to St. Cloud using existing equipment by running two daily round-trips to St. Cloud and reducing other trips to Minneapolis from five to four. Governor Mark Dayton proposed a six-month demonstration service to St. Cloud in 2017 but the demonstration would have only included 1 round trip per day, without stopping at stations between Minneapolis and St. Cloud. Extending the line to Camp Ripley was proposed in 2019 by House of Representative legislators. Another extension feasibility study sponsored by MnDOT was released in July 2020.

Possible extension of the line was revived in the 2022 Transportation Omnibus bill passed by the MN legislature. The bill funded a study that have considered different possible rail service to the St. Cloud and Fargo-Moorhead regions. The study identified an increased demand for intercity passenger rail service, and explored proposals including the Northstar extension and a new intercity passenger service.

== Pandemic and termination ==
In 2020, due to the Covid-19 pandemic, Metro Transit eliminated weekend service and special event service. Weekly trips dropped from 72 to 20. Ridership on the line was down 95% in August 2020 compared to levels before the pandemic. Lakeville's state representative, Jon Koznick, proposed shuttering Northstar operations in 2021, but that would have required the repayment of $85 million in federal funds used to construct the project. The Republican-controlled Minnesota Senate proposed closing Northstar in the 2022 legislative session and included asking the federal government to not require the repayment of federal funds.

Metro Transit and MnDOT in combination with three counties that Northstar operated in—Anoka County, Hennepin County, and Sherburne County—agreed to a master funding agreement in 2018 that covered operating expenses through 2022. Anoka County ceased paying their financial contribution by the second half of 2020. The county requested a reduced payment due to reduced ridership. By 2022, the county owed Metro Transit $7.9 million for operating expenses stretching from 2020 to 2022. Special event service to Minnesota Twins games was not offered in 2022 due to the funding issue. Northstar served 81,561 rides to 64 Minnesota Twins games in 2019.

Anoka County ended up paying Metro Transit for 2020 and 2021 operating expenses after the 2021 bill was reduced from nearly $6 million to $1.95 million due to funds from BNSF and federal COVID relief bills. For the 2022 operating budget, Anoka County considered a $1.95 million payment to be their "full and final payment for 2022" despite Metro Transit requesting $4.6 million. Anoka County argued that they should pay the same amount in 2021 and 2022 because the same amount of service was being offered. Metro Transit stated it could not increase service without funds covering the full operating costs of the line.

In March 2023, the Metropolitan Council published a study on the future of Northstar that was not intended to produce any decisions or recommendations.

Construction of the Northern Lights Express from Downtown Minneapolis to Duluth would have added a station at Coon-Rapids Foley Boulevard. It would have allowed for transfers between Northstar and NLX trains to other Amtrak intercity routes.

On October 2, 2023, service was increased to four round-trips every weekday, including one reverse peak trip. Special event service returned, serving Twins and Vikings games. There was still no weekend service. An increase in the sales tax in the seven-county metropolitan area approved in the 2023 Minnesota legislative session would have helped cover the increased expenses.

As northern Anoka County grew more Republican, bipartisan political support waned. On February 23, 2025, Minnesota State House Representative Jon Koznick, serving as the chair of the House Transportation Finance and Policy Committee and a critic of Northstar, advanced a bill in the state house to terminate operations on the line, claiming that the line did not reduce congestion. Shortly after Koznick's bill was sent to the General Register, the Minnesota Department of Transportation and Metropolitan Council released a statement that the agencies had "jointly started the process to explore transitioning to bus service." In August 2025, the agency officially announced the termination of the line in favor of bus service, to go into effect in January 2026. The last trains on the line ran on January 4, 2026, serving a Vikings–Packers game, with replacement bus service commencing on January 5, 2026.

== Stations ==
County	Location	Station	Connections and notes
Hennepin	Minneapolis	Target Field	METRO: Blue Green; Metro Transit: Routes 14, 94, 355, 363; FlixBus, Greyhound, Jefferson Lines, Land to Air Express
Anoka	Fridley	Fridley	Metro Transit: Route 852
Anoka	Coon Rapids	Foley Boulevard	Planned infill station at existing park and ride.
Anoka	Coon Rapids	Riverdale	Metro Transit: Route 850
Anoka	Anoka	Anoka	Metro Transit: Route 805
Anoka	Ramsey	Ramsey	Opened November 14, 2012
Sherburne	Elk River	Elk River	
Sherburne	Big Lake	Big Lake	Metro Bus: Northstar Link (Route 887) to St. Cloud; Northern terminus.
Sherburne	St. Cloud	St. Cloud	Amtrak: Empire Builder; Metro Bus: Routes 6, 21, 22; Proposed extension to existing Amtrak station.

=== Cancelled/deferred stations ===
After the project was split into two phases, three stations beyond the Minimum Operable Segment were indefinitely postponed; St. Cloud East and Becker at existing park and rides, as well as a layover facility and terminus in Rice. St. Cloud East and Becker were served by the Northstar Link bus. Between the Draft and Final Environmental Impact Statement station, sites at the existing Amtrak station in Downtown St. Cloud, Clear Lake and Ramsey were eliminated. A Ramsey station was, however, constructed in 2012.

Late in the project's development, a station in Northeast Minneapolis was added to the plan, with the goal of increasing ridership. Located in the dense neighborhood at 7th Street near Central Avenue, the station would have provided connections to several bus routes and a proposed streetcar line. This station and one at Foley Boulevard, one of Metro Transit's largest and most-utilized park and rides, were deferred as the FTA's funding formula shifted from attracting new riders to cost-effectiveness. Becker and Northeast Minneapolis stations were quietly dropped from the plan. Future service at Coon Rapids–Foley Boulevard station was packaged in with the separate Northern Lights Express project, which assumed construction of a new station.

The Fridley station was originally deferred but was added back late during construction after the Counties Transit Improvement Board allocated money towards the station, allowing it to open with the rest of the line.

== Rolling stock ==
A Northstar locomotive leased to Sound Transit in Seattle to operate Sounder commuter rail

The line opened in 2009 with five MPI MP36PH-3C locomotives and seventeen Bombardier BiLevel Coach cars. Each passenger car had about 140 seats and room for 355 when full with standees. The coaches had two doors on either side. Upon opening, Metro Transit immediately announced that a sixth locomotive was being acquired from the Utah Transit Authority's FrontRunner service in the Salt Lake City area and a lease agreement was soon signed. Typical weekday operation required five trains, each consisting of one locomotive and three or four coaches. A single train was used for weekend service, making three round trips each day. The platforms were only designed for five-car trains, so longer trains would have required additional construction.

Metro Transit did begin experimenting in April 2010 with six-car trains for taking riders to and from weekend Twins games at Target Field. These trains overhung the platform at either end and only opened from one door on each of the end cars. In May, trains serving Twins games grew to eight cars, with some completely overhanging the platforms so some riders would have to board and then walk from one car to another. By June, Metro Transit had decided to purchase the sixth locomotive it had leased from UTA (No. 512) due to high leasing costs and the need to have an extra locomotive while others were being repaired or inspected. A $10.1 million contingency fund built into the original cost of the service provided $2.85 million towards buying the locomotive and repainting it in Northstar livery.

With Northstar shut down due to declining ridership, Trinity Railway Express in Dallas leased two Northstar locomotives and eight Northstar bilevel coaches in preparation for the 2026 FIFA World Cup. Amtrak was also considering leasing one locomotive, three coaches, and one cab car for use between Chicago and Milwaukee to fulfill demand after pulling their Horizons from service in late March.

Manufacturer	Model	Inventory	Number	Image
MotivePower	MP36PH-3C	6	501–505, 512	
Bombardier	BiLevel Coach	12	701–712	
Bombardier	BiLevel Cab Cars	6	601–606	
