= Minneapolis BNSF Rail Bridge =

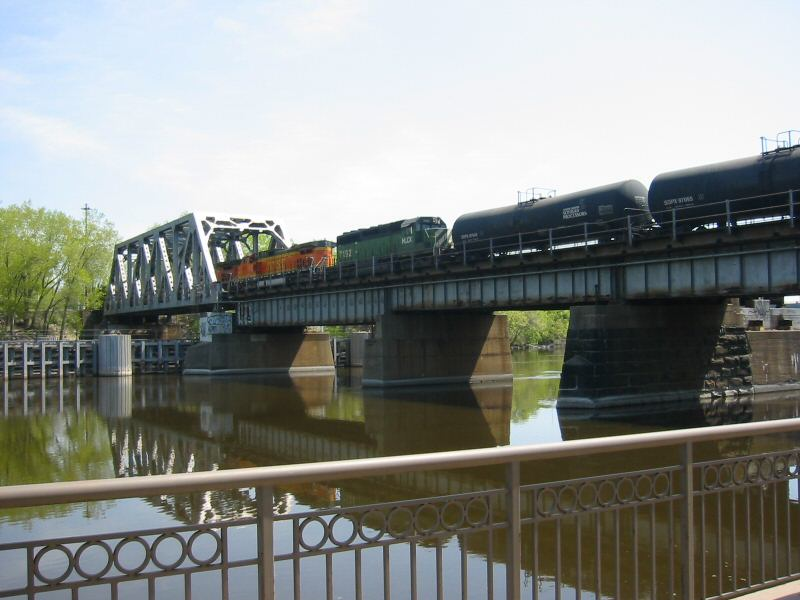
- A look at the bridge from the north side, from the west bank of the river.
- Coordinates: 44°59′16″N 93°15′57″W
- Carries: Two tracks of the BNSF Railway's Wayzata Subdivision
- Crosses: Mississippi River
- Locale: Minneapolis, Minnesota
- Maintained by: BNSF Railway
- ID number: A1.3

Characteristics
- Design: One truss span, three plate girder spans, and three concrete girder spans
- Total length: 550 feet (170 m)
- Width: 33 feet 6 inches (10.21 m)
- Longest span: 171 feet (52 m)
- Clearance below: 24 feet (7.3 m)

History
- Opened: 1893

Location
- Interactive map of Minneapolis BNSF Rail Bridge

Minneapolis BNSF Rail Bridge is a combination plate girder bridge and truss bridge that spans the main channel of the Mississippi River between downtown Minneapolis, Minnesota and Nicollet Island in Minneapolis. It is located adjacent to the current Federal Reserve Bank of Minneapolis.

== History ==
It was built in 1893 by the Great Northern Railway and remodeled in 1926. It replaced a bridge built at the same location in 1867 for the St. Paul and Pacific Railroad. This was the first Mississippi river railroad crossing in Minneapolis.

== Current construction ==
In 1963, two of the girder spans and a pier were removed, and a Petit truss span was added in its place. This was done to allow upstream navigation past St. Anthony Falls for barges. The Petit truss design is unusual for the Mississippi River and is one of three on the island (Boom Island and Nicollet Island Inn bridges are Petit truss spans, too).

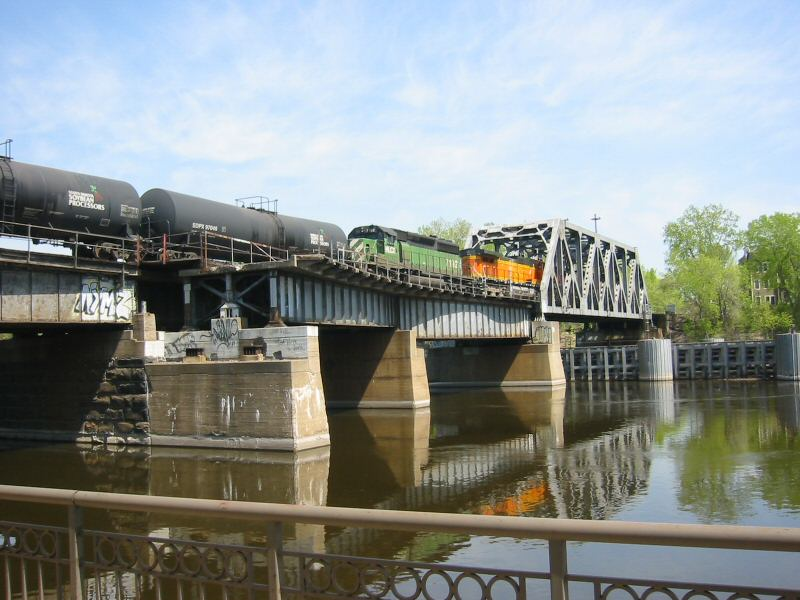
The south side of the BNSF bridge

The south side of the bridge has an unusual protrusion coming out of it. There was once a curved bridge coming off the end going to the Minneapolis Union Depot (later the Minneapolis Great Northern Depot). When passenger service was discontinued from downtown Minneapolis and West River Parkway was built, the curve and the trackage going to the depot was removed, most likely in or around 1978 with the demolition of the depot.

== Usage ==
The St. Paul and Pacific Railroad eventually became the St. Paul, Minneapolis, and Manitoba Railway, then Great Northern Railway, Burlington Northern and eventually the BNSF Railway. It currently serves the branches to Willmar and Monticello, as well as providing access to interchange for the Twin Cities and Western Railway.

The bridge carried the Northstar Line commuter rail service between Target Field and Fridley stations from 2009 to 2026.
