= Staples station =

Amtrak intercity train station in Staples, Minnesota

Staples, MN
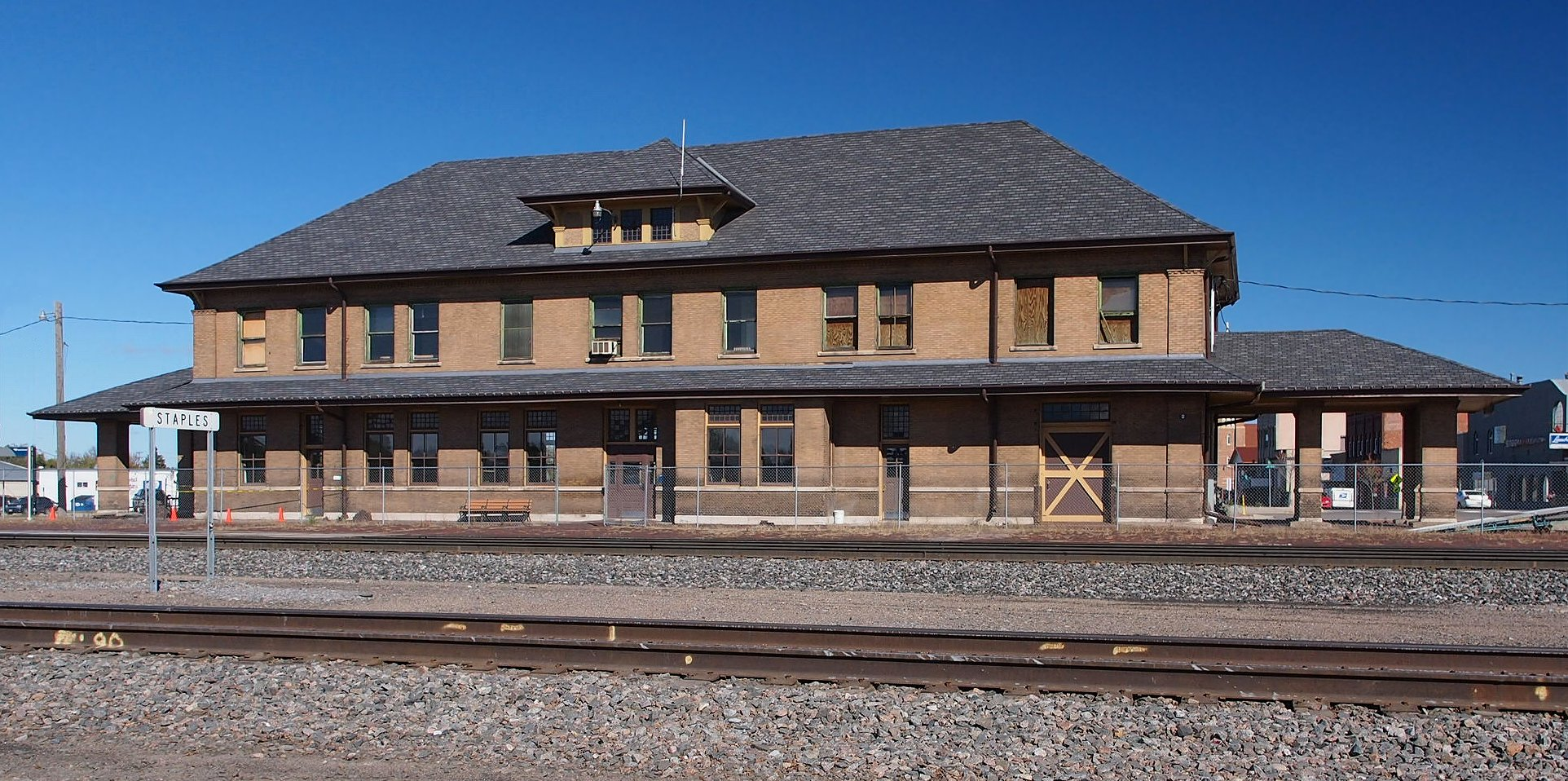
- The Staples depot from the south-southeast

General information
- Location: First & Fourth Avenues; Staples, Minnesota; United States
- Coordinates: 46°21′16″N 94°47′43″W
- Line: BNSF Staples Subdivision
- Platforms: 1 side platform (1 island platform removed)
- Tracks: 3

Construction
- Parking: Yes
- Accessible: Yes

Other information
- Station code: Amtrak: SPL

History
- Opened: 1909

Passengers
- FY 2025: 6,692 (Amtrak)

Services
Preceding station	Amtrak	Following station
Detroit Lakes toward Seattle or Portland	Empire Builder	St. Cloud toward Chicago
Former services
Preceding station	Northern Pacific Railway	Following station
Aldrich toward Seattle or Tacoma	Main Line	Philbrook toward St. Paul
Wadena toward Winnipeg	Winnipeg – St. Paul	Little Falls toward St. Paul
Terminus	Staples – Duluth	Hayden toward Duluth
- Northern Pacific Railway Depot and Freighthouse
- U.S. National Register of Historic Places
- Built: 1902
- Architect: Northern Pacific Railway Engineering Dept
- Architectural style: Classic Revival
- NRHP reference No.: 85003613
- Added to NRHP: June 13, 2008
Location

Staples station is an Amtrak intercity train station in Staples, Minnesota, United States, served by Amtrak's daily Empire Builder service. It was built in December 1909 by the Northern Pacific Railway. The architects of the station were Charles A. Reed and Allen H. Stem, who also designed the Northern Pacific's King Street Station in Seattle, Washington, and the New York Central Railroad's Grand Central Terminal in New York City.

In the mid-2000s the city began negotiations with BNSF with the intent to purchase and rehabilitate the depot, which was largely empty and not well maintained. The sale was finalized in February 2008 and the depot is now owned and managed by the Staples Historical Society (SHS). Since then the SHS has undertaken a handful of important improvement projects, such as installing a new roof and repairing historic windows. The group is also searching for funding to undertake a full-scale rehabilitation of the interior and mechanical systems. Ultimately the SHS hopes to restore the second floor so that it can house the Staples Historical Society Museum. The local chamber of commerce currently occupies the ticket office adjacent to the waiting room.

The station was listed on the National Register of Historic Places on June 13, 2008.

The station is one of three in Minnesota and 78 across the Amtrak network listed in a 2021 settlement with the U.S. Department of Justice over inaccessible facilities under the Americans with Disabilities Act. Under the ADA Stations Program (ADASP), Amtrak plans to update the station with new platforms, walkways, railings, signage and other improvements by the company's fiscal year 2026.

In 2023, $4 million was included in the Minnesota state budget to study a daytime train service between the Twin Cities and Fargo, North Dakota, a service that would include stops at Staples station.
