= Fridley station =

Former commuter rail station in Fridley, Minnesota

Fridley
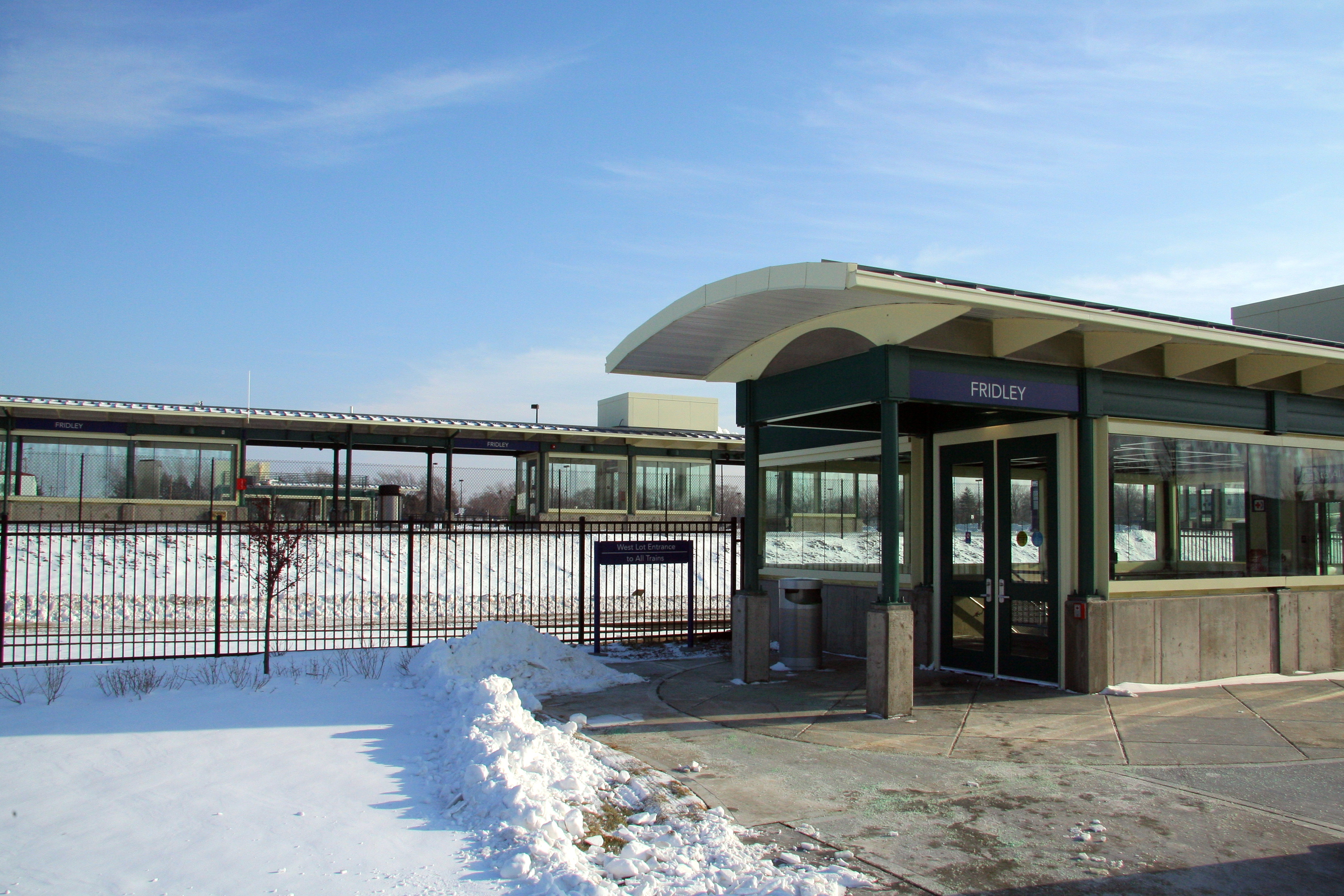
- Fridley station with the west tunnel entrance in the foreground.

General information
- Location: 61st Way & East River Road NE (west lot); 61st Ave & Main Street NE (east lot); Fridley, Minnesota
- Coordinates: 45°04′44″N 93°16′16″W
- Line: BNSF Staples Subdivision
- Platforms: 1 island platform (only one side in use)
- Tracks: 5 (only one serves platform)
- Connections: Metro Transit: 10, 824, 852

Construction
- Parking: 611 spaces
- Accessible: Yes

History
- Opened: November 16, 2009
- Closed: January 4, 2026
Former services
Preceding station	Metro Transit	Following station
Coon Rapids–Riverdale toward Big Lake	Northstar Line	Target Field Terminus
Preceding station	Great Northern Railway	Following station
Coon Rapids toward Milaca	Milaca – Minneapolis	Minneapolis Terminus
Track layout
Location

Fridley station was a commuter rail station in Fridley, Minnesota, located at Main Street NE and 61st Avenue NE. It was served by the Northstar Line. The station featured bicycle lockers and two park and ride lots with a total capacity of 611 spaces. The commute time to downtown Minneapolis from this station is about 20 minutes. The station had a single platform on one main track, which is accessible on either side of the tracks through a tunnel.

== History ==
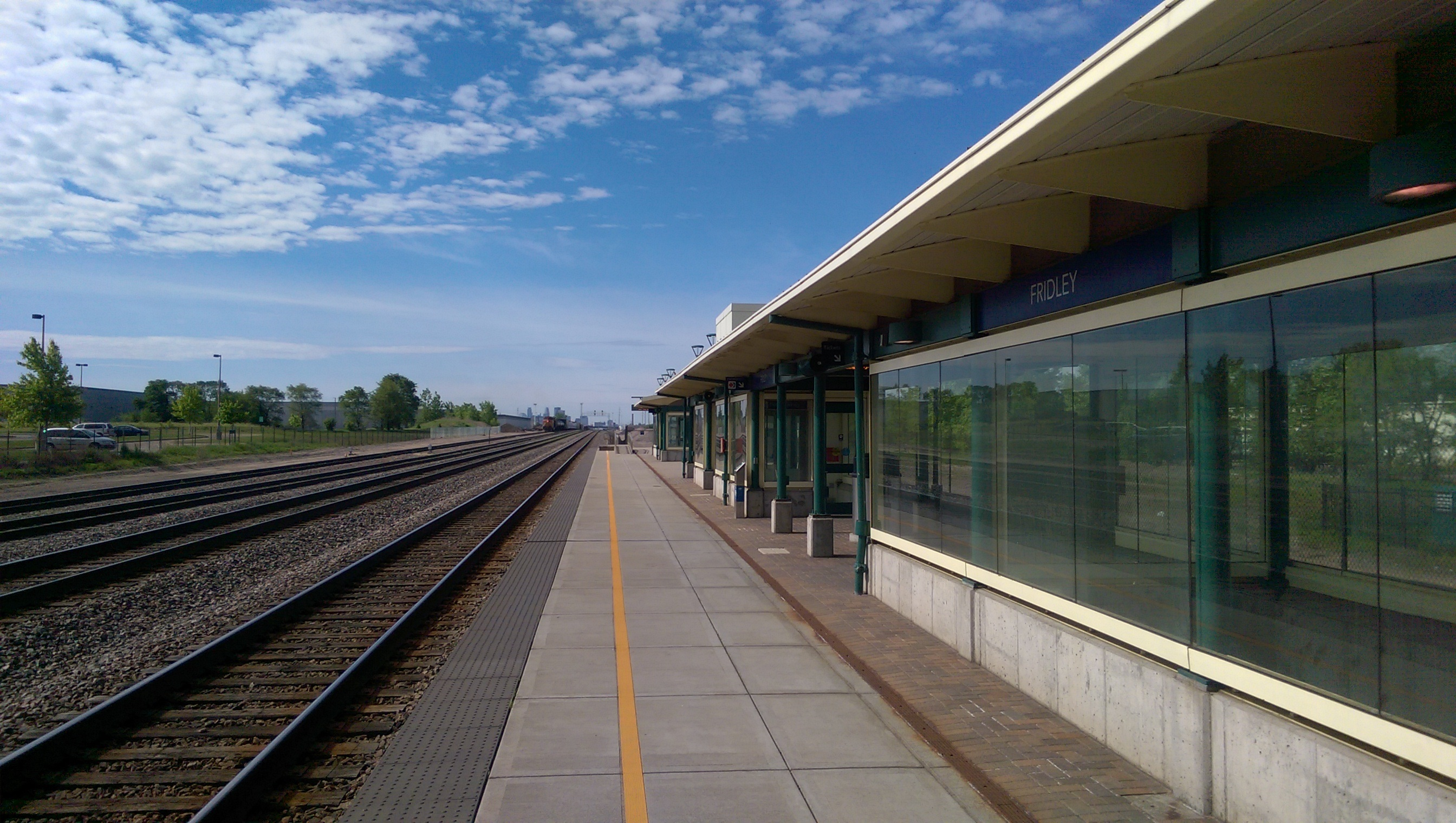
Platform of the Fridley Northstar station looking South towards Minneapolis

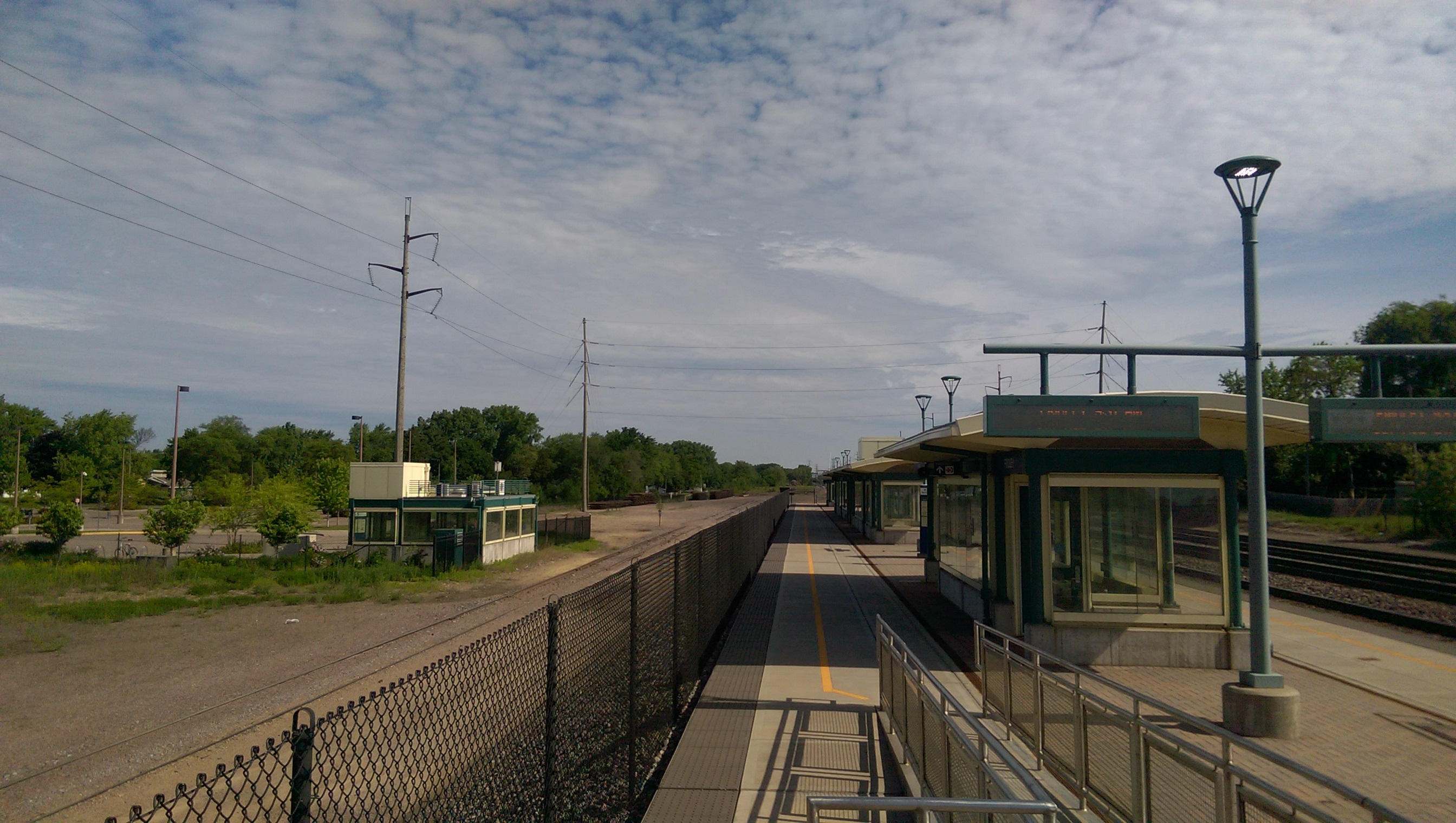
Platform of the Fridley Northstar station looking North

The double tracked main line for the BNSF Railway transcontinental railroad travels through Fridley after leaving Minneapolis. It runs parallel to the Mississippi River. The former Northern Pacific Railway and Great Northern Railway parallel main lines form this double track main. Fridley had been served by a flag stop station at Mississippi Boulevard between East River Road and University Avenue by both railroads. In 1909, A "small shed used jointly as a depot serves the patrons of both roads" was reported. The Minneapolis, Anoka and Cuyuna Range Railway, whose tracks ran along East River Road also had a station at Mississippi Boulevard. That location is 1/2 mile from the current station. One mile further north from the Mississippi Boulevard station was another station called Belt Line Junction.

With the elimination of commuter service to Anoka, Fridley had not been served by commuter rail. Metro Transit buses extend through Fridley.

Fridley station was planned as part of the Northstar Line project. The cost of construction was $9.9 million. The station was eliminated to save money because of a federal funding shortage. In late October 2008, the Counties Transit Improvement Board, which oversees spending of the new quarter-cent transit sales tax approved this year by the Minnesota state Legislature and five Twin Cities metro-area counties, decided to make the Fridley project one of its first funding priorities.

The connecting tunnel was completed by BNSF Railway crews over the Memorial Day weekend in May 2008 because the City of Fridley committed money to the project and spent $3.2 million to acquire 10 acres (40,000 m^{2}) for parking.

== Third main line ==
Fridley station was at the westbound yard limit of the BNSF Railway Northtown classification yard. There are multiple rail sidings in the area on both sides of the double track main line. The station had only one side of the platform in use, requiring the Northstar train to be on that track when traveling inbound to or outbound from Minneapolis. Trains cross to and from that track at Coon Creek Junction. The eventual plan is that BNSF will construct a third main line in the area, running from East Interstate (the bridge over Interstate 694) to Coon Creek Junction in Coon Rapids. This is a Transportation Investments Generating Economic Recovery (TIGER) grant application submitted to the American Recovery and Reinvestment Act. The third main line would improve capacity on the busiest rail corridor in the Twin Cities metropolitan area. In July 2009, this segment hosted 63 trains per day, before the 12 daily trips for Northstar are added. At Coon Creek Junction, 12 trains per day cut off to the Duluth line. The completion of the third main line would include construction of the Foley Boulevard station and would allow for 22 more passenger trains per day for the proposed Northern Lights Express, Amtrak, and possibly other services.
