= Jon Koznick =

American politician

Member of the Minnesota House of Representatives from the 57A district
- Incumbent
- Assumed office January 6, 2015
- Preceded by: Mary Liz Holberg

Personal details
- Born: July 4, 1972 (age 54) Colombia
- Party: Republican
- Spouse: Patty
- Children: 2
- Education: St. Cloud State University (B.S.)
- Occupation: Business Owner; Real Estate; Legislator
- Website: Government website Campaign website

Jon Koznick (/ˈkɒznɪk/ KOZ-nik; born July 4, 1972) is an American politician serving in the Minnesota House of Representatives since 2015. A member of the Republican Party of Minnesota, Koznick represents District 57A in the southern Twin Cities metropolitan area, which includes the city of Lakeville and parts of Dakota and Scott Counties.

== Early life, education, and career ==
Koznick was born in Colombia. After the death of his mother, he was placed in an orphanage at age five. He was soon adopted and brought to the United States.

Koznick attended St. Cloud State University, graduating with a Bachelor of Science in marketing. He moved to Lakeville, Minnesota, in 2001.

== Minnesota House of Representatives ==
Koznick was elected to the Minnesota House of Representatives in 2014 and has been reelected every two years since. He first ran after eight-term Republican incumbent Mary Liz Holberg announced she would not seek reelection. When elected, he was one of the first two Latino Republicans to serve in the Minnesota Legislature, along with Eric Lucero. In the 2016 Republican presidential primary, Koznick joined two dozen state lawmakers in endorsing Marco Rubio. He supported Tim Pawlenty during his 2018 Republican gubernatorial primary campaign.

Koznick serves as the minority lead on the Economic Development Finance and Policy Committee and sits on the State and Local Government Finance and Policy and Taxes Committees. From 2019 to 2020 he served as an assistant minority leader for the House Republican Caucus.

=== Transportation ===
Koznick has opposed legislation to raise the state's gas tax. He sponsored legislation that would disband the Counties Transit Improvement Board, a public body that pools resources to pay for transit lines, a proposal Governor Mark Dayton opposed. Koznick authored a bill that would close the Northstar Commuter Rail line, which runs from Big Lake to Minneapolis, citing low ridership numbers. He opposed funding for predevelopment of a land bridge over the I-94 highway in Saint Paul.

Koznick signed on to a letter calling for reforms to the Metropolitan Council, a regional planning agency, and criticizing its handling of the Southwest light rail project. He served on a committee on the Metropolitan Council's Structure and Service, and called for more accountability for the council. He briefly served as chair of the Legislative Commission on Metropolitan Government, and later resigned after a procedural fight between the commission's DFL and Republican members.

Koznick opposed reducing penalties for fare evasions in the Metro Transit system, and authored a bill to establish a rider code of conduct and increase police presence on transit. He also worked on bipartisan legislation to create transit ambassadors, and favored increased monitoring of trains and stations.

=== Other political positions ===
Koznick has co-sponsored legislation to toughen enforcement of gun laws. He coauthored legislation attempting to recruit more teachers of color into Minnesota schools, as well as a bill that would propose a constitutional amendment to establish a fundamental right to quality public education in the state. Koznick opposed the creation of a fifth income tier on the highest earners in Minnesota, saying it would lead businesses to leave the state.

In 2020, while serving as an assistant majority leader, Koznick accidentally sent an email to all representatives, instead of only Republican members, telling his colleagues, "Stay on message if you speak today, COVID issues are not our winning message. PUBLIC SAFETY is our ticket to the majority, let’s win with that".

Koznick supported Governor Tim Walz's proposal to increase small business assistance, but opposed Walz's calls for statewide paid leave. He has supported increasing funding to the International Institute of Minnesota, a nonprofit that provides job training and English classes to new immigrants and refugees. He sponsored legislation that would pay to improve the Lakeville Airlake Industrial Park to allow it to store unused rail cars.

==== Liquor laws ====
Koznick has supported so-called "growler laws" to allow breweries to sell cans and to-go growlers from brewery taprooms and restaurants. He has also authored legislation to allow convenience stores to sell full-strength beer, instead of the 3.2 percent limit in current state law. During the COVID-19 pandemic, Koznick sponsored legislation to allow restaurants to sell beer and wine with takeout orders, but opposed extending the provision to cover cocktails and spirits.

== Electoral history ==
2014 Minnesota State House - District 58A
Party	Candidate	Votes	%
Republican	Jon Koznick	8,021	55.28
Democratic (DFL)	Amy Willingham	6,476	44.63
Write-in		12	0.08
Total votes		14,509	100.0
Republican hold			

2016 Minnesota State House - District 58A
Party	Candidate	Votes	%
Republican	Jon Koznick (incumbent)	13,691	60.65
Democratic (DFL)	LeAnn Weikle	8,852	39.22
Write-in		29	0.13
Total votes		22,572	100.0
Republican hold			

2018 Minnesota State House - District 58A
Party	Candidate	Votes	%
Republican	Jon Koznick (incumbent)	11,769	55.68
Democratic (DFL)	Maggie Williams	9,354	44.25
Write-in		15	0.07
Total votes		21,138	100.0
Republican hold			

2020 Minnesota State House - District 58A
Party	Candidate	Votes	%
Republican	Jon Koznick (incumbent)	15,597	56.16
Democratic (DFL)	Erin Preese	12,155	43.77
Write-in		21	0.08
Total votes		27,773	100.0
Republican hold			

2022 Minnesota State House - District 57A
Party	Candidate	Votes	%
Republican	Jon Koznick (incumbent)	13,039	62.53
Democratic (DFL)	Greg Henningsen	7,792	37.36
Write-in		23	0.11
Total votes		20,854	100.0
Republican hold			

2024 Minnesota State House - District 57A
Party	Candidate	Votes	%
Republican	Jon Koznick (incumbent)	16,479	62.55
Democratic (DFL)	Veda Kanitz	9,848	37.38
Write-in		18	0.07
Total votes		26,345	100.00
Republican hold			

== Personal life ==
Koznick is married to his wife, Patty. They have two children and reside in Lakeville, Minnesota.
