= St. Cloud Metropolitan Transit Commission =

Public transit operator in St. Cloud, Minnesota, US

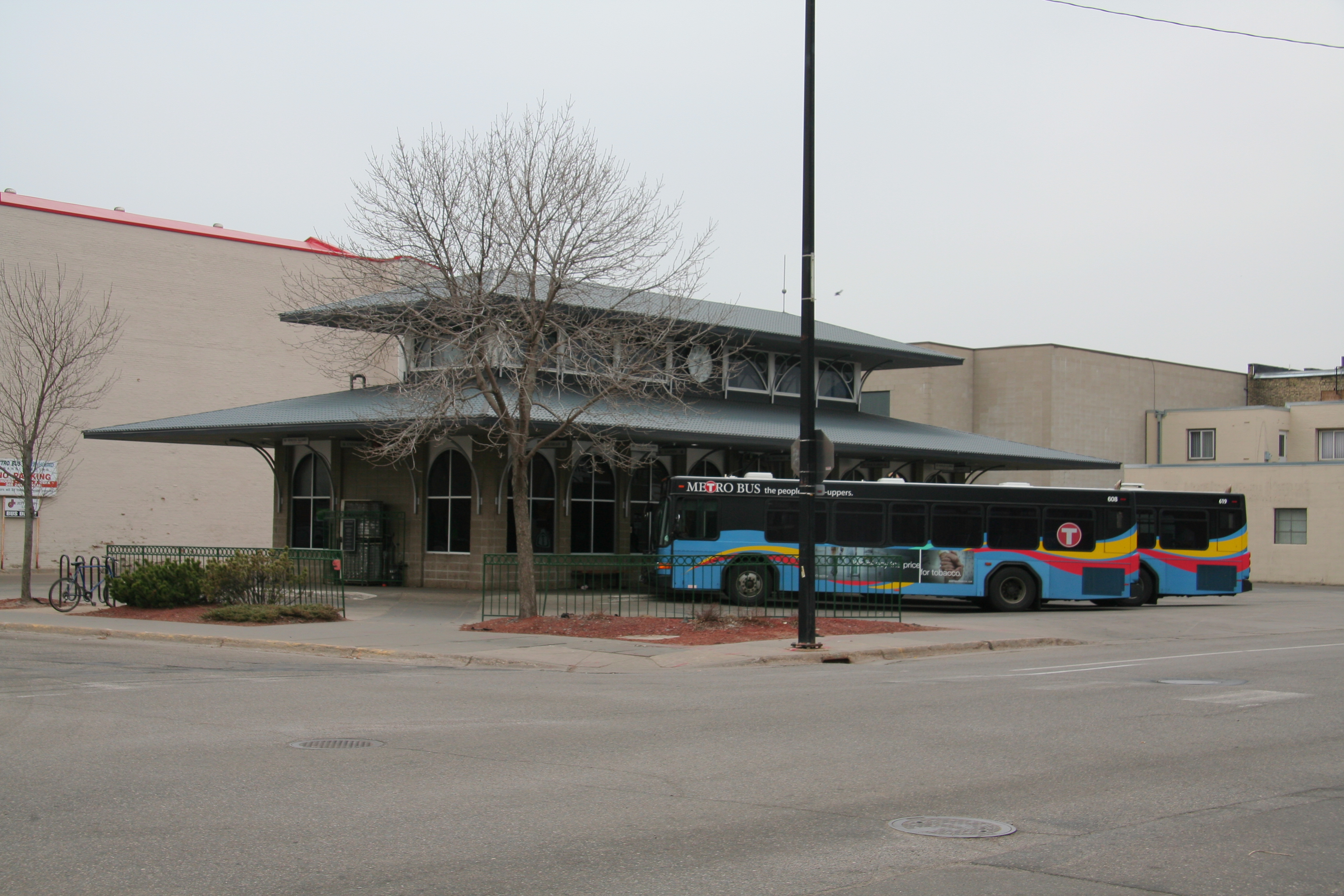
- Founded: 1969
- Headquarters: 665 Franklin Avenue NE
- Locale: St. Cloud, Minnesota
- Service area: St. Cloud, Minnesota, Sartell, Minnesota, Sauk Rapids, Minnesota and Waite Park, Minnesota
- Service type: Fixed Route, Paratransit and Commuter
- Routes: 16
- Fleet: 79
- Daily ridership: 2,600 (weekdays, Q2 2025)
- Annual ridership: 811,800 (2024)
- Fuel type: Diesel and CNG
- Website: ridemetrobus.com

The St. Cloud Metropolitan Transit Commission, branded as Metro Bus, is the primary provider of mass transportation in St. Cloud, Minnesota. Metro Bus service is provided daily using a fleet of 38 full-sized buses and 36 minibuses. Metro Bus also provides service from St. Cloud to the Metro Transit Northstar Commuter Rail station in Big Lake, MN through the Northstar Link Commuter Bus. The agency was formed in 1969 after the private St. Cloud Bus Lines began to cut routes and increase fares, leading the Minnesota State Legislature to establish a Transit Authority to make up for perceived inadequate service.

Sixteen total fixed routes are available in the Metro Bus service area, providing access to the community via approximately 700 bus stops with paratransit service available within a 3/4 mile of all Fixed Routes. The Metro Bus service area includes the cities of St. Cloud, Sartell, Sauk Rapids, and Waite Park, MN. In 2024, the system had a ridership of 811,800, or about 2,600 per weekday as of the second quarter of 2025.

== Regular routes ==
Most of these routes operate in loops originating at the downtown transit center at the corner of 1st Street South and 5th Avenue South. On weekdays, most routes run every hour. On weekends, some routes run every half hour during peak times.

- Route 1: Serves neighborhoods west of downtown, Midtown Square Mall, Crossroads Center, Waite Park, north St. Cloud, St. Cloud Technical and Community College, and the St. Cloud Hospital in a large clockwise loop.
- Route 2: Same destinations as Route 1, but in the opposite direction (counter-clockwise).
- Route 3: Serves neighborhoods west of downtown, major shopping/retail outlets in west St. Cloud and Waite Park, Crossroads Center, and neighborhoods/apartments in Waite Park.
- Route 4: Serves neighborhoods/apartments in north St. Cloud
- Route 5: Serves SCSU, neighborhoods/apartments in south St. Cloud, Waite Park, and Crossroads Center,.
- Route 6: Serves neighborhoods, apartments, and shopping/retail outlets in east St Cloud in a counter-clockwise loop.
- Route 8: Serves SCSU and neighborhoods/apartments in extreme southeast St. Cloud.
- Route 9: Serves neighborhoods/apartments in southeast St. Cloud.
- Route 10: Serves neighborhoods and industrial areas in northwest St. Cloud. Departs from McLeland Rd/Encore Capital Gr and does not run on Sundays.
- Route 11: Serves SCSU and neighborhoods/apartments southwest of campus.
- Route 12: Serves SCSU, neighborhoods south of campus, as well as areas along Route 75 down to I-94.
- Route 21: Departs from downtown St. Cloud and makes a counter-clockwise loop around Sauk Rapids and Sartell east of the river. Does not run on weekends.
- Route 22: Departs from downtown St. Cloud and makes a clockwise loop around Sauk Rapids and Sartell east of the river.
- Route 31: Connects downtown St. Cloud to Sartell via the Sartell Walmart.
- Route 32: Makes a large loop around Sartell, departing from the Sartell Walmart.
- Route 33: Connects Crossroads Center to Sauk Rapids via the Sauk Rapids Coborn's.

== Northstar Link ==
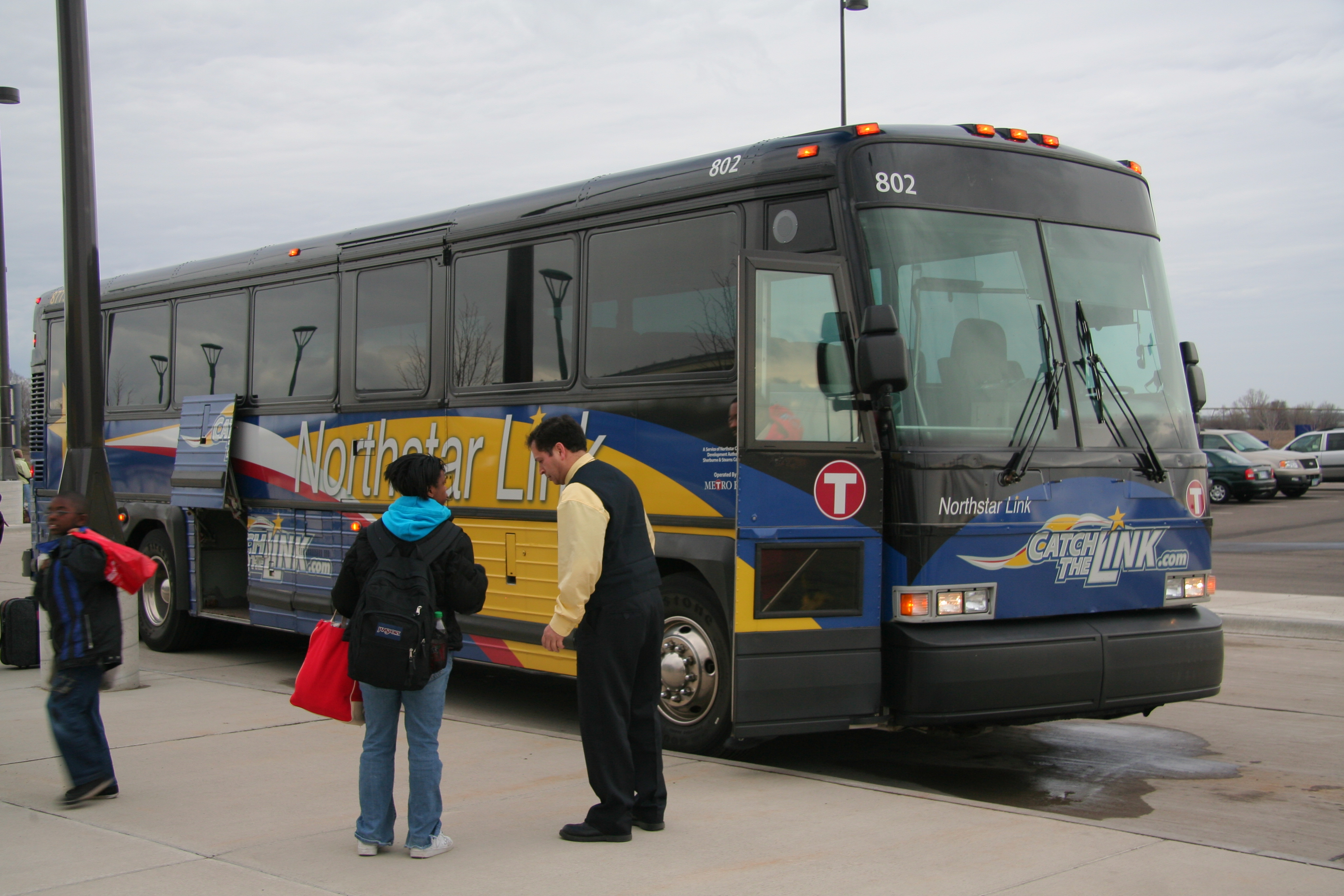
Northstar Link bus at Big Lake station

The Northstar Link (route 887) is a weekday commuter bus route connecting St. Cloud to Metro Transit's Big Lake station which is currently the northernmost stop on the Northstar Line commuter rail service which opened in 2009. There are 5 full-size buses in the Northstar Link fleet. The Northstar Link travels from the downtown St. Cloud Metro Bus Transit Center to the Big Lake, MN Northstar Rail Station with three stops at the St. Cloud State Miller Center, the East St. Cloud Park & Ride and the Park & Ride in Becker, MN.

== Fixed route ridership ==
The ridership statistics shown here are of fixed route services only and do not include demand response services.

== See also ==
- List of bus transit systems in the United States
- Northstar Line
- Metro Transit (Minnesota)
