= Elk River station =

Former commuter rail station in Elk River, Minnesota

Elk River
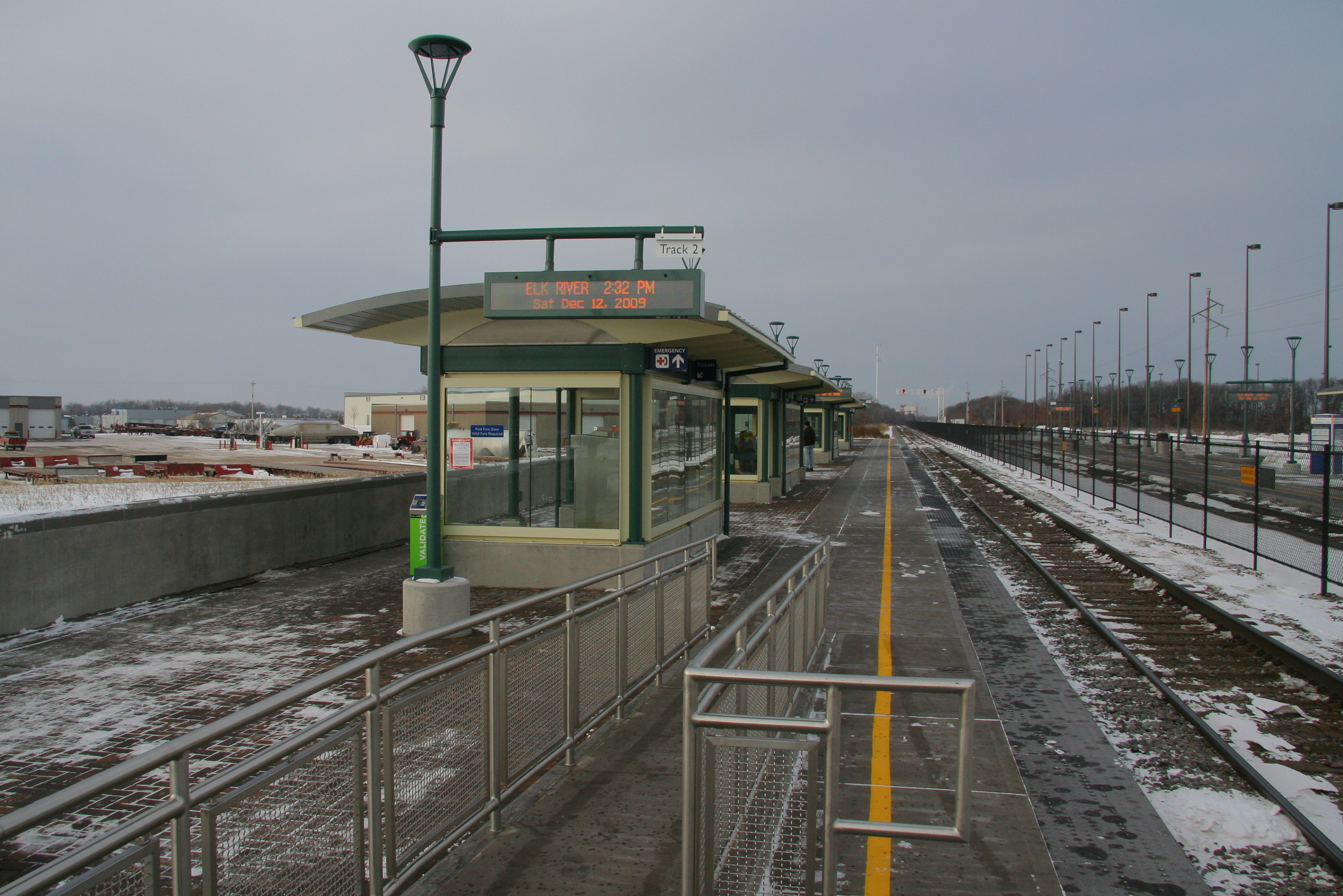
- Elk River station platform

General information
- Location: 17200 Twin Lakes Road; Elk River, Minnesota
- Coordinates: 45°16′58″N 93°32′33″W
- Line: BNSF Staples Subdivision
- Platforms: 2 side platforms
- Tracks: 2

Construction
- Parking: 754 spaces
- Cycle facilities: 6 lockers
- Accessible: Yes

History
- Opened: November 16, 2009
- Closed: January 4, 2026
Former services
Preceding station	Metro Transit	Following station
Big Lake Terminus	Northstar Line	Ramsey toward Target Field
Preceding station	Great Northern Railway	Following station
Big Lake toward Milaca	Milaca – Minneapolis	Ramsey toward Minneapolis
Track layout
Location

Elk River station was a commuter rail station in Elk River, Minnesota, located at 17200 Twin Lakes Road. It was served by the Northstar Line. The station features bicycle lockers and a park and ride lot with capacity for 754 vehicles. The commute time to downtown Minneapolis from this station was about 41 minutes. The normal fare to downtown Minneapolis from this station was $4.50 on weekdays and $4.00 on weekends and holidays; the fare to and from any other station is $3.00 on weekdays and $2.50 on weekends and holidays.
