= Big Lake, Minnesota =

Big Lake
- City
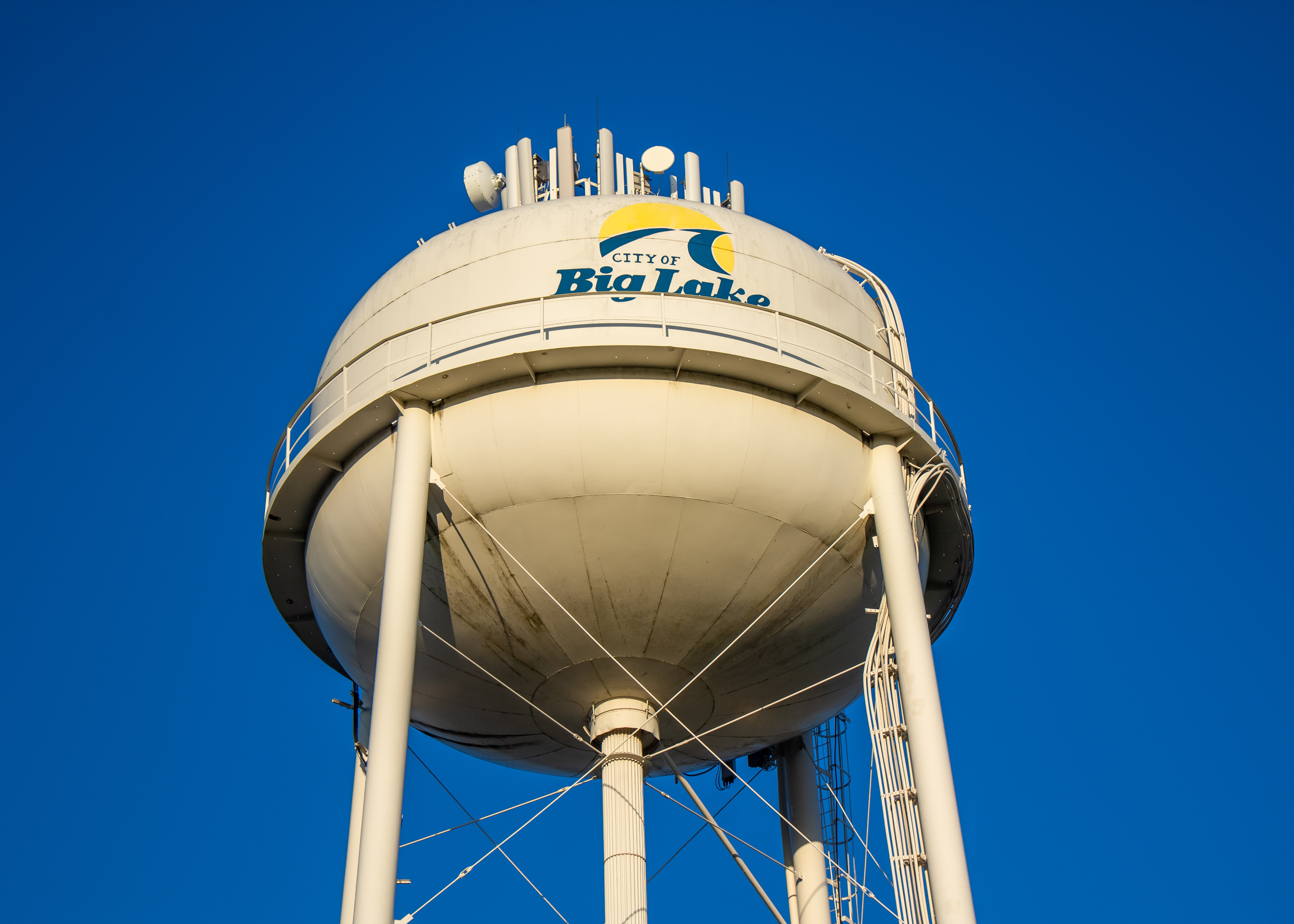
- Big Lake's central water tower at Lakeside Park

- Location of the city of Big Lake within Sherburne County, Minnesota

- Location within Minnesota Location within the United States
- Coordinates: 45°20′40″N 93°45′10″W
- Country: United States
- State: Minnesota
- County: Sherburne

Area
  - Total: 2.92 sq mi (7.55 km^{2})
  - Land: 2.12 sq mi (5.48 km^{2})
  - Water: 0.80 sq mi (2.07 km^{2})
- Elevation: 938 ft (286 m)

Population (2020)
  - Total: 11,686
  - Density: 219.4/sq mi (84.71/km^{2})
- Time zone: UTC-6 (Central (CST))
  - Summer (DST): UTC-5 (CDT)
- ZIP code: 55309
- Area code: 763
- FIPS code: 27-05744
- GNIS feature ID: 0640098
- Website: www.biglakemn.org

Big Lake is a city in Sherburne County, Minnesota, United States. The population was 11,686 at the 2020 census.

== Geography ==
According to the United States Census Bureau, the city has a total area of 2.92 square miles (7.56 km^{2}); 2.11 square miles (5.46 km^{2}) is land and 0.81 square miles (2.10 km^{2}) is water. A portion of the city lies along the Elk River.

Located about forty-one miles northwest of the Twin Cities, Big Lake was once a popular location for escapes from the city, its lakes dotted with summer cabins. Now it is considered an exurb of the metro area, with a significant portion of residents commuting into the Cities daily.

The lake for which the town is named was once an important part of the Twin Cities economy, as in the days before modern refrigerators, much of the ice for metropolitan iceboxes was harvested from Big Lake.

There is a connection to Mitchell Lake by a small channel on the north side of Big Lake.

Big Lake station was the northernmost terminus of the Northstar Commuter Rail line connecting the northwest suburbs and downtown Minneapolis. The line was replaced with bus service in January 2026.

== Demographics ==
Historical population
| Census | Pop. | Note | %± |
|---|---|---|---|
| 1900 | 177 | | — |
| 1910 | 229 | | 29.4% |
| 1920 | 361 | | 57.6% |
| 1930 | 417 | | 15.5% |
| 1940 | 442 | | 6.0% |
| 1950 | 480 | | 8.6% |
| 1960 | 610 | | 27.1% |
| 1970 | 1,015 | | 66.4% |
| 1980 | 2,210 | | 117.7% |
| 1990 | 3,113 | | 40.9% |
| 2000 | 6,063 | | 94.8% |
| 2010 | 10,060 | | 65.9% |
| 2020 | 11,686 | | 16.2% |
U.S. Decennial Census

The median house/condo value in 2005 was estimated to be $207,400 (67% increase from 2000).

=== 2020 census ===
As of the 2020 census, Big Lake had a population of 11,686. The median age was 32.7 years. 28.9% of residents were under the age of 18 and 8.5% of residents were 65 years of age or older. For every 100 females there were 102.9 males, and for every 100 females age 18 and over there were 103.3 males age 18 and over.

98.1% of residents lived in urban areas, while 1.9% lived in rural areas.

There were 4,016 households in Big Lake, of which 42.5% had children under the age of 18 living in them. Of all households, 54.3% were married-couple households, 17.0% were households with a male householder and no spouse or partner present, and 17.7% were households with a female householder and no spouse or partner present. About 19.0% of all households were made up of individuals and 5.7% had someone living alone who was 65 years of age or older.

There were 4,209 housing units, of which 4.6% were vacant. The homeowner vacancy rate was 1.6% and the rental vacancy rate was 5.9%.

Racial composition as of the 2020 census
| Race | Number | Percent |
|---|---|---|
| White | 9,865 | 84.4% |
| Black or African American | 412 | 3.5% |
| American Indian and Alaska Native | 63 | 0.5% |
| Asian | 232 | 2.0% |
| Native Hawaiian and Other Pacific Islander | 0 | 0.0% |
| Some other race | 313 | 2.7% |
| Two or more races | 801 | 6.9% |
| Hispanic or Latino (of any race) | 596 | 5.1% |

=== 2010 census ===
As of the census of 2010, there were 10,060 people, 3,377 households, and 2,500 families living in the city. The population density was 4,767.8 inhabitants per square mile (1,840.9/km^{2}). There were 3,640 housing units at an average density of 1,725.1 per square mile (666.1/km^{2}). The racial makeup of the city was 92.4% White, 1.7% African American, 0.4% Native American, 1.2% Asian, 1.6% from other races, and 2.6% from two or more races. Hispanic or Latino of any race were 3.7% of the population.

There were 3,377 households, of which 50.1% had children under the age of 18 living with them, 56.4% were married couples living together, 10.3% had a female householder with no husband present, 7.3% had a male householder with no wife present, and 26.0% were non-families. 18.6% of all households were made up of individuals, and 4.6% had someone living alone who was 65 years of age or older. The average household size was 2.97 and the average family size was 3.38.

The median age in the city was 29.5 years. 34.3% of residents were under the age of 18; 7.6% were between the ages of 18 and 24; 35.7% were from 25 to 44; 17.1% were from 45 to 64; and 5.3% were 65 years of age or older. The gender makeup of the city was 50.4% male and 49.6% female.

2013 Estimated Population is 10,298

=== 2000 census ===
As of the census of 2000, there were 6,063 people, 2,117 households, and 1,570 families living in the city. The population density was 1,688.4 inhabitants per square mile (651.9/km^{2}). There were 2,206 housing units at an average density of 614.3 per square mile (237.2/km^{2}). The racial makeup of the city was 96.70% White, 0.13% African American, 0.49% Native American, 0.43% Asian, 0.02% Pacific Islander, 0.89% from other races, and 1.34% from two or more races. Hispanic or Latino of any race were 1.80% of the population. 38.6% were of German, 15.2% Norwegian, 7.5% Irish, 7.5% Swedish and 5.9% Polish ancestry.

There were 2,117 households, out of which 44.6% had children under the age of 18 living with them, 58.1% were married couples living together, 9.9% had a female householder with no husband present, and 25.8% were non-families. 17.4% of all households were made up of individuals, and 4.5% had someone living alone who was 65 years of age or older. The average household size was 2.86 and the average family size was 3.23.

In the city, the population was spread out, with 32.5% under the age of 18, 9.8% from 18 to 24, 37.3% from 25 to 44, 14.8% from 45 to 64, and 5.6% who were 65 years of age or older. The median age was 29 years. For every 100 females, there were 101.4 males. For every 100 females age 18 and over, there were 101.2 males.

The median income for a household in the city was $50,658, and the median income for a family was $54,038. Males had a median income of $35,279 versus $26,601 for females. The per capita income for the city was $18,931. About 3.5% of families and 4.7% of the population were below the poverty line, including 5.2% of those under age 18 and 8.1% of those age 65 or over.

== History ==
Big Lake was originally called Humboldt until 1867.

Big Lake was originally established to harvest ice in both of its towns' lakes (Big and Mitchell Lakes). Due to the rich amount of ice Big Lake provided, it needed to be transported quickly, enabling Big Lake to be suitable for a railway station which was built in 1871. Big Lake was served by both the Great Northern Railway and Northern Pacific Railroad, later Burlington Northern Railroad, now BNSF Railway.

The city was host to a station of both GN and NP railways until the NP station burned in 1918, in later years both railroads shared a depot. The depot no longer stands.

== Culture ==
Big Lake is known locally for its annual summer festival "Spud Fest," which celebrates all things potato-related. The festival is also known for its large softball tournament, attracting teams from all over the state.

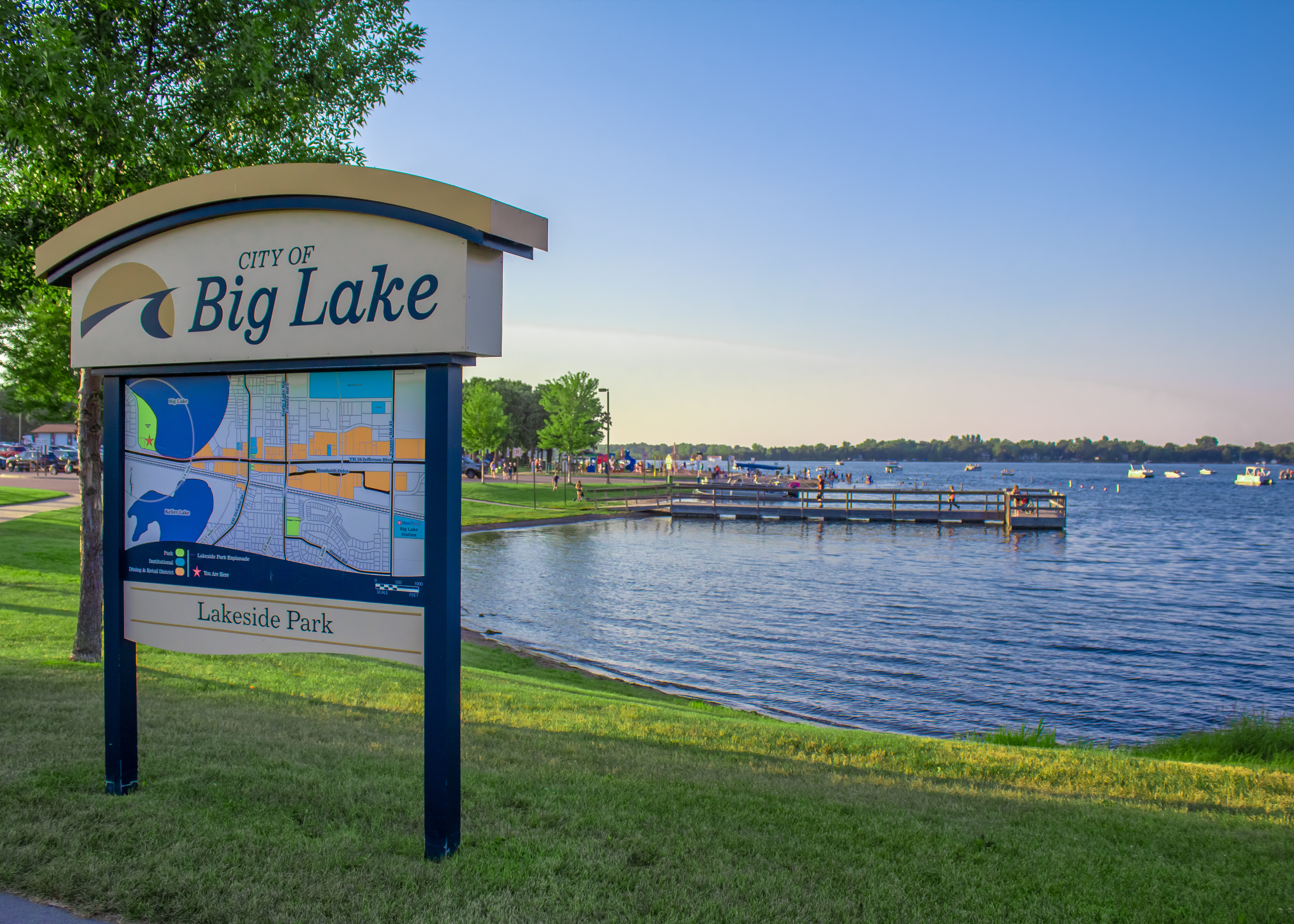
Lakeside Park in Big Lake

Big Lake is also home to the area famous ice auger company, Strike Master.

The local newspaper is the Patriot Newspaper

The local youth baseball league is the Big Lake Baseball Association.

Big Lake is also host to the largest youth football tournament in the Upper Midwest.

== Transportation ==
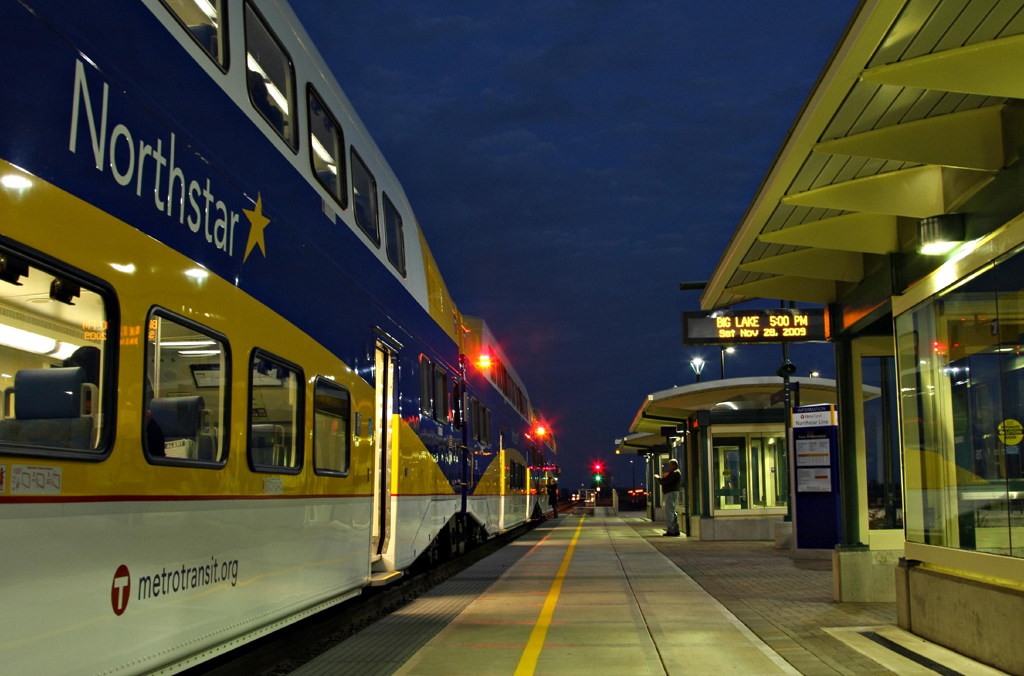
Big Lake station was the current terminus of the Northstar Line prior to its closing in 2026.

Amtrak’s Empire Builder, which operates between Seattle/Portland and Chicago, passes through the town on BNSF tracks, but makes no stop. The nearest station is located in St. Cloud, 28 miles (45 km) to the northwest.

The Northstar Line terminated at Big Lake before its closing in 2026.

== Education ==
The city hosts ISD #727, which includes Big Lake High School.
