= Big Lake station =

Former commuter rail station in Big Lake, Minnesota

Big Lake
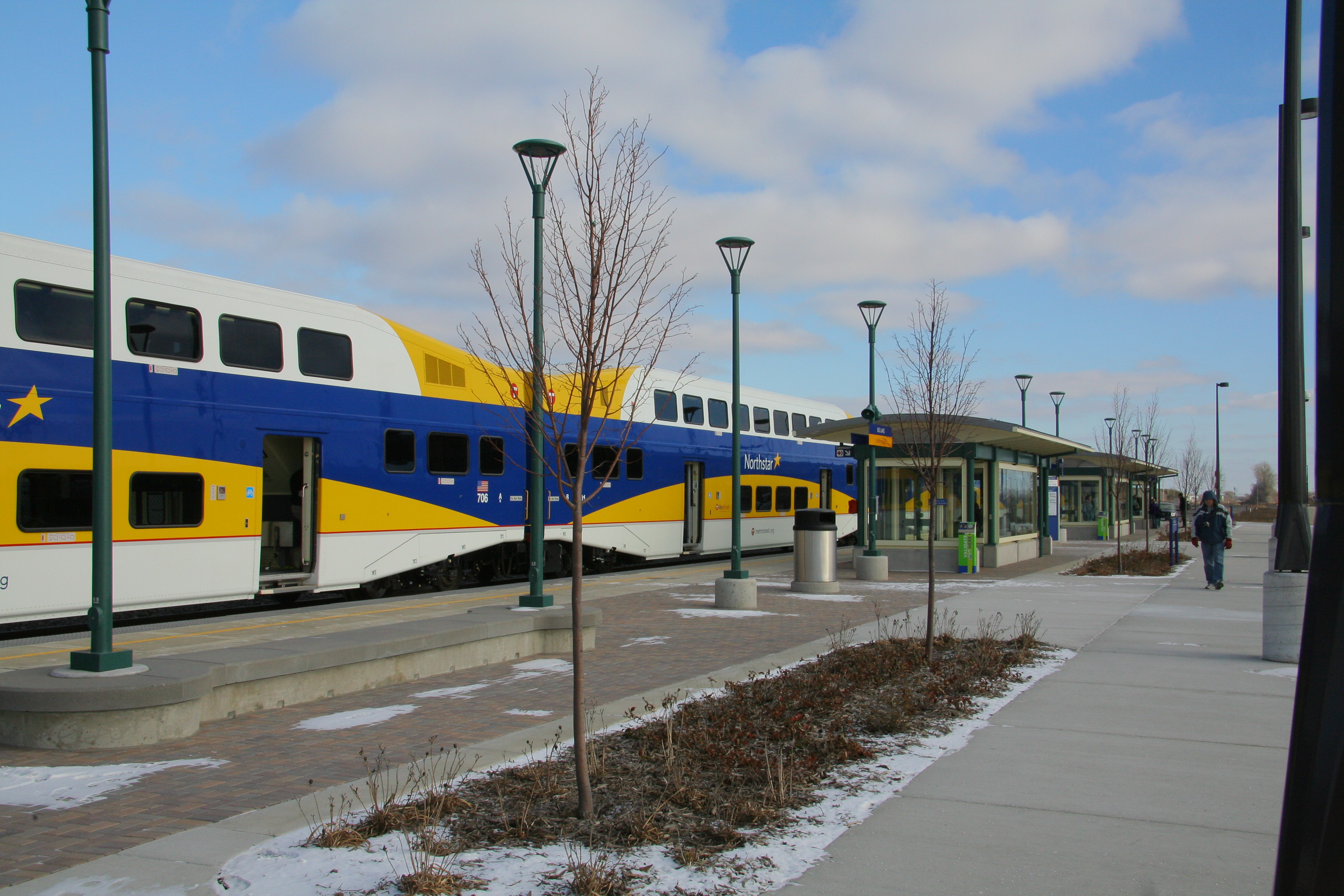
- The single platform at Big Lake station

General information
- Location: 19691 County Road 43; Big Lake, Minnesota
- Coordinates: 45°19′47″N 93°43′48″W
- Line: BNSF Staples Subdivision
- Platforms: 1 side platform
- Tracks: 2 (only 1 in use)
- Connections: Metro Transit: 887 (Northstar Link)

Construction
- Parking: 518 spaces
- Cycle facilities: 6 lockers
- Accessible: Yes

History
- Opened: November 16, 2009
- Closed: January 4, 2026
Former services
Preceding station	Metro Transit	Following station
Terminus	Northstar Line	Elk River toward Target Field
Preceding station	Great Northern Railway	Following station
Becker toward Milaca	Milaca – Minneapolis	Elk River toward Minneapolis
Track layout
Location

Big Lake station was a Northstar Line commuter rail station in Big Lake, Minnesota, located at 19691 County Road 43, in the southeast corner of Big Lake near U.S. Highway 10. The station featured bicycle lockers and a park and ride lot with capacity for 518 vehicles. Commute time to downtown Minneapolis from this station was about 51 minutes.

This station was the northbound terminus of the Northstar Line. A commuter bus branded the Northstar Link (route 887) connected Big Lake with St. Cloud, stopping at the Metro Bus downtown transit center, St. Cloud State University, a commuter parking lot at Lincoln Avenue and U.S. Highway 10 and the Coffee Cup Cafe in Becker. The bus was operated by St. Cloud Metro Bus, rather than Metro Transit.

The maintenance facility for the Northstar trains was built just to the south.
