= Staples Subdivision =

Railway line in Minnesota

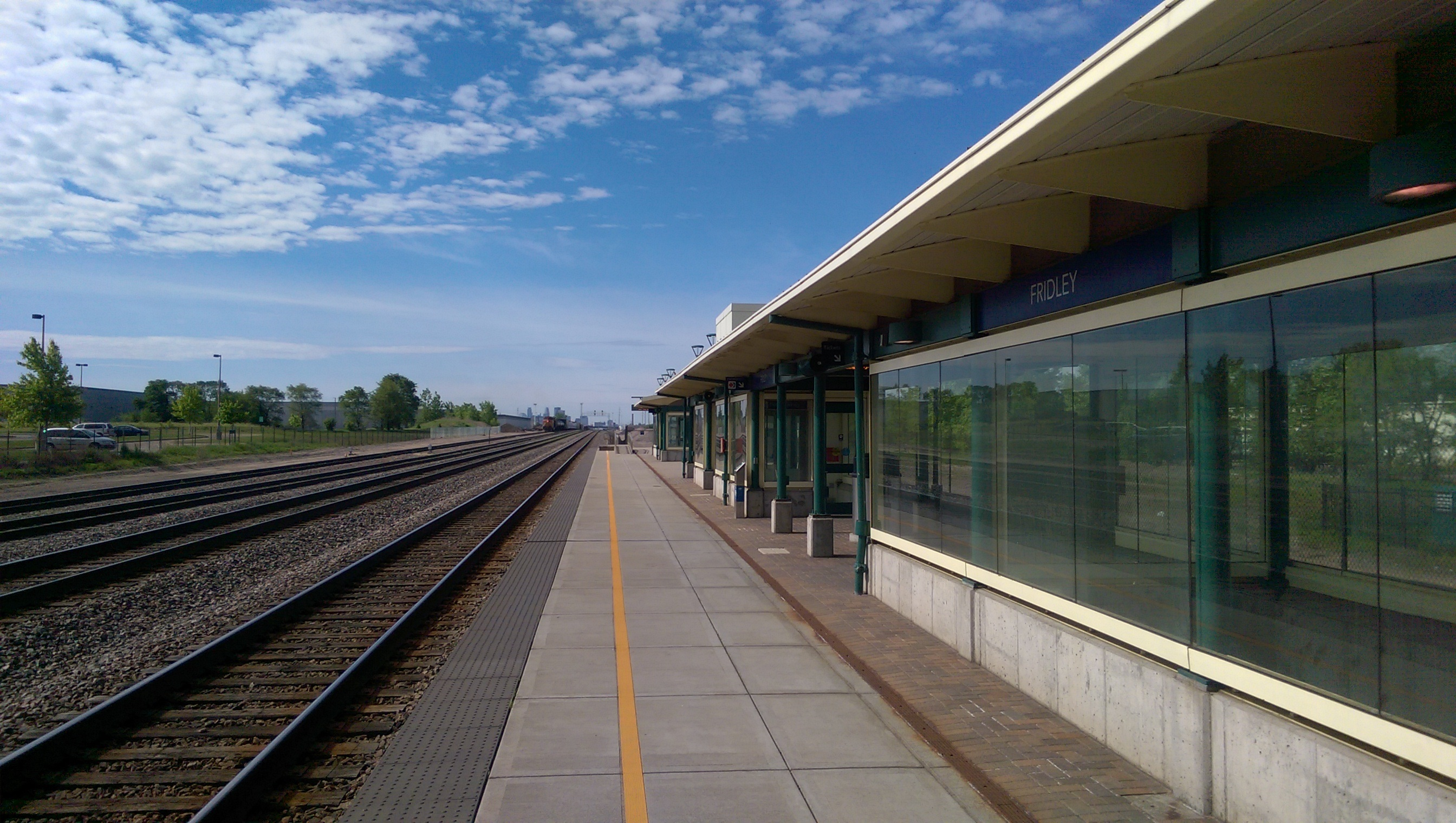
Platform of the Fridley Northstar station looking South towards Minneapolis

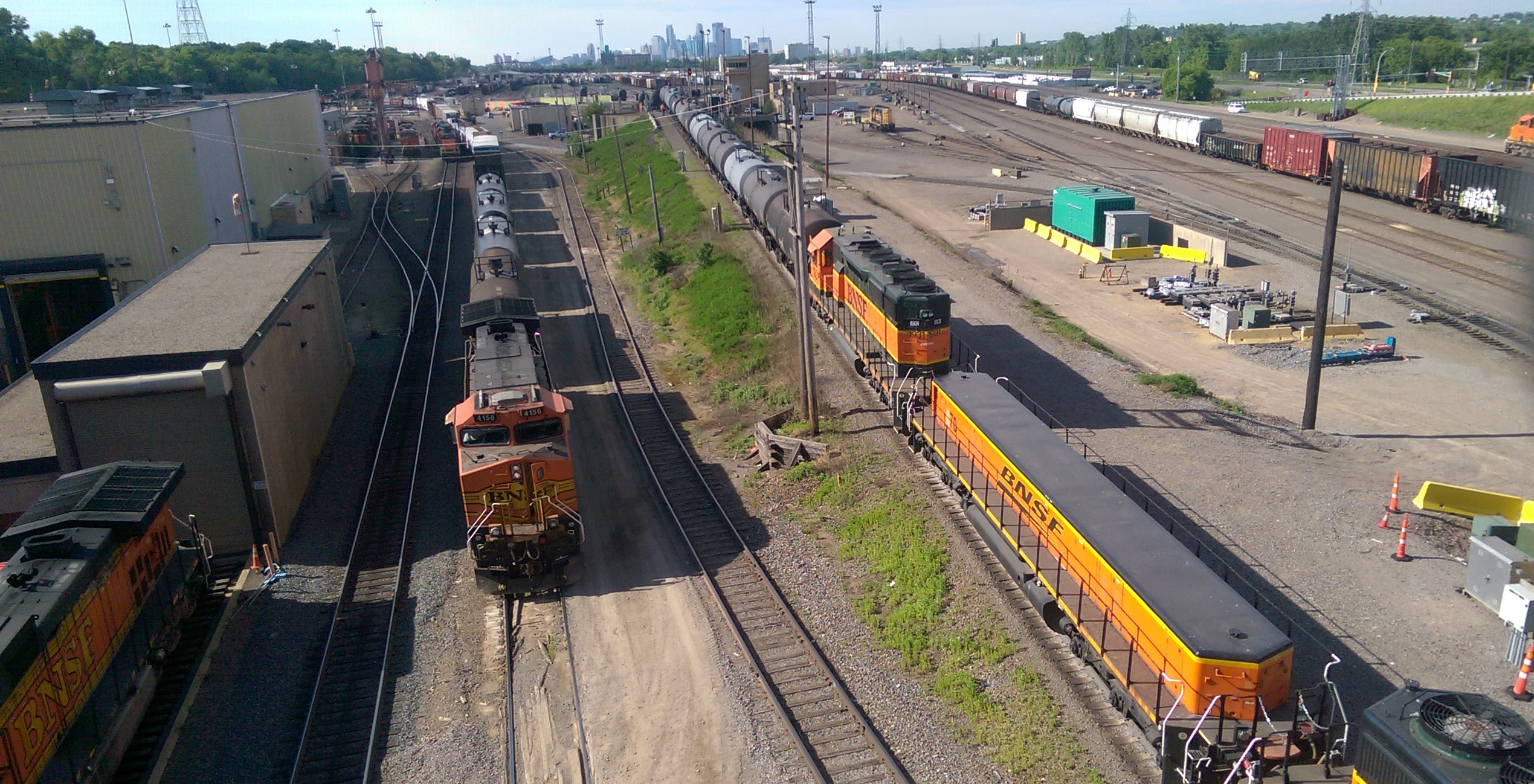
BNSF Northtown Classification Yard (looking South towards Minneapolis)

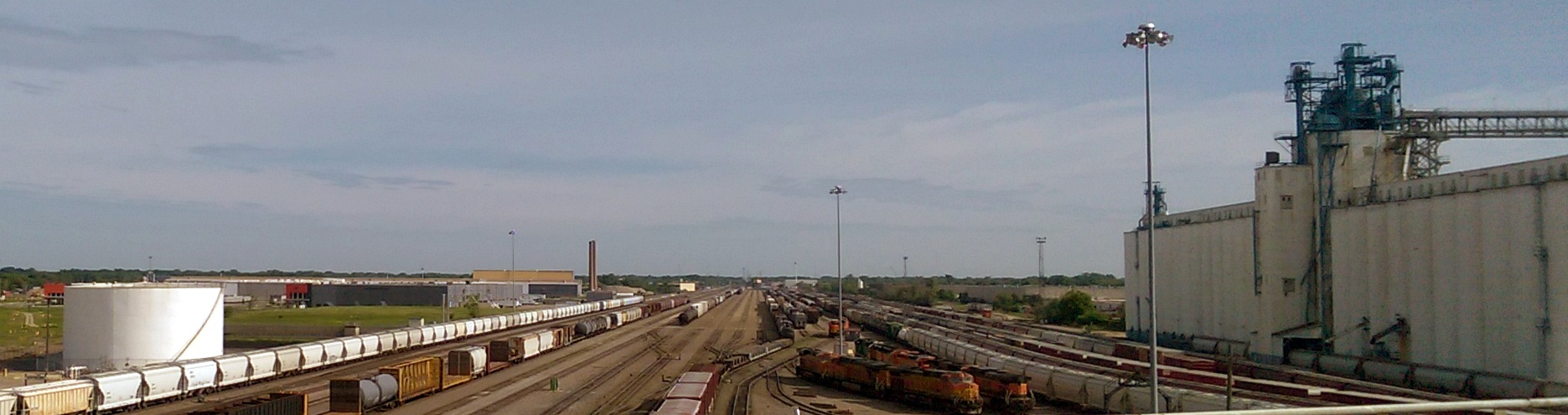
BNSF Northtown Classification Yard (looking North into Fridley)

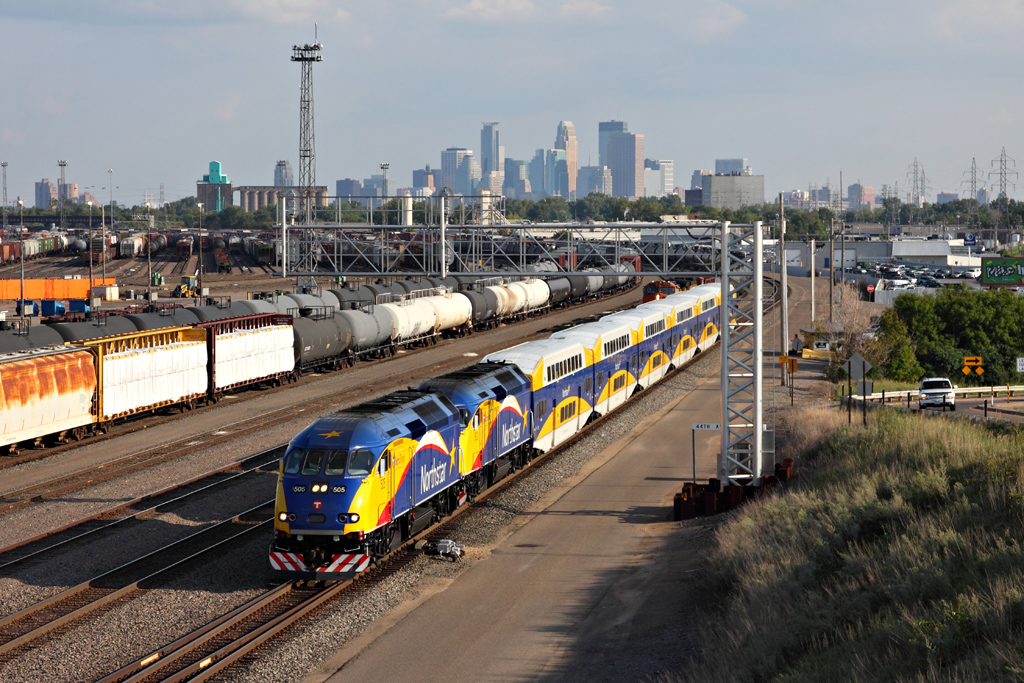
Northstar Commuter Train passing through Northtown yard

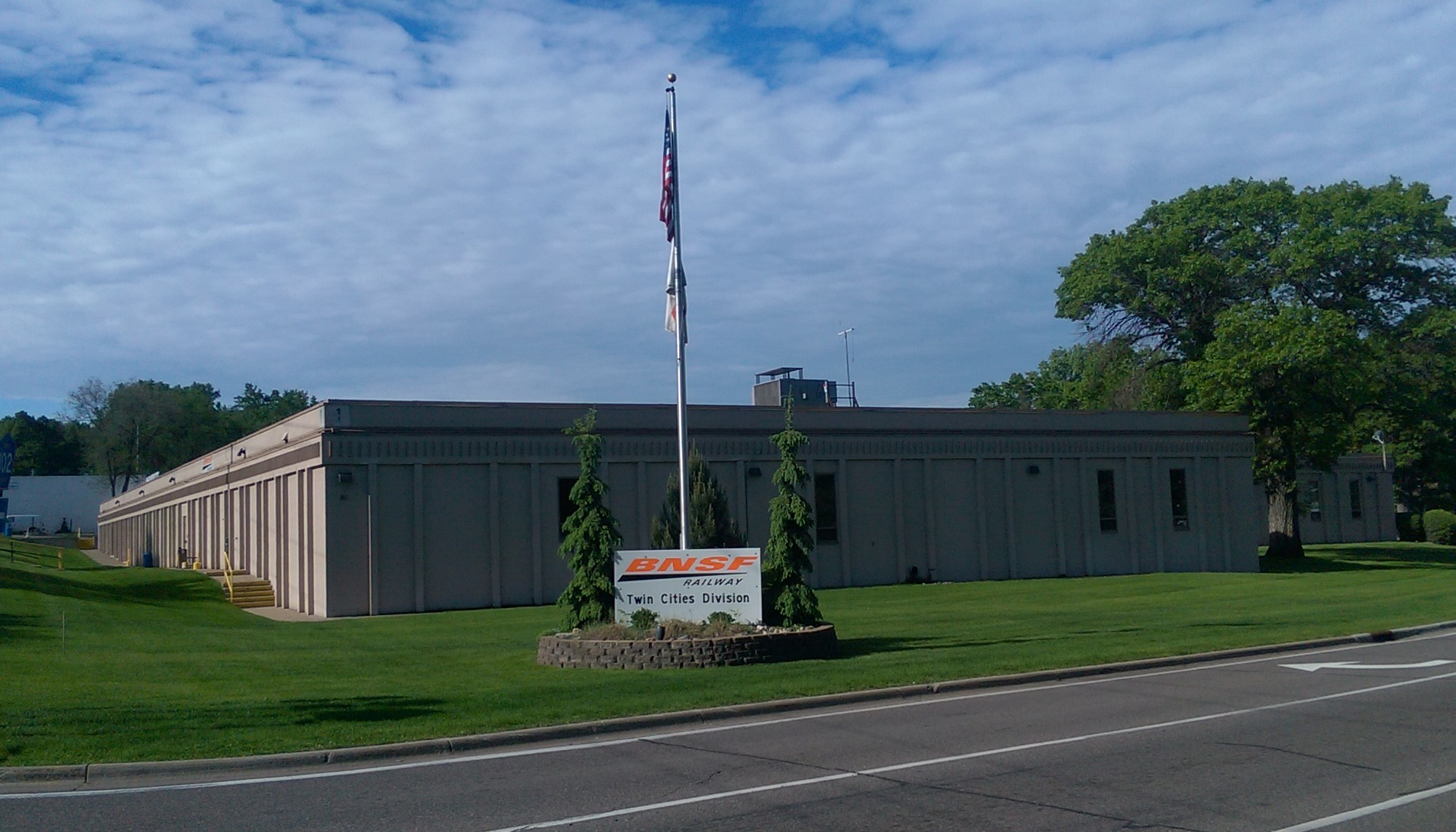
BNSF Twin Cities Division office at Northtown Yards

The Staples Subdivision or Staples Sub is a railway line running about 227 miles (365 km) from Dilworth to Fridley, Minnesota (near Minneapolis). It is operated by BNSF Railway as part of their Northern Transcon and contains the busiest segment of mainline track in the state, the segment between Coon Rapids and Fridley. As of 2015, most of the route hosted an average of 60 trains per day, and there were 80 trains per day near Fridley. As of April 2022, the Staples Sub sees about 30-40 trains a day and it’s starting to rise to be more trains again on the line. The line meets the KO Subdivision in the west at East Dilworth, and runs to Interstate in Fridley, at the limits of Northtown Yard. Beyond Northtown, the rails continue as the Midway Subdivision and St. Paul Subdivision. U.S. Highway 10 closely follows the rail line for a majority of the distance between Dilworth and Fridley, Minnesota.

This subdivision is mostly double track with only 2 segments of single track. An approximately three mile segment of single track exists between Gregory and Little Falls and sees the crossing of the Mississippi River. The second, approximately 25 mile segment of single track, runs between Darling and Philbrook with sidings at Randall and Lincoln. As of March 2016, there are no immediate plans to double track these remaining portions of single track.

This line has hosted Amtrak's Empire Builder since 1979, and the train makes stops along the Staples Subdivision in St. Cloud, Staples, and Detroit Lakes. Between November 16, 2009 and January 4, 2026, it hosted the Northstar Line commuter train, with stops in Fridley, Coon Rapids, Anoka, Ramsey, Elk River, and Northstar's home terminal in Big Lake.

This line also features connections to two subdivisions heading to Duluth, Minnesota. The Brainerd Subdivision breaks off to the east in Staples, while the Hinckley Subdivision runs north from Coon Creek Junction in Coon Rapids. Mileposts are counted from near the Saint Paul Union Depot for the southern half of the line from Fridley to near Staples, but northwest of Staples, distance is measured from Duluth.
