= Northern Lights Express =

Proposed rail service in Minnesota and Wisconsin, United States

Overview
- Service type: Inter-city, higher-speed rail
- Status: Planning
- Locale: Minnesota and Wisconsin, United States
- Predecessor: Arrowhead (1975–1978); North Star (1978–1985)
- First service: To be determined
- Former operator: Amtrak
- Annual ridership: 700,000 annually (projected)
- Website: https://www.dot.state.mn.us/nlx/

Route
- Termini: Target Field Station, Minneapolis; Duluth Depot, Duluth
- Stops: 6 (2 existing, 4 proposed)
- Distance travelled: 152 miles (245 km)
- Average journey time: 2.5 hours
- Service frequency: Four daily round-trips

Technical
- Track gauge: 4 ft 8 1/2 in (1,435 mm) standard gauge
- Operating speed: 60 mph (97 km/h) (avg.); 90 mph (140 km/h) (top)
- Track owners: BNSF, North Shore Scenic Railroad

The Northern Lights Express (NLX) project is a planned higher-speed rail service that would run 155 miles (249 km) between Minneapolis and Duluth primarily in the U.S. state of Minnesota. A portion of the proposed line would run through neighboring Wisconsin to serve Duluth's "Twin Port" of Superior. Plans are to upgrade an existing BNSF Railway freight line to allow trains to travel at up to 90 miles per hour (145 km/h). The train service would provide an alternative to travel along Interstate 35 corridor between Duluth and the Twin Cities.

The proposed service's trains would mostly follow the same route as Amtrak's former North Star, except originating in Minneapolis rather than Saint Paul, and would stop at a suburban station, Foley Boulevard. The proposed line follows part of Amtrak's Empire Builder and Metro Transit's former Northstar Line.

== History ==
The Northern Lights Express would be the first passenger rail service to Duluth since 1986, when Amtrak discontinued the 50-mile-per-hour (80 km/h) North Star. Alternatives analysis and a corridor assessment report were complete as of mid-2010. The line had initially been projected to open as early as 2012, though more recent sources had stated 2013 or 2014 as start dates. As of 2010, the project was entering either an 18-month environmental impact statement (EIS) process or a shorter environmental assessment (EA) review, but it was unclear which path was to be taken. The shorter EA process was strongly advocated by former Rep. James Oberstar, former chairman of the U.S. House Transportation Committee, who represented northern Minnesota.

In 1999, a Twin Cities commuter rail network was designated, overlaying was the tier two Bethel Corridor, running from a downtown Minneapolis station along the former North Star corridor to Cambridge. Another tier two commuter route, the Rush Line, would have connected Hinckley to downtown Saint Paul. In late 2009, Target Field Station was established as the new downtown Minneapolis train station with the first commuter service, the Northstar Line, mostly following the existing Empire Builder to Big Lake. A station at the expansive Foley Boulevard park & ride is considered an infill project for the Northstar Line.

Discussion about the Northern Lights Express dates back at least a decade. A preliminary feasibility study was conducted around the year 2000, followed by a comprehensive feasibility study in 2006–2007. A joint powers board was established in 2007 consisting of the regional rail authorities for counties along the corridor along with representatives from Minneapolis, Duluth, and the Mille Lacs Band of Ojibwe. The name was given to the line in March 2008 by a vote of the corridor's stakeholders.

A feasibility study was completed in late 2007 which evaluated service at speeds of 79 mph (127 km/h), 110 mph (177 km/h), and 125 mph (201 km/h), and service of eight round trips per day at 110 mph (177 km/h) was recommended. The 79 mph (127 km/h) option was discarded because it would not attract enough riders to cover operating costs. NLX supporters hope to receive funds from the Federal Railroad Administration which requires new train projects to show they will operate at a surplus each year, unlike the Federal Transit Administration that funded the Hiawatha and Northstar lines in the Twin Cities. Trains would also operate at a surplus at 125 mph (201 km/h), but higher capital costs and only a modest reduction in travel time made that option look less attractive. The study used the diesel-powered Talgo XXI as a reference, which has poor acceleration above 110 mph (177 km/h).

Planning for the line received a big boost at the end of September 2008 when U.S. Transportation Secretary Mary Peters announced that the federal government would contribute $30 million to passenger rail projects across the country. The contribution included $1.1 million for the Northern Lights Express. On September 9, 2011, Transportation Secretary Ray LaHood announced a grant of $5 million to fund environmental and engineering studies for the project. On March 18, 2013, the environmental assessment was completed and released on the Minnesota Department of Transportation (MnDOT) website.

In 2015 a press conference revealed an updated look at the NLX plan. The train would operate at 90 mph (140 km/h) and use the Siemens Charger locomotive instead of the Talgo. This proposal included six stations served by four daily trains in each direction. Tier 2 studies of the line would continue until 2017. As of June 2019, the project had failed to secure funding. However in February 2020, a proposal was made to grant $40 million in funding for the project.

Early 2022 saw momentum to acquire funding for the line. As part of the proposed 2022 state bonding bill, Governor Tim Walz earmarked $16.1 million for safety, capacity, and infrastructure improvements in the corridor, and if passed would receive a federal match of $80 million. Supporters have pointed out that Northern Lights Express would be eligible for funds appointed to Amtrak–State projects under the Infrastructure Investment and Jobs Act, with Northern Lights Express able to receive priority as a shovel ready project. Representatives Mary Murphy and Liz Olson co-sponsored two bills in the Minnesota House that would allocate $85 million for the project, activating the remaining $320 million from the Department of Transportation. Senator Jerry Newton announced they would sponsor companion bills in the Minnesota Senate.

Following the 2022 MN state elections, the 93rd Minnesota Legislature approved $194.7 million dollars in state funding for the route.

In December 2023, the Federal Railroad Administration accepted an application by MnDOT to enter the Minneapolis–Duluth route into its Corridor Identification and Development Program. The program grants $500,000 toward service planning and prioritizes the route for future federal funding.

== Required track improvements ==
The Northern Lights Express is planned to use several segments of BNSF track. Starting from the south, it would run along the Wayzata Subdivision from Target Field to Minneapolis Junction, the Midway Subdivision to Northtown Yard, and then enter the Staples Subdivision—the same as the former Northstar commuter rail line. The NLX would turn north at Coon Creek Junction in Coon Rapids to enter the Hinckley Subdivision, which it would follow to Boylston Junction between Foxboro and Superior, Wisconsin. From Boylston, the train would use BNSF's Lakes Subdivision to reach Superior. From Superior to Duluth, the train would be on BNSF again, crossing the Grassy Point swing bridge back into Minnesota and then turning northeast to travel along the shore of St. Louis Bay. The train would exit BNSF rails at Rice's Point and would then run along the North Shore Scenic Railroad for a short segment into the Duluth Union Depot.

A preliminary study from around the year 2000 projected a cost of $79 million to purchase rolling stock and upgrade track along the existing line, though this apparently only anticipated 79 miles per hour (127 km/h) service. The cost projection grew to $320 million in 2008, and $615 million in 2009, with a "worst-case scenario" number of $990 million. The latest budget as of 2017 is around $425 million. "Construction costs include final design work, track and signal upgrades to accommodate higher speeds, new and longer sidings to improve traffic flow, grade crossing improvements to increase safety, new train stations, and the expansion of existing stations." Up to 80% of the cost may be covered by the federal government, only requiring 20% from state and local sources. This is comparable to highway projects which often receive 80% or 90% funding from the federal government, and is in contrast to the Hiawatha (Metro Blue Line) light rail and Northstar commuter lines which received 50% matching federal funds.

The wide range of cost estimates relates to how much of the 140-mile (230 km) line between Coon Creek Junction and Duluth would need to be upgraded from the current single-track configuration to a double-track corridor. Running double track all the way to Duluth may bring the cost to $990 million, but the NLX organization has preferred to only run double track north to Sandstone. It was also considered key to upgrade the rails to let trains make the trip in two hours or less. At that pace, the trains could do more than one round trip per day, reducing the number of trainsets needed to provide frequent service. The NLX organization revisited some slower options in 2010, and is now leaning toward Option 2 that would mostly run at 90 mph (140 km/h) north of the Twin Cities, but would support speeds up to 110 mph (180 km/h) between Cambridge and Hinckley. This would significantly reduce the cost and lead to better benefit-cost calculations, but would also reduce the operating margin to barely better than break-even. Option 2 would have trains take 2 hours and 17 minutes to make the trip, and drop the average speed from about 78 mph (126 km/h) to about 68 mph (109 km/h). This still compares favorably with the scheduled 3 hours 35 minutes scheduled for the North Star in 1985—a mere 43 mph (69 km/h) average.

As of 2009, the line hosted 12 to 15 freight trains per day. It had at least some Class 4 track which limits freight to 50 mph (80 km/h) and passenger traffic to 79 mph (127 km/h), but this would need to be upgraded to Class 5 and Class 6 in order to support 90 and 110 mph (140 and 180 km/h) speeds, respectively. There are more than 150 grade crossings and 12 bridges on this segment which would need to be improved (or eliminated, in the case of some grade crossings). The line has automatic block signaling, but needs centralized traffic control and positive train control installed to support speeds above 79 mph (127 km/h). There are also several sidings along the route which only have manual switches and would need to be automated.

The double-track main line south of Coon Creek Junction is the busiest rail corridor in the Twin Cities metropolitan area. In July 2009, before the Northstar commuter line began operation, this segment hosted 63 trains per day. In 2015, BNSF constructed a third main line in the area from the junction south to East Interstate (the bridge over Interstate 694). BNSF would allow 22 more passenger trains per day for Northstar, NLX, Amtrak, and possibly other services. The Northstar's Fridley station was built with the future third main in mind, and was initially built as an island platform with track only on the east side, requiring the Northstar train to be on that track when traveling inbound to or outbound from Minneapolis.

== Stations list ==
Station	City	State	Notes
Duluth Depot	Duluth	Minnesota	Connections with Arrowhead Transit, DTA, and the North Shore Scenic Railroad; Last served by the North Star in 1985
Superior		Wisconsin	Superior bypassed by the North Star in 1984
Hinckley		Minnesota	Connections with Arrowhead Transit public transportation; Ground transportation to Grand Casino to be accommodated; Hinckley last served by Northern Pacific trains in 1967
Cambridge		Minnesota	Connections with Arrowhead Transit public transportation; Station to be integrated into the Cambridge City Center Mall; Cambridge last served by the North Star in 1985
Foley Boulevard	Coon Rapids	Minnesota	Connections with Metro Transit; Minneapolis last served by the Arrowhead in 1978
Target Field Station	Minneapolis	Minnesota	Connections with Metro Transit; Minneapolis last served by the Arrowhead in 1978
Northern Lights Express (source)
