= Sandstone station =

Minnesotan train station (1895-1971)

Sandstone, MN
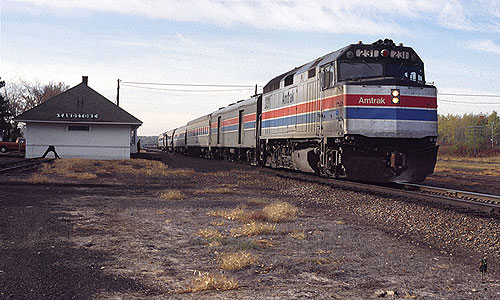
- North Star at Sandstone station in 1979

General information
- Location: 4th Street and Main Street, Sandstone, Minnesota 55072
- Coordinates: 46.132826°N 92.867271°W
- System: Inter-city rail station
- Line: BNSF Hinckley Subdivision
- Platforms: 1 side platform (removed)
- Tracks: 1

History
- Opened: 1895; April 15, 1975 (Amtrak)
- Closed: 1971; April 7, 1985

Former services
Preceding station	Amtrak	Following station
Superior toward Duluth	North Star	Cambridge toward Chicago or Saint Paul–Midway
Superior toward Duluth	Arrowhead	Cambridge toward Minneapolis
Preceding station	Great Northern Railway	Following station
Hinckley toward St. Paul	St. Paul – Duluth	Askov toward Duluth
Location

The Sandstone station of Sandstone, Minnesota was built in 1895 and served the Great Northern Railway and successor Burlington Northern until 1971. Passenger service ceased upon the formation of Amtrak, but resumed between Minneapolis and Superior in 1975. Sandstone was served by the Arrowhead and later the North Star between Chicago and Duluth. Service ceased after April 7, 1985. The depot still exists, but has been relocated from the tracks.
