= Hinckley Subdivision =

Railway line in Minnesota and Wisconsin

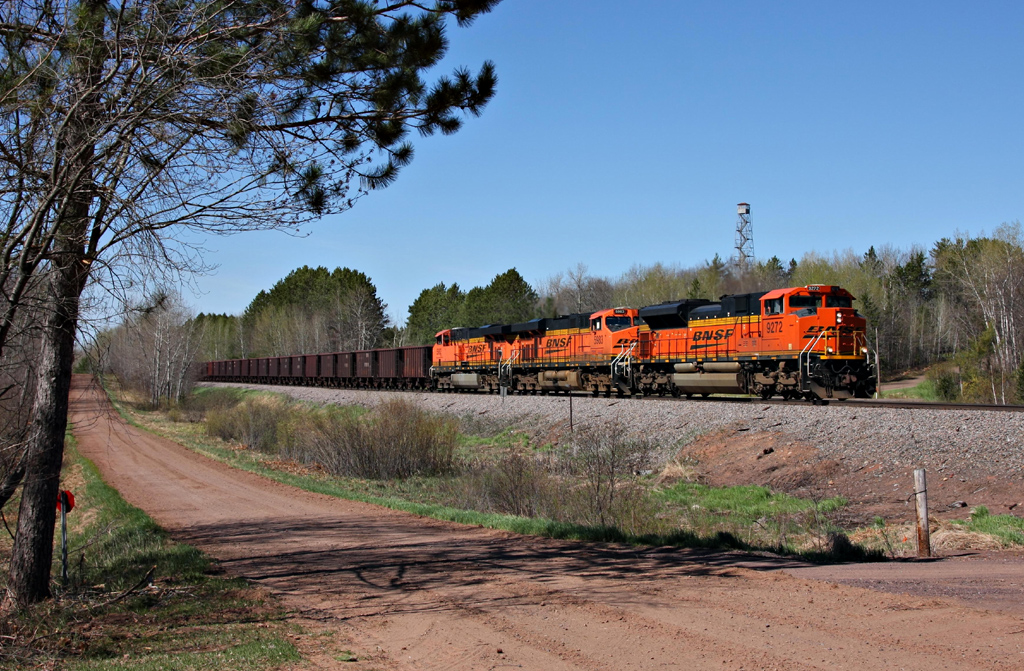
- A BNSF EMD SD70ACe leads an empty taconite train through Nickerson, Minnesota.

Overview
- Owner: BNSF Railway

Service
- Type: Freight rail
- Operator(s): BNSF Railway

Technical
- Line length: 136.9 mi (220.3 km)
- Track gauge: 1,435 mm (4 ft 8 1/2 in) standard gauge
- Operating speed: 50 mph (80 km/h)

The Hinckley Subdivision is a railway line that connects the Twin Cities to the Twin Ports in Minnesota and Wisconsin. Historically Built and owned by the Eastern Minnesota Railway (later by the Great Northern Railway) until 1970 and then the Burlington Northern Railroad until 1995–1996, it is now owned by BNSF Railway. The line branches north from the Staples Subdivision at Coon Creek junction in Coon Rapids, MN, and ends at Boylston junction between Foxboro and Superior, Wisconsin. There, the tracks meet the Lakes Subdivision from north-central Minnesota that bring trains into the Duluth–Superior area.

The Union Pacific and Canadian Pacific Kansas City railroads also have trackage rights on the line and run their own trains along it. Canadian National Railway previously had trackage rights on the line, but now operate trains on the Superior Subdivision line of their subsidiary Wisconsin Central Railway between the Twin Ports area and Stevens Point, Wisconsin.

== Technical details ==
Rail traffic has fluctuated on the line. Around 2012 and 2013, about 14 trains per day used the route. Data from 2019 indicates the line is down to six trains per day. As of January 2023, this line sees around 2 to 5 daily trains. The Hinckley sub mostly sees manifest, grain, coke & taconite trains. It occasionally sees potash and coal trains. The Hinckley Local runs on Mondays, Wednesdays, and sometimes Fridays. It serves industries in Cedar, Cambridge, and Hinckley.

There are nine sidings on the Hinckley Subdivision, located in Andover, Cambridge, Grasston, Brook Park, Hinckley, Askov, Bruno, Nickerson, and Foxboro. The longest sidings are in Andover and Grasston, each with a length of 9,000 feet (1.7 miles)

As of 2009, the Hinckley Subdivision used a combination of track warrant control (TWC) and automatic block signaling (ABS) for managing train movement authorization, which prevents trains from being visible on applications such as ATCS Monitor, although communications can be overheard with radio scanners.

Distances along the line are measured north to south, with Boylston at milepost 11.8 and Coon Creek at milepost 136.9.

== Passenger service ==
There is currently no passenger service on this line. Passenger trains used this route until 1985 when Amtrak's North Star stopped operating. The Northern Lights Express (NLX) between Minneapolis and Duluth is in planning stages, with $195 million appropriated by the Minnesota Legislature in 2023, expected to be the local match for an 20%/80% split between state and federal funding for the service. While the previous train was limited to between 50 and 79 miles per hour (80 and 127 km/h), the Northern Lights Express would run at up to 90 mph (140 km/h). The North Star stopped in Cambridge and Sandstone, and the NLX is expected to stop in Cambridge and Hinckley.

Since the end of regular passenger service in 1985, excursion trains have occasionally run on the Hinckley Subdivision. The Milwaukee Road 261 has operated several times from the late 1990s into the 2010s. A planned excursion in 2018 to raise funds for positive train control support for the locomotive was canceled due to changes in Amtrak policies regarding excursion trains. The Union Pacific Big Boy #4014 also hosted a steam excursion in 2019 that ran on the Hinckley Subdivision up to the Union Depot in Duluth, Minnesota.
