= Superior Union Station =

Rail station in Superior, Wisconsin

Superior, WI
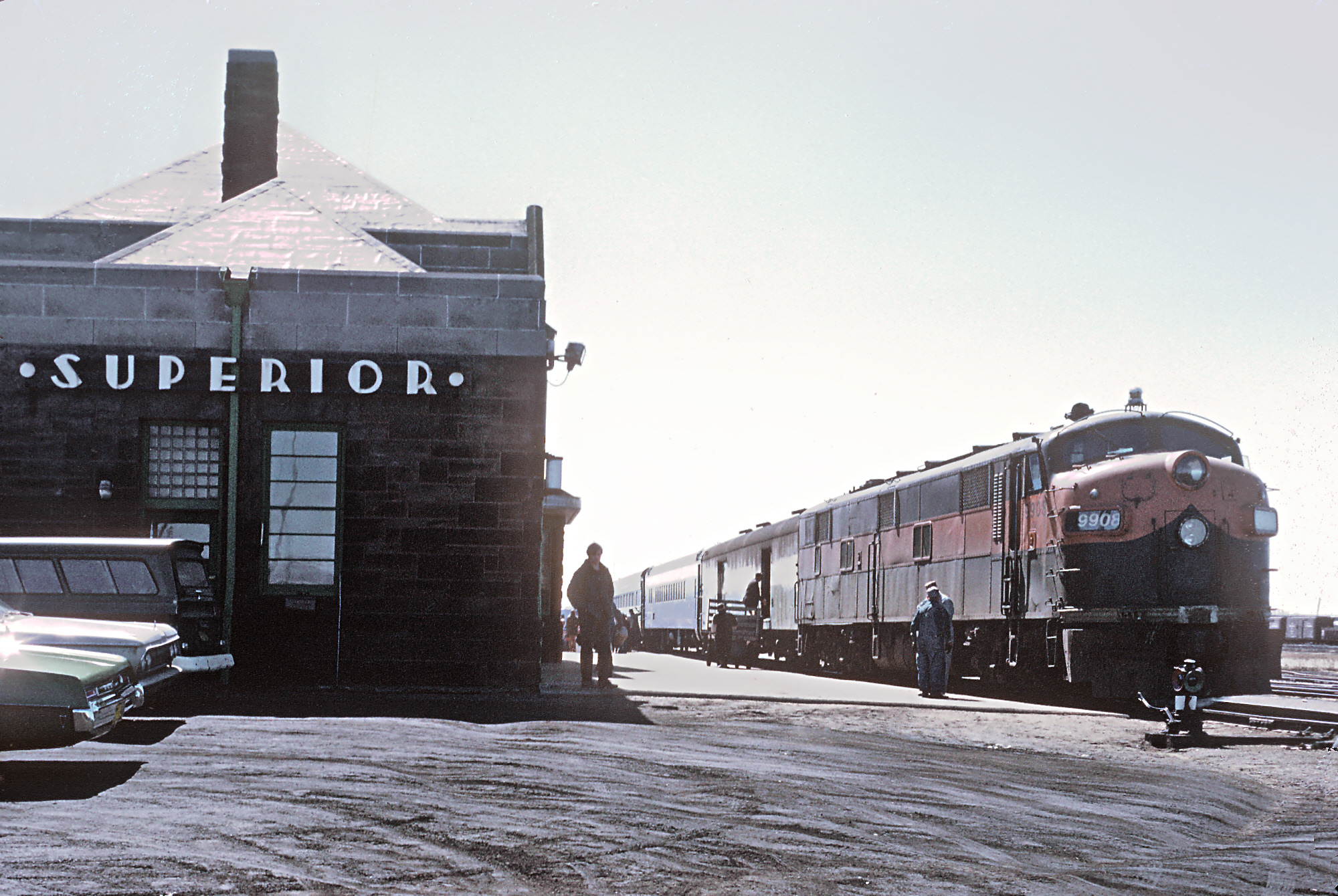
- A Burlington Northern passenger train at the station in April 1971

General information
- Location: 933 Oakes Avenue, Superior, Wisconsin 54880
- Coordinates: 46°43′36″N 92°06′27″W
- System: Inter-city rail station
- Line: BNSF Railway
- Platforms: 1 side platform

History
- Opened: 1905; April 15, 1975 (Amtrak)
- Closed: 1971; 1984
- Original company: Great Northern Railway

Former services
Preceding station	Amtrak	Following station
Duluth Terminus	North Star	Sandstone toward Chicago or Saint Paul–Midway
Duluth Terminus	Arrowhead	Sandstone toward Minneapolis
Preceding station	Great Northern Railway	Following station
Saunders toward St. Paul	St. Paul – Duluth	Duluth Terminus
Saunders toward Grand Forks	Grand Forks – Duluth	Duluth Terminus
Preceding station	Northern Pacific Railway	Following station
Saunders toward Minneapolis	Minneapolis – Duluth	Duluth Terminus
Duluth Terminus	Duluth – Ashland	East Superior toward Ashland
Location

The Superior Union Depot or Superior station of Superior, Wisconsin was built in 1905, replacing a previous depot, which had burned down in 1904. It was built of Lake Superior brown sandstone and designed by Duluth architects German and Lignell. The depot primarily served the Great Northern Railway, Northern Pacific Railway and Duluth, South Shore and Atlantic Railway.

Burlington Northern (the company absorbing the Great Northern and the Northern Pacific) ran the final passenger trains (Badger and Gopher, both to Minneapolis and St. Paul) through the station. The Northern Pacific Railway ran local unnamed service to St. Paul and Minneapolis and service to Staples, Minnesota, into the later 1960s.

Passenger service ceased upon the formation of Amtrak in 1971, but resumed between Minneapolis and Superior in 1975. Wisconsin Governor Patrick Lucey spoke at the station dedication. Superior was served by the Arrowhead and later the North Star between Chicago and Duluth. Service ceased in 1984. The depot continues to exist as a business.
