= Cambridge station (Minnesota) =

Cambridge, MN
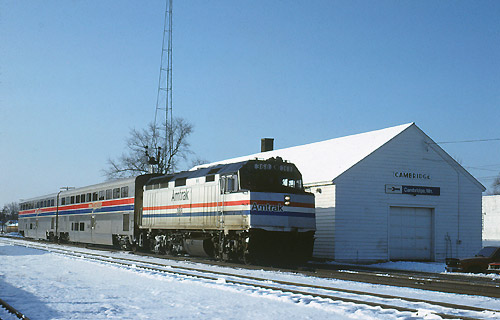
- North Star at Cambridge station in 1982

General information
- Location: 3rd Avenue SE, Cambridge, Minnesota
- Coordinates: 45.57082°N 93.22146°W
- System: Inter-city rail station
- Line: BNSF Hinckley Subdivision
- Platforms: 1 side platform (removed)
- Tracks: 2

History
- Opened: 1899; April 15, 1975 (Amtrak)
- Closed: 1971; April 7, 1985

Former services
Preceding station	Amtrak	Following station
Sandstone toward Duluth	North Star	Saint Paul–Midway toward Chicago or Saint Paul–Midway
Sandstone toward Duluth	Arrowhead	Minneapolis Terminus
Preceding station	Great Northern Railway	Following station
Isanti toward St. Paul	St. Paul – Duluth	Grandy toward Duluth
Location

The Cambridge station of Cambridge, Minnesota was built in 1899 and served the Great Northern Railway and successor Burlington Northern until 1971. Passenger service ceased upon the formation of Amtrak, but resumed between Minneapolis and Superior in 1975. Cambridge was served by the Arrowhead and later the North Star between Chicago and Duluth. Service ceased after April 7, 1985. The station building still exists, but has been relocated from the tracks.
