= Gopher (train) =

Overview
- Service type: Inter-city rail
- Status: Discontinued
- Locale: Minnesota / Wisconsin; United States
- First service: April 26, 1952
- Last service: April 30, 1971
- Successor: Arrowhead
- Former operators: Great Northern Railway; 1970-1971: Burlington Northern

Route
- Termini: St. Paul, Minnesota; Superior Union Station, Wisconsin 1975–1977; Duluth, Minnesota 1977–1978
- Stops: 6
- Distance travelled: 160 miles (260 km)
- Average journey time: 3 hours 15 minutes
- Service frequency: Daily
- Train numbers: 19 (southbound); 20 (northbound)

On-board services
- Seating arrangements: Reclining seat coaches
- Catering facilities: Parlor-buffet car

Technical
- Track gauge: 4 ft 8 1/2 in (1,435 mm)

The Gopher and Badger were trains operated by the Great Northern Railway and then Burlington Northern Railroad until the start of Amtrak between Saint Paul, Minnesota and the Twin Ports of Superior, Wisconsin and Duluth, Minnesota via Cambridge and Sandstone.

== History ==
The Great Northern introduced the services with two six-car streamlined trainsets on April 26, 1952. The two consists operated as the Badger for the morning trains #19 and #20, which operated in both directions as all-stop locals in 3 hours 58 minutes over the 160-mile (260 km) route. The late afternoon/early evening trains #23 and #24 operated as the Gopher, over the same route, but as limited-stop express trains in 3 hours 30 minutes. In addition to Saint Paul and the Twin Ports, the Gopher stopped in Minneapolis, Cambridge, and Sandstone, Minnesota Service was terminated with the establishment of Amtrak in 1971. The trains were succeeded by Amtrak's Arrowhead in 1975.

== Route ==
The Badger and Gopher route is nearly the same route as the proposed Northern Lights Express, except the NLX is not currently planned to serve Saint Paul.

== Rolling stock ==
The trains utilized six of the pre-World War II Empire Builder 58-seat luxury coaches, with four of these remaining as-built, and two converted to 44-seat coaches with galley for train service by an attendant at one's seat. Each consist was assigned a baggage/railway post office car with a 30-foot (9.1 m) RPO section; initially, one consist operated with a heavyweight, the other a lightweight. Each consist also carried a streamlined baggage express car built by the Great Northern Railway themselves; this car only operated in each day's Gopher schedule. Each consist then carried one of the 44-seat galley coaches and two of the 58-seat luxury coaches. The last car in each consist was a café parlor observation rebuilt by GN shops from heavyweight coaches the railroad had purchased at the beginning of the war from Pullman as parlor cars for rebuilding as coaches.

The entire consists were painted in Omaha Orange and Pullman Green paint with the gold Scotch-lite lettering and separation stripes paint scheme most commonly referred to as "Empire Builder". Even as there were variations in the consists regarding the baggage/railway post office cars, the power was even more interesting with one set powered by an A-B set of EMD F7s and the other train set powered by an EMD E7A.

Train consists
Consist 1	Car type	Consist 2
267A	EMD F7A 1,500 hp (1,100 kW) diesel passenger cab unit	—
267B	EMD F7B 1,500 hp diesel passenger booster unit	—
—	EMD E7A 2,000 hp (1,500 kW) Diesel passenger cab unit	508
81	Heavyweight Baggage 30’ Railway Post Office Car	87
271	Baggage-Express Car	270
945	Train Service Galley 44 Revenue seat Coach	944
948	58 Revenue seat Coach	946
949	58 Revenue seat Coach	947
1083 Twin Cities	10-seat Dining Café 26 seat Parlor Observation car	1084 Twin Ports

The #1084 Twin Ports parlor observation car survives today, although the tail end has been modified. It has been owned by the Minnesota Transportation Museum since 1979.
