= 1978 in rail transport =

This article lists events related to rail transport that occurred in 1978.

== Events ==
=== February events ===
- February 9 - Budd unveils its first SPV-2000 self-propelled railcar in Philadelphia, Pennsylvania.
- February 22 - The Waverly tank car explosion was an explosion that occurred in Waverly, Tennessee, following a train derailment incident days earlier. The explosion killed 16.

=== March events ===
- March 1
  - Australian National takes over Tasmanian Government Railways and freight and non-metropolitan operations of South Australian Railways.
  - Amtrak opens Midway station in Saint Paul, Minnesota and closes the Minneapolis Great Northern Depot. The Twin Cities Hiawatha and Arrowhead trains are combined into the North Star.
  - The M-K TE70-4S makes its first revenue run, handling a Southern Pacific Seattle–Los Angeles trailer-on-flatcar (TOFC) train between Portland and Los Angeles.
- March 16 – An extension of the Tozai Subway Line from Kita-Nijūyo-Jō Station to Asabu Station in Sapporo, Japan, opens for service.
- March 31 – In Tokyo, Japan
  - A 1-kilometre-long (0.62 mi) extension of the Tokyo Metro Chiyoda Line to Yoyogi-Uehara station is opened.
  - The Hanzomon Line is opened between Shibuya and Aoyama-itchome.
- March - Pacific Fruit Express dissolves its fleet of refrigerator cars, which is distributed between Southern Pacific and Union Pacific.

=== July events ===
- July 6 - A plastic bag of dirty linen carelessly placed against the electric heater in the vestibule of a British Rail sleeping car traveling between Penzance and London Paddington, England causes the Taunton train fire.

=== September events ===
- September 12 - The longest tunnel in New Zealand (8,896m), the Kaimai Tunnel on the East Coast Main Trunk opened.

=== October events ===
- October 29 - Via Rail assumes all passenger train operations of Canadian National and Canadian Pacific in Canada.
- October 31 - The last passenger train departs from St Louis Union Terminal.

=== November events ===
- November 7 - The Illinois Railway Museum celebrates its 25th anniversary.
- November 18 - The Merivale Bridge is opened connecting South Brisbane and Roma Street and unifying the Brisbane suburban network. Originally designed to carry both narrow gauge and standard gauge tracks, the latter was not added until 1986.

=== December events ===
- December 3 - The Southern Crescent passenger train derails at Shipman, Virginia, killing 6, injuring 60.
- December 4 - Union Pacific and Chicago & North Western jointly announce an agreement to build into Wyoming's Powder River Basin to access the numerous coal mines in the area.
- December 21 – The first phase of the Toei Shinjuku Line is opened from Iwamotocho to Higashi-ojima in Tokyo, Japan.
- December 31 - The Chicago, Rock Island and Pacific Railroad operates its last inter-city passenger trains: the Peoria Rocket (Chicago-Peoria) and the Quad Cities Rocket (Chicago-Rock Island). Trains ran until December 31, 1978 when the Rock Island ended its intercity passenger operations. The Rock Island itself would be dissolved in 1980, with its Chicago commuter rail services eventually becoming Rock Island District and the Peoria service briefly being revived from 1980 to 1981 as Amtrak's Prairie Marksman. A restored Prairie Marksman, as well as a new Quad Cities train, are proposed.

=== Unknown date events ===
- The Stone Arch Bridge built by the Great Northern Railway across the Mississippi River in Minneapolis, Minnesota sees its final use as a railroad bridge; the bridge is later converted for pedestrian and bicycle use.
- The Itel Corporation purchases the Green Bay & Western.

== Deaths ==
=== May deaths ===
- May - Harold W. Burtness, president Chicago Great Western Railway 1946–1948, dies (b. 1879).

=== July deaths ===
- July 22 - André Chapelon, French steam locomotive designer (b. 1892).
