= Passenger rail projects in Minnesota =

Overview of Minnesota passenger rail projects

There are several passenger rail projects being discussed in Minnesota. There are two existing long-distance intercity rail services, the Empire Builder and the Borealis. Future projects include a mixture of short-distance commuter rail and medium-distance regional rail lines which would run from the Twin Cities outward to neighboring states and perhaps Canada.

This article is focused on heavy-rail projects and does not discuss existing or potential light rail lines in the core Twin Cities area.

== Proposed metropolitan services ==
These corridors are generally less than 50 miles (80 km) in length, but could be expanded beyond that distance. Many have either a parallel BRT route or have not been seriously considered for passenger rail traffic.

=== Red Rock ===
The Red Rock Corridor is a 30-mile corridor running from Hastings through downtown St. Paul in the counties of Dakota, Washington, and Ramsey. Communities along the corridor include Hastings, Denmark Township, Cottage Grove, St. Paul Park, Newport, and St. Paul. Additional stops in downtown Minneapolis, the University of Minnesota, Snelling Avenue, Rice Street, Lower Afton Road, Newport were proposed, as was a deferred extension to Red Wing.

The Minneapolis end of the route was initially designated to be at Target Field station, but revised to terminate at Saint Paul Union Depot. An alternative analysis study determined Bus rapid transit to be the preferred alternative for at least part of this segment. MnDOT previously identified this line as a Tier One Passenger Rail line.

=== Gateway Corridor ===
The Gateway Corridor parallels Interstate 94 (I-94) between downtown St. Paul and the Eastern Suburbs. Studies, led by the Gateway Corridor Commission, determined BRT to be the preferred alternative for the corridor, and rail is no longer being considered.

The Metro Gold Line BRT was constructed in this corridor from St. Paul to Woodbury. It opened in 2025.

=== Rush Line ===
The Rush Line is a proposed mass transit link from downtown Saint Paul to Hinckley via White Bear Lake, Forest Lake and Pine City. Commuter rail, bus rapid transit, light rail transit and express bus options were considered for parts of the 80-mile corridor. Studies concluded in 2017, and BRT was selected as the locally preferred alternative. MnDOT previously identified this line as a Tier Two Passenger Rail line.

=== Bethel ===
The Bethel Corridor is a proposed commuter rail line along BNSF tracks between Bethel, Minnesota and downtown Minneapolis. This would follow part of the route of the proposed Northern Lights Express to Duluth, but would stop at more stations. The project is no longer updated and assumed to be abandoned. MnDOT previously identified this line as a Tier Two Passenger Rail line.

=== Norwood/Young America ===
The Norwood Corridor is a proposed rail line between Minnetonka and downtown Minneapolis, using existing Twin Cities & Western trackage. It is unknown if the line will go beyond the study process, although MnDOT previously identified this line as a Tier Two Passenger Rail line. This route slightly overlaps the Metro Green Line (Minnesota) Extension.

=== Dan Patch Line ===
The Dan Patch Corridor is a proposed commuter rail line which runs from Minneapolis to Northfield, Minnesota. The plan was under consideration until 2002, when a bill passed that banned further study on the route. MnDOT previously identified this line as a Tier One Passenger Rail line.

== Proposed regional services ==
These services will run distances of more than 50 miles (80 km) and would have the potential to run at speeds higher than the common limit of 79 mph. They will likely have fewer stops than the routes outlined above. Several routes were outlined in the 2009 Minnesota Comprehensive Statewide Freight and Passenger Rail Plan. The plan had two phases defined: Phase I for projects intended for completion before 2030, and Phase II for projects beyond that date.

=== Northern Lights Express ===
The Northern Lights Express is a proposed line to Superior, Wisconsin and Duluth, Minnesota. About halfway along the line is Hinckley, Minnesota which is expected to be a big draw from both ends of the line due to the presence of a major casino. This could be considered inter-city rail due to a limited number of stops. It is planned to run at up to 110 miles per hour (177 km/h).

=== Fargo/Moorhead-Twin Cities ===
Expanded service to the Fargo–Moorhead area on the North Dakota–Minnesota border is also planned for Phase I. The Amtrak Empire Builder serves this route, but it is inconveniently timed for passengers in Fargo since the trains in both directions are scheduled for station stops between 2 and 4 AM. They use BNSF Railway's busy northern transcontinental line, which is expected to need significant upgrades in order to handle increasing freight traffic.

=== Twin Cities-Milwaukee-Chicago Second Train ===
A second train on the Twin Cities-Milwaukee-Chicago corridor (TCMC) has been proposed as a complement to Empire Builder service. MnDOT published a feasibility report in 2015 that proposed trains depart Chicago at 10:25am and arrive in St. Paul at 6:15pm. The proposal also recommends interlining the TCMC train with one of Amtrak's Hiawatha trips and expanding the service to Minneapolis Target Field Station or St. Cloud. Service was expected to start 2022, pending funding availability.

The TCMC train began service in May 2024 as the Borealis.

=== Rochester ===
Part of MnDot's state rail plan is a proposed line connecting the southeastern city of Rochester with St. Paul and Minneapolis. This route would require building a new line. There is no direct freight rail connection between Rochester and the Twin Cities. Plans for the line are vague.

=== Southern Minnesota ===
From Minneapolis or St. Paul to Northfield, Faribault, Owatonna and Albert Lea, with eventual plans to go south to Des Moines and Kansas City.

=== Eau Claire ===
Along with the Northern Lights Express and the Rochester link, a line eastward to Eau Claire, Wisconsin was identified in 2009 as a Phase I corridor for implementation before 2030. It would use "enhanced conventional" service of 79 to 90 mph (127 to 145 km/h) and would likely make use of existing rails owned by the Union Pacific Railroad (ex-Omaha Road/Chicago and North Western). This could become Eau Claire's first train service since the Twin Cities 400 ended service in 1963. In August 2010, it was designated as the "Gateway Corridor" and an alternatives analysis study was begun.

=== Mankato ===
The Minnesota Valley Line running southwest to Mankato, Minnesota was also identified as a Phase I corridor with "enhanced conventional" 79 to 90 mph speeds in 2009.

=== Phase II corridors ===
Conventional-speed trains running up to 79 mph are also planned beyond 2030 for

- The Little Crow Line from the Twin Cities to westward to Willmar, Minnesota and Sioux Falls, South Dakota.
- Expanding from the Minnesota Valley Line in Mankato through Worthington, Minnesota and beyond toward Sioux City, Iowa
- And an extension northward from Fargo/Moorhead to Winnipeg, Manitoba, Canada.

== See also ==
- Canceled transitway projects in Minneapolis-St. Paul
