= Brainerd Subdivision =

Railway line in Minnesota

The Brainerd Subdivision is a rail line owned and operated by BNSF Railway. It runs from Staples, Minnesota where it connects with the Staples Subdivision to Carlton, Minnesota and the Lakes Subdivision, about 150 miles (240 km) in length.

The line was initially built by Northern Pacific Railway with service commencing in about 1911. In 1970, the Northern Pacific merged with other railroads to form the Burlington Northern Railroad. The company then merged with Atchison, Topeka and Santa Fe Railway (ATSF) in 1996 to form BNSF.

As of 2021 the rail line gets about seven trains daily, most of which are coal and one local that works Sunday and Wednesday. Speed limits along some parts of the line are a maximum of 49 mph.

== Rail yard ==
The Brainerd Sub features one small rail yard in Brainerd. Most of the yard is maintenance-of-way equipment based out of the BNSF Brainerd Shops. It also has a spur line that leads to Brainerd Industrial Center via a street running segment.
