= Morris station (Minnesota) =

Railway station in Morris, Minnesota, United States

Morris, MN
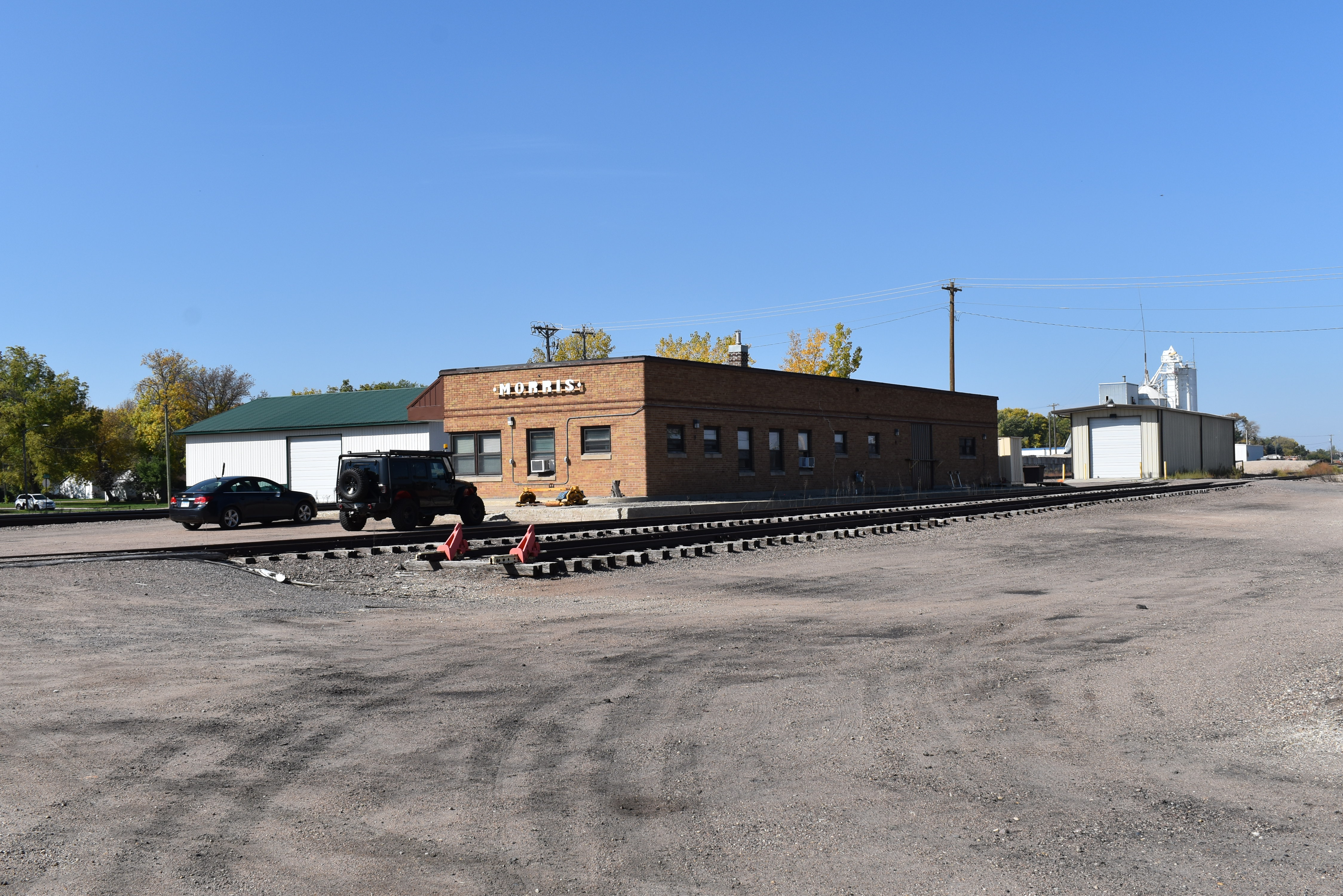
- The Morris, MN station in 2021

General information
- Location: Atlantic Avenue between 10th and 11th Streets, Morris, Minnesota
- Coordinates: 45.590499°N 95.919308°W
- System: Inter-city rail station
- Line: BNSF Morris Subdivision

History
- Closed: October 1, 1979

Former services
Preceding station	Amtrak	Following station
Breckenridge toward Seattle or Portland	Empire Builder	Willmar toward Chicago
Preceding station	Great Northern Railway	Following station
Donnelly toward Seattle	Main Line	Hancock toward St. Paul
Location

The Morris station of Morris, Minnesota served the Great Northern Railway and successor Burlington Northern until 1971. Thereafter, passenger service continued under Amtrak, but with only a single route through Morris, the Empire Builder. After the North Coast Hiawatha, which ran on the former Northern Pacific Railway line from Minneapolis to Fargo ended service in 1979, the Empire Builder moved to that corridor.
