= Willmar station =

Railroad station in Minnesota

Willmar, MN
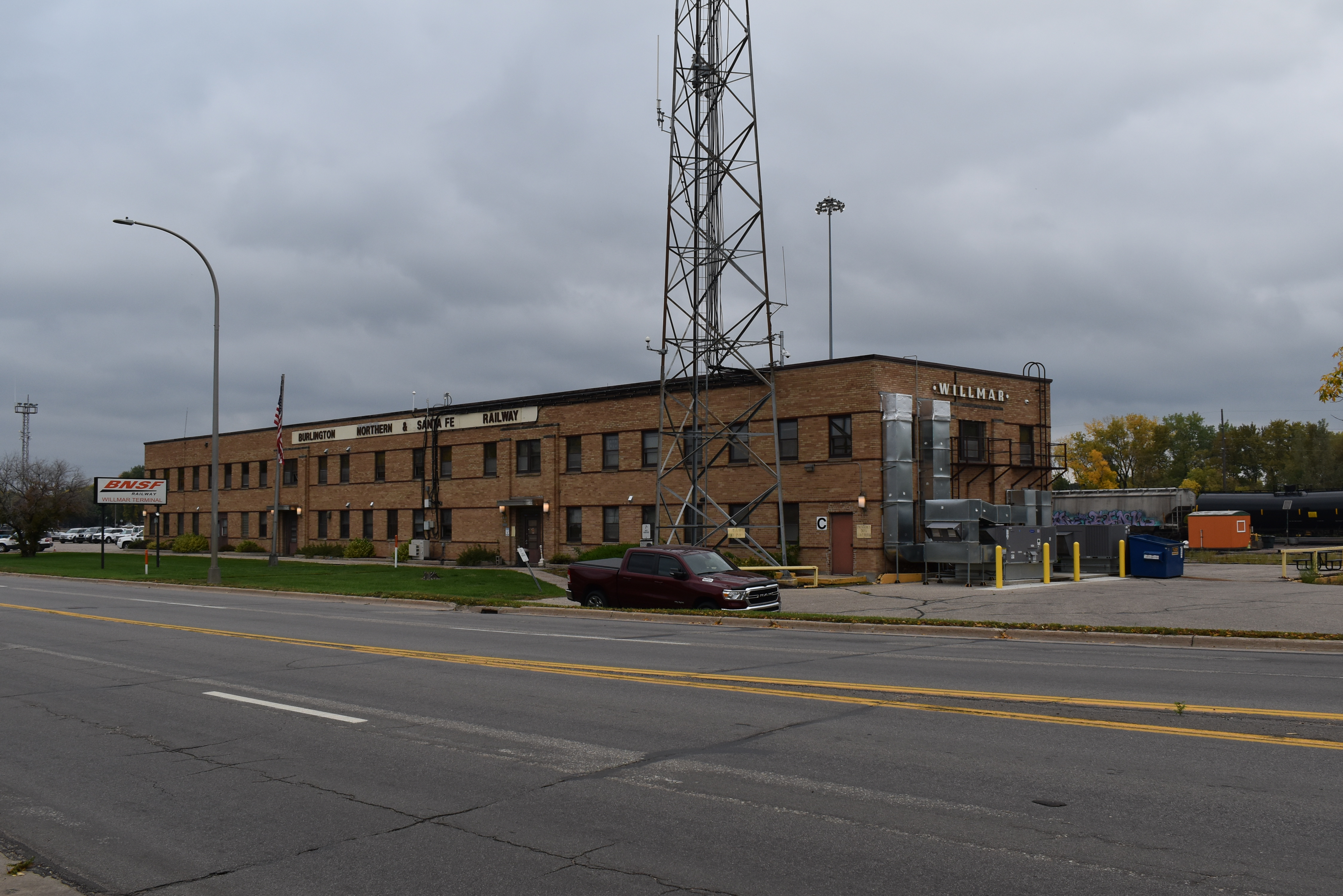
- The former Willmar station in 2021

General information
- Location: 400 Pacific Avenue, Willmar, Minnesota
- Coordinates: 45.12290°N 95.04845°W
- System: Inter-city rail station
- Line: BNSF Morris Subdivision

History
- Opened: 1892
- Closed: October 1, 1979
- Rebuilt: 1948

Former services
Preceding station	Amtrak	Following station
Morris toward Seattle or Portland	Empire Builder	Minneapolis 1971–1978 toward Chicago
Morris toward Seattle or Portland	Empire Builder	Saint Paul–Midway 1978–1979 toward Chicago
Preceding station	Great Northern Railway	Following station
Pennock toward Seattle	Main Line	Kandiyohi toward St. Paul
Location

The Willmar station of Willmar, Minnesota was built in 1948, replacing an 1892 Cass Gilbert designed depot. It served the Great Northern Railway and its successor Burlington Northern until 1971. Thereafter, passenger service continued under Amtrak, but with only a single route through Willmar, the Empire Builder. After the North Coast Hiawatha, which ran on the former Northern Pacific Railway line from Minneapolis to Fargo, ended service in 1979, the Empire Builder moved to that corridor.
