= Minnesota Ballet =

Ballet company in Duluth, Minnesota

The Minnesota Ballet is a ballet company and school located in Duluth, Minnesota in the St. Louis County Depot. Founded in 1965 by Donna Harkins and Jan Gibson as the Duluth Civic Ballet, the company has since expanded into a touring company with seventeen professional artists. From 1992 to 2007 the Artistic Executive Director of the Minnesota Ballet was Allen Fields, who retired to become Artistic Director Emeritus. Fields acquired rights to works by choreographers including Agnes de Mille, Antony Tudor, and George Balanchine. He was succeeded by Robert Gardner. In 2019 Karl von Rabenau was appointed Artistic Director. The Minnesota Ballet entered its 54th season in 2019/20.

== History ==
Before the Minnesota Ballet existed, Donna Harkin was a ballet teacher with a studio in Duluth. In spring 1965 she choreographed and produced the first all-ballet performance featuring area amateur dancers. The show proved so popular that Northlanders wanted to encourage the young dancers. In December 1965, twenty ballet supporters in the Duluth area formed a board of directors, with Jan Gibson as the first president, establishing the Duluth Civic Ballet with the intention of providing instruction in ballet and using the area's students to form an amateur performing company. The first budget was $1,000.

The Minnesota Ballet expanded into an internationally touring company in 1995 with a performance in San Salvador, El Salvador. Since then the Ballet regularly performs their Nutcracker production in Thunder Bay, Ontario. The Minnesota Ballet also brings its productions to other cities in Minnesota and the surrounding region.

== School of the Minnesota Ballet ==
Classes range from Pre-Ballet through Ballet VII and pre-professional training; pointe, jazz, modern and tap are also offered. Additionally, the School offers creative movement classes to accommodate those with special needs. The School offers annual opportunities for students to audition and perform in The Nutcracker with the professional company. The ballet company has a community outreach program designed to introduce the world of ballet to children throughout the region.

== Company ==
As of 2023 the artistic staff included:

Karl von Rabenau: The Artistic Executive Director of the Minnesota Ballet

A Duluth native, Karl von Rabenau began his ballet career in Minnesota. von Rabenau started training in the School of the Duluth Ballet, now Minnesota Ballet. He continued his training at Minnesota Dance Theatre, the San Francisco Ballet School, and the Boston Ballet School, where he was asked to join Boston Ballet II and, shortly thereafter, to apprentice with the Boston Ballet company. von Rabenau joined the Omaha Ballet in 1987. In 1988 Balanchine ballerina Patricia Wilde invitated him to join the Pittsburgh Ballet Theatre; he toured with her the National Theater & Concert Hall in Taipei, Taiwan. von Rabenau danced his final 10 seasons as a soloist with the Milwaukee Ballet, most of those years under the direction of Michael Pink. His repertoire included soloist and principal roles in dance masterworks by Alvin Ailey, George Balanchine, Jean-Paul Comelin, John Cranko, Agnes de Mille, Lisa de Ribere, Choo San Goh, José Limón, Eugene Loring, David Parsons, Marius Petipa, and Bruce Wells.

Jennifer Miller: Ballet Master, School of the Minnesota Ballet

Miller joined the artistic staff of the Minnesota Ballet as Ballet Master after completing nearly 30 years with the Milwaukee Ballet. She danced for the Milwaukee Ballet Company, reaching the level of Principal Artist. She has danced in ballets including Swan Lake, The Nutcracker, Romeo and Juliet, Hunchback of Notre Dame, Scheherazade, Giselle, Coppélia, Midsummer Night's Dream, Sleeping Beauty, and works by Trey McIntyre, Choo San Goh, David Parsons, George Balanchine, Gerald Arpino, Peter Anastos, Antony Tudor, Lila York, Margo Sappington, Alvin Ailey, Bruce Wells, and Michael Pink. In the summer of 2005, Miller danced for the inaugural season of the Trey McIntyre Project, performing in Vail International Dance Festival and Jacob's Pillow Dance Festival.

Lila Ann Coates White: Artistic Associate/Principal Teacher

A native of Kansas City, Missouri, Coates White danced six seasons with the Minnesota Ballet before retiring from performing in 1993 to turn to teaching and choreographing. The 2018–19 season was her 25th year as Principal Teacher of the School of the Minnesota Ballet. Coates White has choreographed works on the school, including a Tribute to the School, set to Alexander Glazunov's Scènes de Ballet for thirty-six students in the Ballet's 50th Anniversary Gala Performance. She has set classical excerpts on upper-level students, such as the exotic “Kingdom of the Shades,” from Marius Petipa's La Bayadère.

== Choreographers ==
George Balanchine is a leading contemporary choreographer, is responsible for the choreography in the show "Who Cares?”, a show in the Minnesota Ballet repertoire. George Balanchine was born in St.Petersburg, Russia in 1904. At the young age of 29, he came to the United States, where he co-founded the School of American Ballet in 1934 with an American arts patron, Lincoln Kirstein. On October 11, 1948, The New York City Ballet was founded, and Balanchine became the principal choreographer and ballet master from 1948 until his death in 1983. Balanchine revolutionized classical ballet, by Americanizing his Russian influences. The two styles blended together and created an upbeat dance.

Antony Tudor, originally named William John Cook, was born in London, England on April 4, 1908. Antony Tudor changed his name after becoming Dame Marie Rambert's general assistant. In 1939 he moved from London to New York City to help Lucia Chase and Agnes de Mille establish the Ballet Theatre (the American Ballet Theatre). He was resident choreographer of American Ballet Theatre for ten years. Tudor choreographed with emotion of the whole body, not just with facial expressions. He also created works that were attentive to detail.

Penelope Freeh is a guest choreographer at the Minnesota ballet. Freeh has been a member of the James Sewell Ballet in Minneapolis for fifteen years. In 1998 Freeh received a Minnesota State Arts Board Fellowship and also won a McKnight Fellowship for Dancers in 2003 she received a Jerome Foundation Travel Grant.

== Repertoire ==
The company's repertoire includes performances from 1965 to the present, including:

- Sleeping Beauty
- Suite Italienne
- One Night
- Three Virgins and a Devil
- Apollo
- Cinderella
- The Nutcracker
- Coppélia
- Dracula
- A Midsummer Night's Dream
- Carnival of the Animals
- The Firebird
- Giselle Act II
- Swan Lake
- Rite of Spring
- Clowns and Others

== 2018–19 Company dancers ==
- Emma Stratton
- Naomi Doty
- Brennan Benson
- Branson Bice
- Charles Clark
- Sam Neale
- Brigid Duffin
- Sarah Gresik
- Brianna Crockett
- Daniel Westfield
- Tyler Piwowarczyk
- Eric Pagnano
- Sarah White
- Rachel Fuchs- Senior Apprentice
- Payton Kline- Senior Apprentice
- Erin Haebig- Apprentice
