= Buchanan County, Minnesota =

Buchanan County is a former county in the U.S. state of Minnesota. It was established May 23, 1857, as a county in the Minnesota Territory, named after President James Buchanan. It comprised the 24 northern townships, now forming the northern half of Pine County, Minnesota. The Buchanan County seat was Fortuna (known today as Sandstone). This county was dissolved and incorporated with Pine County in 1861.

In recent years, residents of Pine County proposed dividing the county in half, re-introducing Buchanan County. The referendum for this proposal went to ballot in 2000 and was rejected.
