= Canceled transitway projects in Minneapolis–Saint Paul =

In addition to the proposed transit projects in the Twin Cities region, there have been some transit corridors that are no longer proposed.

== Riverview Corridor ==
The Riverview Corridor is an arterial transit corridor from Downtown Saint Paul to the Mall of America via the Minneapolis-Saint Paul International Airport. The most discussed proposal was a Bus Rapid Transit corridor project, running from the Maplewood Mall to the Mall of America, through the Saint Paul Union Depot in Downtown Saint Paul. The route would have used some sections of the Central Corridor and Hiawatha Line and run along the center of West 7th Street. The project was canceled when the Minnesota Legislature took back the majority of unspent allocated funds. Concerns about the project included low ridership predictions and neighborhood opposition to the needed right of way expansion. It would have been possible that this line could have connected both the Blue Line and Green Line, making a transit way triangle. Bus service along the route was later improved, although not to the proposed Bus Rapid Transit project levels.

This corridor, of the canceled projects, had and continues to have the most consideration. The City Council of Saint Paul voted on January 23, 2013 to request the Ramsey County Regional Rail Authority to conduct a new study of this transit corridor.

In January 2026, Metro Transit announced that the Riverview Corridor had been selected as the Metro J Line, expected to be completed between 2030 and 2035.

== Dan Patch Corridor ==
The Dan Patch Corridor was a future Commuter Rail Line. It was to run from Minneapolis to Northfield along the tracks of the former Minneapolis, Northfield and Southern Railway. It was initially identified as a Tier 1 corridor in the Minnesota Department of Transportation's 2000 Commuter Rail System Plan before being given a study ban during the 2002 Minnesota legislative session.

After receiving strong support to restudy this corridor, MnDOT has re-identified the Dan Patch Corridor as a Tier 1 Project for implementation within the next 20 years. Current stances of communities along the corridor; Minneapolis supports the Dan Patch Corridor project; St. Louis Park has an official stance against the Dan Patch Corridor project; Edina supports the Dan Patch Corridor project with a guarantee that the community will have at least one station; Bloomington is neutral towards the project and is willing to work with MnDOT on future passenger rail on the Dan Patch Corridor; Savage supports the Dan Patch Corridor project; Burnsville has no official stance; Lakeville is against any public spending for study and construction of the Dan Patch Corridor and; Northfield supports the Dan Patch Corridor project.

== Cedar/Galaxie Corridor ==
The Cedar/Galaxie Corridor was a proposed light rail extension for the Hiawatha Line between Mall of America and Apple Valley. It was canceled because of high costs. Bus rapid transit was reinstated for the project instead. See Red Line (Minnesota)
