= Lakes Subdivision =

Railway line in Minnesota and Wisconsin

The Lakes Subdivision or Lakes Sub is a railway line operated by BNSF Railway that runs about 157 miles (253 km) from the Grand Forks Subdivision at Cass Lake, Minnesota, to Superior, Wisconsin, where there are a number of lines. U.S. Highway 2 runs parallel to the line for most of its route. U.S. 2 continues across the St. Louis River east of Brookston, while the rail line stays on the southern bank of the river. Prior to the creation of BNSF, the line was operated by the Burlington Northern Railroad as part of their Lake Superior Division. Today, it is operated by BNSF's Twin Cities Division.

BNSF's Casco Subdivision to Hibbing connects to the Lakes Sub on both ends, at Gunn near Grand Rapids and at Brookston. The Lakes Sub also has a junction with the Brainerd Subdivision at Carlton and the Hinckley Subdivision at Boylston in Wisconsin.

As of 2009, the line carried about seven trains per day which primarily had loads of coal and taconite.
