= Foxboro, Wisconsin =

- Unincorporated community
- Location within Wisconsin Location within the United States
- Coordinates: 46°29′55″N 92°17′17″W
- Country: United States
- State: Wisconsin
- County: Douglas
- Town: Summit
- Elevation: 922 ft (281 m)
- Time zone: UTC-6 (Central (CST))
  - Summer (DST): UTC-5 (CDT)
- ZIP codes: 54836
- Area codes: 715 and 534
- GNIS feature ID: 1565238

Foxboro is an unincorporated community, in Douglas County, in the town of Summit, in the northwestern part of the U.S. state of Wisconsin.

County Road B serves as a main route in the community. Wisconsin Highway 35 is nearby.

Foxboro is located southwest of the city of Superior; and located west of Pattison State Park and Big Manitou Falls. Foxboro has a zip code, 54836 but no post office. The nearest post offices are Superior and South Range.

== Climate ==
Climate data for Foxboro, Wisconsin, 1991–2020 normals, 1963-2020 extremes: 932ft (284m)
Month	Jan	Feb	Mar	Apr	May	Jun	Jul	Aug	Sep	Oct	Nov	Dec	Year
Record high °F (°C)	54 (12)	59 (15)	79 (26)	89 (32)	94 (34)	98 (37)	104 (40)	99 (37)	100 (38)	88 (31)	75 (24)	57 (14)	104 (40)
Mean maximum °F (°C)	41.3 (5.2)	46.8 (8.2)	60.6 (15.9)	75.2 (24.0)	84.0 (28.9)	88.2 (31.2)	90.6 (32.6)	88.8 (31.6)	84.2 (29.0)	77.6 (25.3)	58.7 (14.8)	42.5 (5.8)	92.4 (33.6)
Mean daily maximum °F (°C)	19.8 (−6.8)	25.9 (−3.4)	37.5 (3.1)	49.5 (9.7)	63.2 (17.3)	72.1 (22.3)	77.8 (25.4)	75.9 (24.4)	67.7 (19.8)	53.9 (12.2)	37.6 (3.1)	25.0 (−3.9)	50.5 (10.3)
Daily mean °F (°C)	9.9 (−12.3)	15.0 (−9.4)	26.7 (−2.9)	38.3 (3.5)	49.8 (9.9)	59.1 (15.1)	65.8 (18.8)	64.6 (18.1)	56.6 (13.7)	43.7 (6.5)	29.4 (−1.4)	16.6 (−8.6)	39.6 (4.3)
Mean daily minimum °F (°C)	0.0 (−17.8)	4.2 (−15.4)	16.0 (−8.9)	27.0 (−2.8)	36.5 (2.5)	46.1 (7.8)	53.8 (12.1)	53.3 (11.8)	45.5 (7.5)	33.5 (0.8)	21.1 (−6.1)	8.1 (−13.3)	28.8 (−1.8)
Mean minimum °F (°C)	−24.6 (−31.4)	−19.9 (−28.8)	−11.3 (−24.1)	11.8 (−11.2)	24.5 (−4.2)	33.1 (0.6)	41.6 (5.3)	40.6 (4.8)	28.9 (−1.7)	18.4 (−7.6)	0.0 (−17.8)	−17.1 (−27.3)	−27.0 (−32.8)
Record low °F (°C)	−45 (−43)	−42 (−41)	−35 (−37)	−4 (−20)	5 (−15)	21 (−6)	23 (−5)	28 (−2)	18 (−8)	−1 (−18)	−30 (−34)	−43 (−42)	−45 (−43)
Average precipitation inches (mm)	0.75 (19)	0.68 (17)	1.45 (37)	2.56 (65)	3.28 (83)	4.09 (104)	4.33 (110)	3.73 (95)	3.86 (98)	2.98 (76)	1.94 (49)	1.11 (28)	30.76 (781)
Average snowfall inches (cm)	12.6 (32)	10.0 (25)	10.8 (27)	7.0 (18)	0.1 (0.25)	0.0 (0.0)	0.0 (0.0)	0.0 (0.0)	0.0 (0.0)	0.4 (1.0)	7.8 (20)	12.9 (33)	61.6 (156.25)
Source 1: NOAA(1981-2010 precipitation)
Source 2: XMACIS (1992-2015 snowfall, records & monthly max/mins)
