= North Star (Amtrak train) =

Former Amtrak passenger train

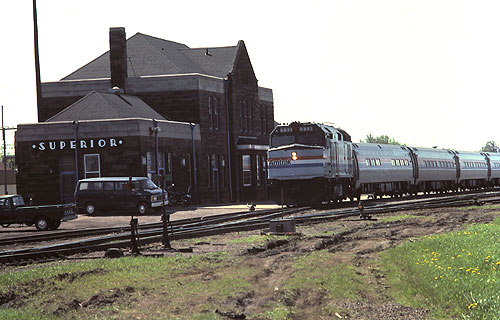
- The North Star at the Superior Depot

Overview
- Service type: Inter-city rail
- Status: Discontinued
- Locale: Midwestern United States
- Predecessor: Arrowhead & Twin Cities Hiawatha
- First service: April 30, 1978
- Last service: April 7, 1985
- Successor: Borealis & Northern Lights Express
- Former operator: Amtrak

Route
- Termini: Chicago, Illinois (1978–1981); Saint Paul, Minnesota (1981–1985); Duluth, Minnesota
- Distance travelled: 573 mi (922 km) (1978–1981); 153 mi (246 km) (1981–1985)
- Train number: 9, 10

Technical
- Track gauge: 4 ft 8 1/2 in (1,435 mm)
- Track owners: Milwaukee Road; BN Railroad

The North Star was a passenger train operated by Amtrak (the National Railroad Passenger Corporation) between Duluth, Minnesota and Saint Paul, Minnesota. It originally operated from Chicago, Illinois via St. Paul to Superior, Wisconsin and Duluth, but was soon cut back to a Saint Paul–Duluth train. The service relied in part on funding from the state of Minnesota.

== History ==
The North Star was introduced in the spring of 1978, when Amtrak moved Twin Cities operations from the Great Northern Depot in Minneapolis to Midway station in Saint Paul and combined the previous Chicago–Minneapolis Twin Cities Hiawatha and the Minneapolis–Duluth Arrowhead services into one train. Where the Arrowhead's route was 148 miles (238 km) long, the North Star was a 573-mile (922 km) sleeper originating in Chicago at 10:30 PM in the initial schedule. It took 8 hours 45 minutes to reach Saint Paul, where there was a 35-minute layover. It then took another 3:45 to reach Duluth for an overall schedule of just over 13 hours from Chicago.

Three other trains shared parts of the North Star route: the quad-weekly Empire Builder from Chicago to Portland, Oregon and Seattle, Washington, via the Milwaukee Road to St. Paul and the former Great Northern beyond; the thrice-weekly North Coast Hiawatha, also from Chicago to Portland and Seattle, on the Milwaukee to St. Paul and the former Northern Pacific beyond; and the daily Turboliner between Chicago and Milwaukee. The Empire Builder became a daily train again in 1979 when the North Coast Hiawatha was eliminated.

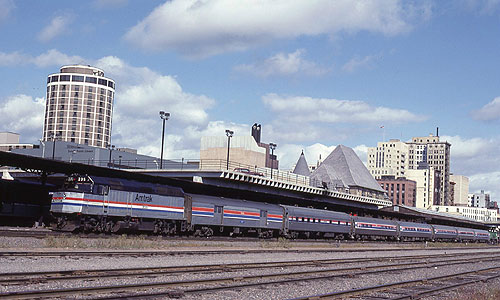
The North Star at the Duluth Depot

There were perennial budget battles involving the North Star. In October 1981 cost-cutting measures forced the service to be converted to a Twin Cities–Duluth local, which left the daily Empire Builder as the only Chicago–Twin Cities connection. No effort was made to link the schedules of the two trains. At this time, the schedule was 3 hours 35 minutes from Saint Paul to Duluth. It briefly stopped service in September 1982 when Amtrak requested $27,000 (equivalent to $87,973 in 2024) in funding to keep it operating as a weekend and peak period train. Duluth businessman Jeno Paulucci offered a $25,000 (equivalent to $81,457 in 2024) donation, with the rest intended to be covered from some other source. U.S. Senator David Durenberger (R-MN) also requested that Amtrak run a financial audit, which uncovered an extra $100,000 (equivalent to $325,828 in 2024) in available funds.

By the end of service in 1985, the North Star no longer served Superior and made intermediate stops only in Cambridge and Sandstone. State funding ran out in March 1985, and the train made its final run on April 7 of that year.

== See also ==
- North Shore Scenic Railroad
- Northern Lights Express, a proposed restoration of passenger rail service between the Twin Cities and Duluth
