= Arrowhead (train) =

Former Amtrak passenger train

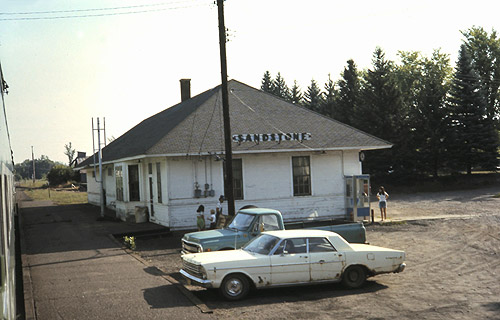
- View from the Arrowhead at Sandstone in 1976

Overview
- Service type: Inter-city rail
- Status: Discontinued
- Locale: Minnesota / Wisconsin; United States
- Predecessor: Gopher
- First service: April 15, 1975
- Last service: April 30, 1978
- Successor: North Star
- Former operator(s): Amtrak

Route
- Termini: Minneapolis, Minnesota; Superior, Wisconsin 1975–1977; Duluth, Minnesota 1977–1978
- Stops: 3–5
- Distance travelled: 148 miles (238 km)
- Average journey time: 3 hours 20 minutes
- Service frequency: Daily
- Train number(s): 760-761

On-board services
- Class(es): Unreserved coach
- Catering facilities: On-board cafe

Technical
- Rolling stock: Amfleet coaches
- Track gauge: 4 ft 8 1/2 in (1,435 mm)
- Track owner(s): Milwaukee Road

The Arrowhead was a daily passenger train operated by Amtrak (the National Railroad Passenger Corporation) between Minneapolis, Minnesota, and Superior, Wisconsin, in the United States. After two years of operation, service was extended from Superior to Duluth, Minnesota.

== Description ==
The Arrowhead began on April 16, 1975, as a daily all-coach train between Minneapolis and Superior, Wisconsin, with no intervening stops along the 144-mile (232 km) route. This service replaced the Burlington Northern Badger and Gopher trains that were terminated in 1971. The Arrowhead departed Superior in the mornings and returned in the evenings; its schedule allowed an easy connection to the North Coast Hiawatha, which offered daily service from Minneapolis to Chicago, Illinois. A bus covered the final 4 miles (6.4 km) to Duluth. Both the state of Minnesota and the Upper Great Lakes Regional Commission provided financial support for the train. Initially the Arrowhead carried an on-board cafe.

In November 1975 Amtrak added Sandstone, Minnesota, and Cambridge, Minnesota, as intermediate stops (the same stops that had been on the predecessor Gopher express train), and augmented the train's consist with a lounge car and a baggage car. A schedule change to the North Coast Hiawatha broke the northbound connection to the Arrowhead from Chicago beginning in October 1976; the southbound connection was unaffected.

A major change came in February 1977: Amtrak extended the Arrowhead to Duluth, eliminating the bus connection. The entire schedule flipped; the Arrowhead departed Minneapolis in the morning and returned from Duluth in the evening. Gone was any same-day connection to Chicago. The Arrowhead also gained one of the new Amfleet "Amcafes" and Amfleet coaches. Another schedule change in January 1978 restored a same-day connection to Chicago with the combined Empire Builder/North Coast Hiawatha. Amtrak also increased Friday service: a morning and evening train from Minneapolis with a mid-day and late night return from Duluth. On April 30, 1978, Amtrak replaced the Arrowhead and the Twin Cities Hiawatha (a Chicago–Minneapolis train) with the North Star, a Chicago–Minneapolis–Duluth sleeper. The Arrowhead was one of the last trains to use Minneapolis' Great Northern Depot; Amtrak shifted all Twin Cities service to the Midway station in Saint Paul.

== See also ==
- Northern Lights Express, proposed passenger rail service between Duluth and Minneapolis
