= Duluth Depot =

St. Louis County Depot
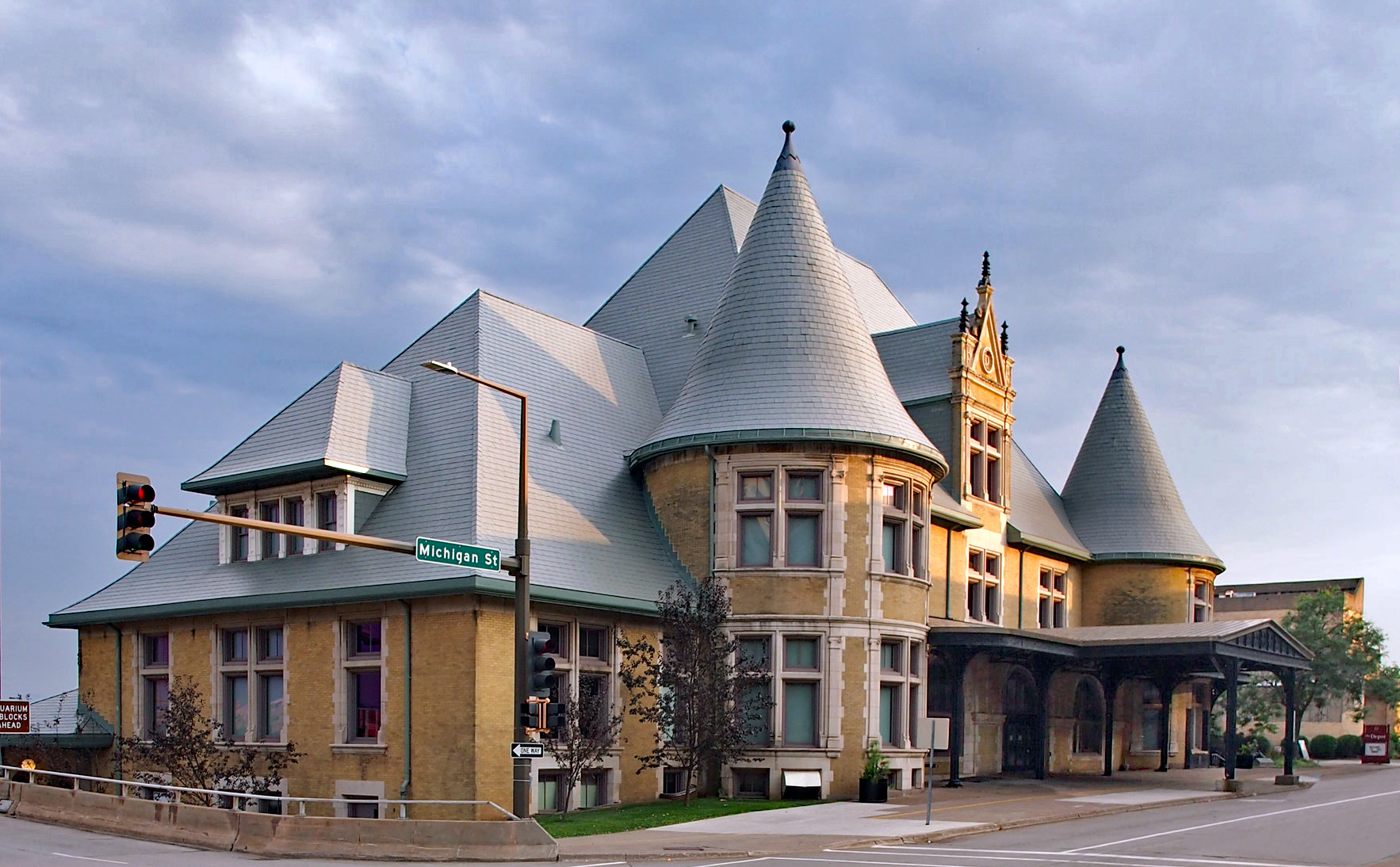
- The Depot viewed from the north
- Established: 1973
- Location: 506 W. Michigan Street, Duluth, Minnesota, United States
- Coordinates: 46°46′53″N 92°6′14″W
- Type: Arts and Culture Center
- Architect: Peabody and Stearns
- Public transit access: DTA
- Website: experiencethedepot.org

Duluth, MN
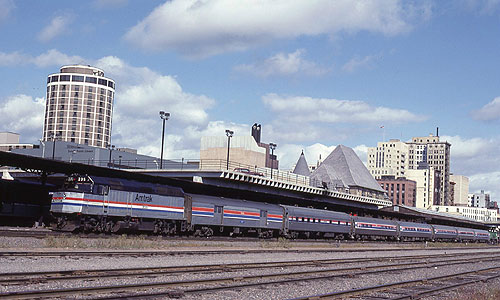
- The North Star at the Duluth Depot, September 1981

General information
- System: Former Amtrak inter-city rail station
- Line: North Star
- Platforms: 3 island platform 1 side platform
- Tracks: 7

History
- Opened: 1892
- Closed: 1985

Proposed services
Preceding station	Amtrak	Following station
Terminus	Northern Lights Express	Superior toward Minneapolis Target Field

Former services
Preceding station	Amtrak	Following station
Terminus	Arrowhead	Superior toward Minneapolis
Terminus	North Star	Superior toward Chicago or Saint Paul–Midway
Preceding station	Great Northern Railway	Following station
Superior toward St. Paul	St. Paul – Duluth	Terminus
Superior toward Grand Forks	Grand Forks – Duluth	Terminus
Preceding station	Northern Pacific Railway	Following station
Superior toward Minneapolis	Minneapolis – Duluth	Terminus
West Duluth toward Minneapolis	Minneapolis – Duluth Via West Duluth	Terminus
Superior toward Staples	Staples – Duluth	Terminus
Terminus	Duluth – Ashland	Superior toward Ashland
- St. Louis County Depot
- U.S. National Register of Historic Places
- Architectural style: Châteauesque
- NRHP reference No.: 71001028
- Added to NRHP: December 9, 1971
Location

The St. Louis County Depot is a historic railroad station in Duluth, Minnesota, United States. It was built as a union station in 1892, serving seven railroads at its peak. Rail service ceased in 1969 and the building was threatened with demolition until it reopened in 1973 as St. Louis County Heritage & Arts Center (The Depot). Train service also resumed from 1974 to 1985, by Amtrak.

Owned today by St. Louis County, the building houses two museums (Lake Superior Railroad Museum, and St. Louis County Historical Society Museum), two performing arts organizations (DSSO and Minnesota Ballet), and serves as the departure point for the North Shore Scenic Railroad.

== Description ==
The Depot is located at 506 West Michigan Avenue right off of I-35, which runs immediately southeast of the Depot. The historic building houses several contemporary and historic artworks and artifacts, as well as an experimental theater, and also hosts public events in its Great Hall. The 1977 addition, houses a large theater and a ballet studio. The lower station has one side platform and three island platforms that provide access to its seven tracks. The outer southeast active track is used by a scenic railroad, with the remainder being used to display various trains and train cars.

== History ==
The current building is the second depot built on this site. The first, a small wooden building, was built in 1869. That same year a large group of Swedish immigrants arrived in Duluth, seeking work on the first railroad line to serve the city, the Lake Superior and Mississippi.

The Depot was designed by architectural firm Peabody and Stearns. Many local materials were used in the French Norman-style building, including granite, sandstone, and yellow brick. After two years of construction, the Depot was completed in 1892 at a cost of $615,000, at which point the earlier depot was demolished.

Over the decades, it served seven railroads: Duluth & Iron Range, Duluth, Missabe, & Iron Range, Duluth, South Shore & Atlantic, Duluth Missabe & Northern, Great Northern Railway, Northern Pacific, and the Saint Paul & Duluth.

The main entrance to the building on Michigan Street opened into a "general waiting room" (today known as the Great Hall) which featured a newsstand and a lunch counter. In addition the main floor also boasted a barber shop, a Western Union telegraph office, a smoking room, a ladies' waiting room, and a men's toilet.

A large train shed originally covered the building's platforms, but it was removed in 1924 and replaced by the canopies that remain.

Its last trains in the late 1960s were the Great Northern Railway's Badger and Gopher, both to Minneapolis and St. Paul (later absorbed into the Burlington Northern Railroad) and the Northern Pacific Railway ran local unnamed service to St. Paul and Minneapolis and service to Staples, Minnesota.

The station closed in 1969. It was scheduled for demolition but was purchased from the railroad for the bargain price of $250,000. The edifice was in excellent condition, but renovations still cost $4.7 million.

The building was listed on the National Register of Historic Places as the Duluth Union Depot in 1971 for its state-level significance in the themes of architecture and transportation. It was nominated as a unique example of the era's large railroad terminals and the connection they provided to the rest of the nation.

=== Former Amtrak service ===
While The Depot continued to house its other tenants, Amtrak provided rail service to the station for nearly a decade (1977–1985). In 1975, Amtrak launched the Arrowhead to run from the Great Northern Depot in Minneapolis to Superior, Wisconsin (south of Duluth, just across the Saint Louis Bay of Lake Superior).

Amtrak Thruway service connected Duluth to Superior until 1977, when Arrowhead was extended the 4 miles (6 km) north to the Depot. In 1978, the North Star replaced the Arrowhead and extended the rail service south from Minneapolis–Saint Paul to Chicago, Illinois. The next stop for both Amtrak trains was in Superior. In 1981, service by the North Star was truncated to the Midway Station in Saint Paul. In 1985, Amtrak discontinued the North Star and all passenger rail service to Duluth.

== Current operations ==
=== North Shore Scenic Railroad/Lake Superior Railroad Museum ===
Scenic train rides from the station are provided by the North Shore Scenic Railroad, a heritage railroad operated by the Lake Superior Railroad Museum. Excursions of one to six hours' duration run northeast along Lake Superior's northern shore to destinations that include the Lester River, the area of Palmers, and the city of Two Harbors. The railroad runs other special excursions throughout the year, and may be chartered as well.

=== St. Louis County Historical Society ===
SLCHS exhibits housed in The Depot include Veterans Memorial Hall.

=== Minnesota Ballet ===
The ballet has three rehearsal spaces in The Depot; it mounts occasional events and performances in the building.

=== The Depot Foundation ===
The Depot Foundation is dedicated to preserving The Depot as a forum for the arts, culture and history through managing and growing a permanent endowment.

=== DSSO ===
The Duluth Superior Symphony Orchestra evokes a mixes classically trained musicians with an accessible experience for new and returning guests.

== Proposed rail service ==
In 2011, renovations to the depot were planned to serve the Northern Lights Express Higher-speed rail service from Minneapolis to Duluth. This 155-mile (249 km) project is proposed to roughly follow the route of Amtrak's former North Star and is expected to include stops in Coon Rapids, Isanti, Cambridge, and Hinckley in Minnesota and in Superior.

== See also ==
- National Register of Historic Places listings in St. Louis County, Minnesota
