= Midway station (Minnesota) =

Former Amtrak station in Minnesota

Midway Saint Paul, MN
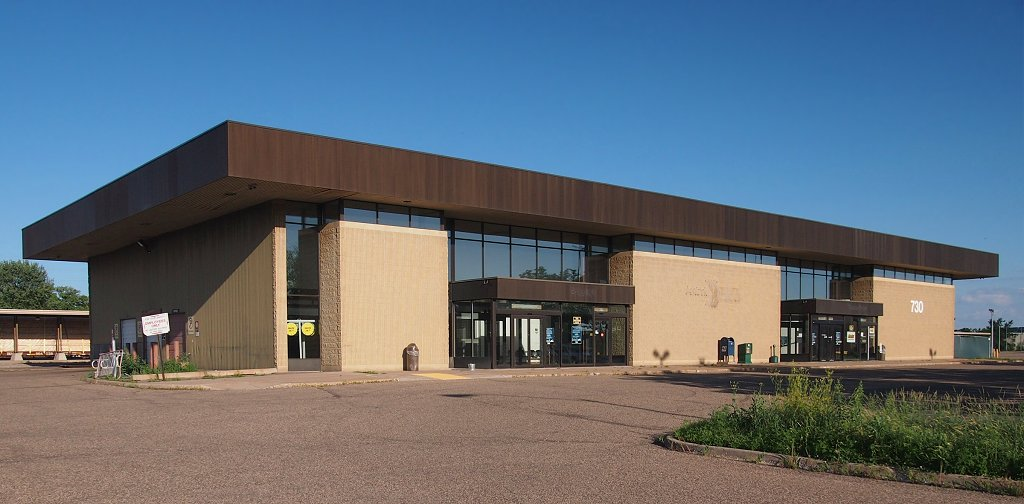
- The station as viewed from the northwest in July 2014

General information
- Location: 730 Transfer Road; Saint Paul, Minnesota 55114; United States
- Coordinates: 44°57′47″N 93°11′05″W
- Elevation: 870 feet (270 m)
- Owner: Amtrak; Minnesota Commercial (some track)
- Platforms: 1 side platform 1 island platform
- Tracks: 3

Other information
- Status: Closed for passenger service
- Station code: MSP (former) (Note: The station code MSP is now used by the Saint Paul Union Depot.)

History
- Opened: March 1, 1978
- Closed: May 7, 2014

Passengers
- FY2013: 116,991 ▼2.92% (Amtrak)

Former services
| Preceding station | Amtrak | Following station |
|---|---|---|
| St. Cloud toward Seattle or Portland | Empire Builder 1979–2014 | Red Wing toward Chicago |
| Willmar toward Seattle | Empire Builder 1978–1979 | Red Wing toward Chicago |
| Cambridge toward Duluth | North Star 1978–1981 | Red Wing toward Chicago |
| Cambridge toward Duluth | North Star 1981–1985 | Terminus |
| Cambridge toward Duluth | Arrowhead 1978–1978 | Terminus |
| Terminus | Twin Cities Hiawatha 1978–1978 | Red Wing toward Chicago |
| St. Cloud toward Seattle | North Coast Hiawatha 1978–1979 | Red Wing toward Chicago |
Location

Midway (Saint Paul/Minneapolis) is a former Amtrak intercity train station in the Midway neighborhood of Saint Paul, Minnesota, United States. It was last served by Amtrak's daily Empire Builder, with service from Chicago, Illinois to Seattle, Washington or Portland, Oregon. When the station opened March 1, 1978, it was also served briefly by the long-distance North Coast Hiawatha (with service from Chicago to Seattle), and the Hiawatha (Chicago to St. Paul) and Arrowhead (Duluth to St. Paul), the latter combined as the North Star (thru service from Chicago to Duluth) later that year.

It was one of the first new stations, designated as a "Type 300A" design, built under the Amtrak Standard Stations Program in 1978. The only other station constructed to "Type 300A" design, Miami station, opened three months later and remains in operation today.

The Midway station was closed for passenger service on May 7, 2014, with passenger service being moved to the restored Saint Paul Union Depot. For a time after its closure the station was still used to service the Empire Builder but was later abandoned. Midway had been a station stop for every Amtrak route in Minnesota until May 2024, when the Borealis began service using Saint Paul Union Depot.

== Description ==
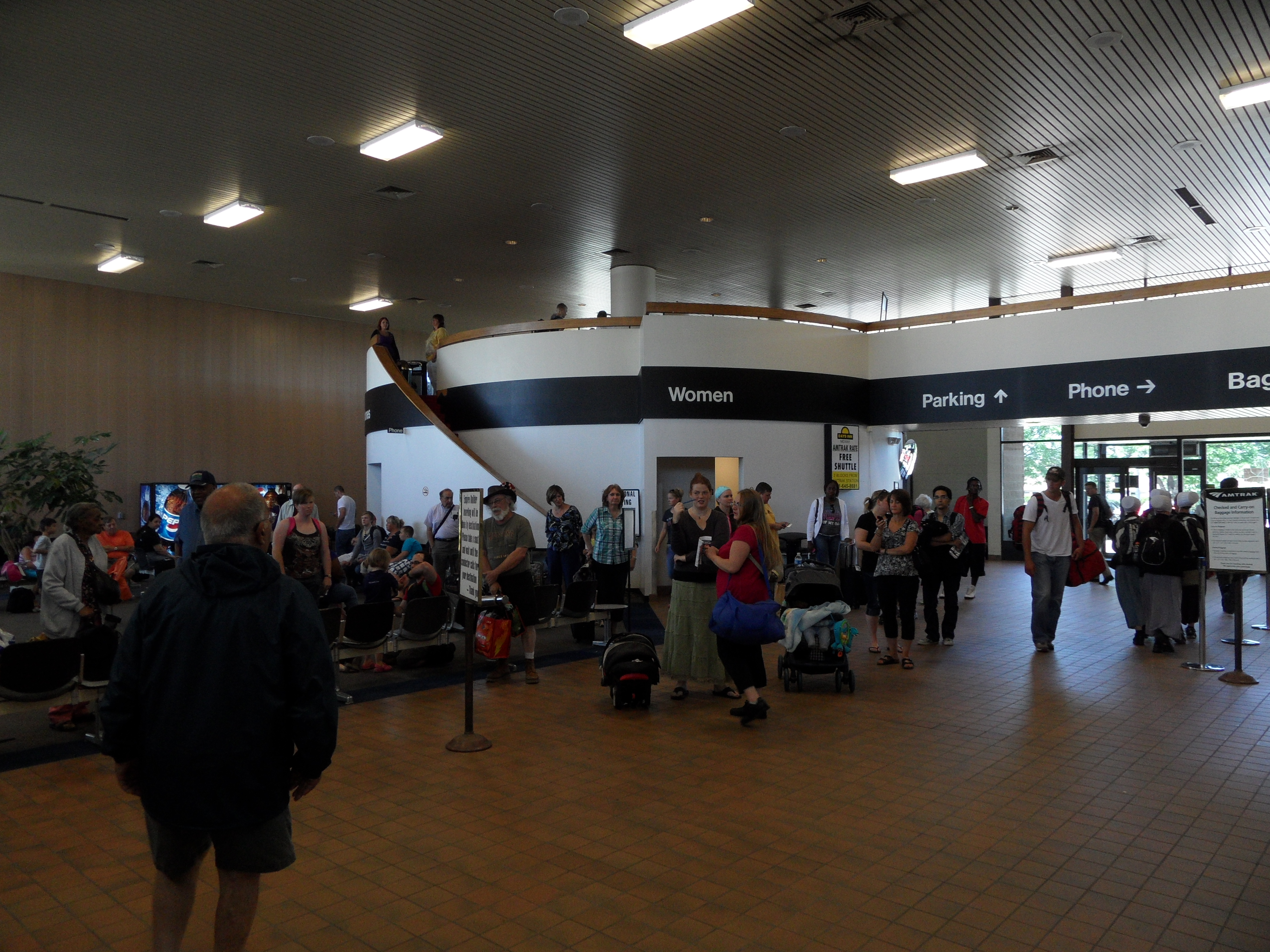
Station waiting area and upstairs lounge, August 2011

The Midway station is located at 730 Transfer Road and is named after the Midway area of Saint Paul. (Note: The Midway area received its name because it is located halfway between Minneapolis and Saint Paul. Moreover, it is also at the midpoint between the North Pole and the Equator.) Its Amtrak station code was MSP and from 1978 to 2014 it served as the only intercity train station for the Minneapolis-Saint Paul metropolitan area. The station can be easily accessed from I‑94/US‑12/US‑52. (Note: To access the Midway station from I‑94/US‑12/US‑52 take the Cretin Avenue North/Vandalia Street interchange (Exit 237) and head northeast on Vandalia Street for about two blocks. Turn right and head southeast on University Avenue West for about another block. Turn left (north) onto Transfer Road and continue for about one more block until the station is reached.) The station has an elevation of 870 feet (270 m).

Prior to closing for passenger service, the station offered an indoor waiting area, ticketing service and a Quik-Trak kiosk, restrooms, payphones, baggage assistance, and checked baggage. Free long and short parking was also available. Station hours were from 6:00 am to 11:45 pm daily.

The station is located next to tracks owned by the Minnesota Commercial Railway and marks a division point between running on the Canadian Pacific Railway (former Milwaukee Road tracks between Chicago and St. Paul) and the BNSF Railway (former Great Northern Railway tracks between Minneapolis and Seattle.) There are two platforms at the station, though the Empire Builder only used the side platform nearest the station building. There is a second island platform that serves two tracks, but it was rarely used. There are also two spurs behind the main platform which are used for storage and display of historic train cars.

Of the six Minnesota stations served by Amtrak, Midway was the busiest for the Fiscal Year 2013 (its last full year of service), boarding or detraining an average of approximately 321 passengers daily (more than twice the ridership all other Minnesota stations combined).

== History ==
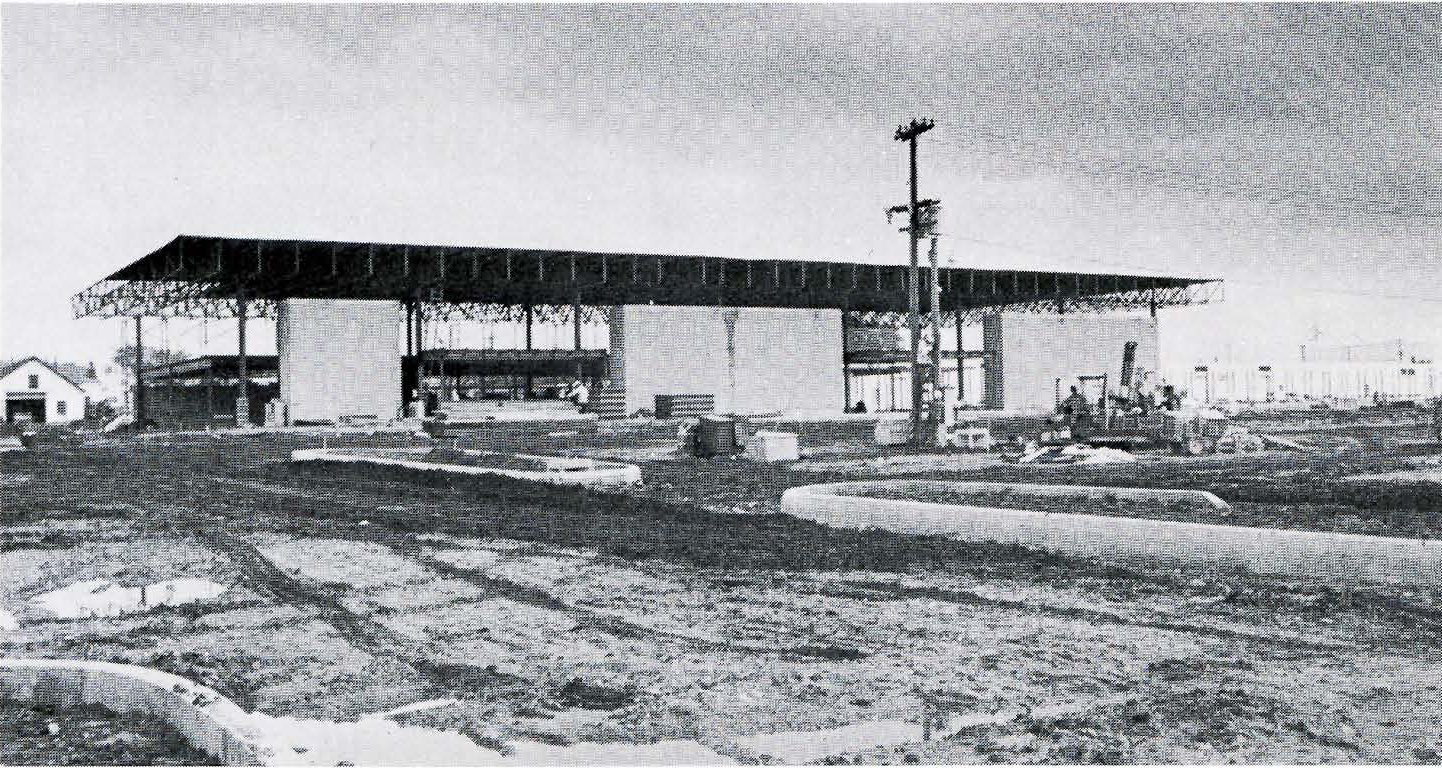
The station under construction, October 1977

When it opened on March 1, 1978, Midway station replaced Minneapolis Great Northern Depot as the sole intercity station in the Twin Cities. Amtrak had opted to consolidate all of its Twin Cities services in Minneapolis when it began operation in 1971, shuttering the Saint Paul Union Depot. The Great Northern Depot was later demolished.

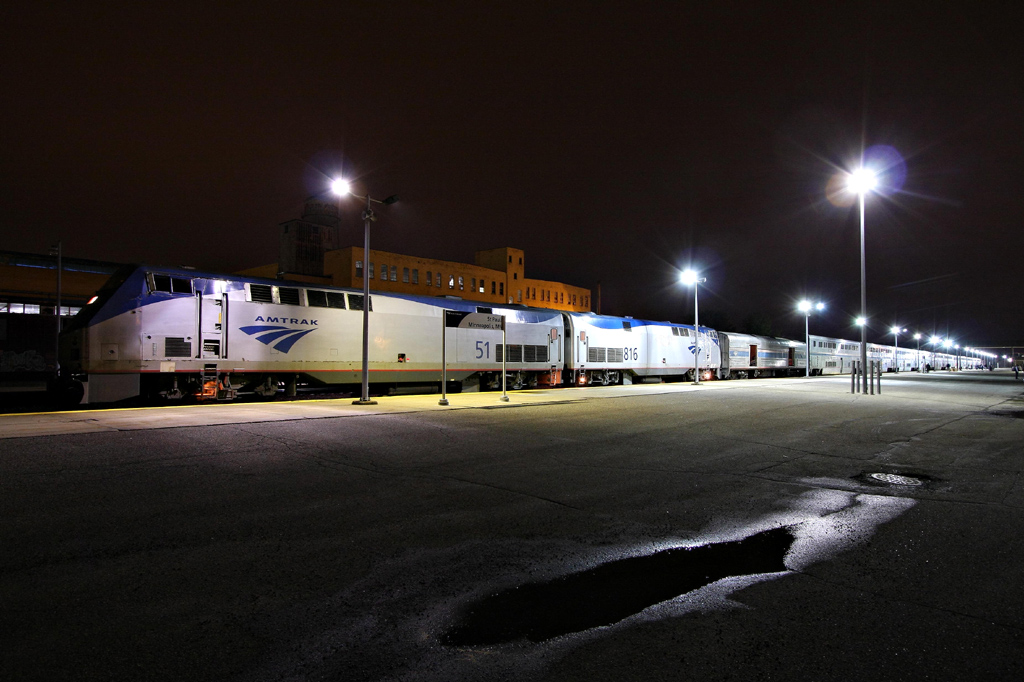
The evening westbound Empire Builder at Midway station, May 2011

The primary rail service at this station for most of its existence was the Empire Builder, named to honor Saint Paul-based mogul James J. Hill who constructed the Great Northern Railway, and whose nickname was "The Empire Builder". Westbound trains head for Spokane, Washington (and then split before continuing on to either Seattle, Washington or Portland, Oregon) while eastbound trains head for Chicago. There were several intermittent stops between. The next westbound stop for the Empire Builder was in St. Cloud and the next eastbound stop was in Red Wing, both in Minnesota. About one-eighth of Empire Builder passengers boarded or arrived at this station.

After opening in 1978, the station briefly served the North Coast Hiawatha until that service ended in 1979. The North Coast Hiawatha ran three times per week from Chicago to Seattle with the next westbound stop having also been in St. Cloud and the next eastbound stop having also been in Red Wing. The station was also served by the North Star with services to Chicago and Duluth, with the stop having been in Cambridge, Minnesota and the next southbound stop having been in Red Wing until serviced was truncated from Chicago to this station in 1981. After the North Star was discontinued in 1985, Amtrak continued service to Duluth with its Amtrak Thruway service until 2022.

On May 7, 2014, Amtrak moved its Twin Cities-area stop to the renovated and reopened Saint Paul Union Depot. After a short time of Midway station being closed to the public, but still serving as a service stop for the Empire Builder, the building was abandoned, ending up on St. Paul's vacant property listings.

=== Future ===
As part of the TCMC project (the Borealis service) the station was noted as being a potential improvement if deemed necessary by Amtrak. Under the proposal the station would be converted to a layover facility, serving as a crew base, light equipment servicing, cleaning, and kitchen. The Borealis started service on May 21, 2024 without using the station.

== Gallery ==
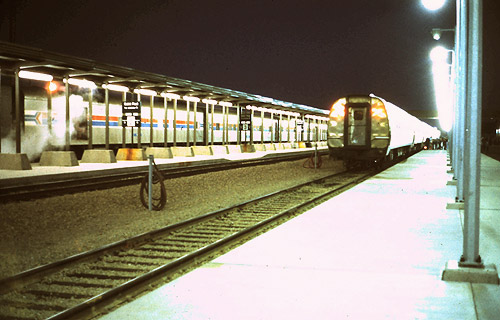
Westbound North Coast Hiawatha (left) and eastbound North Star (right) meet at Midway station, May 1978

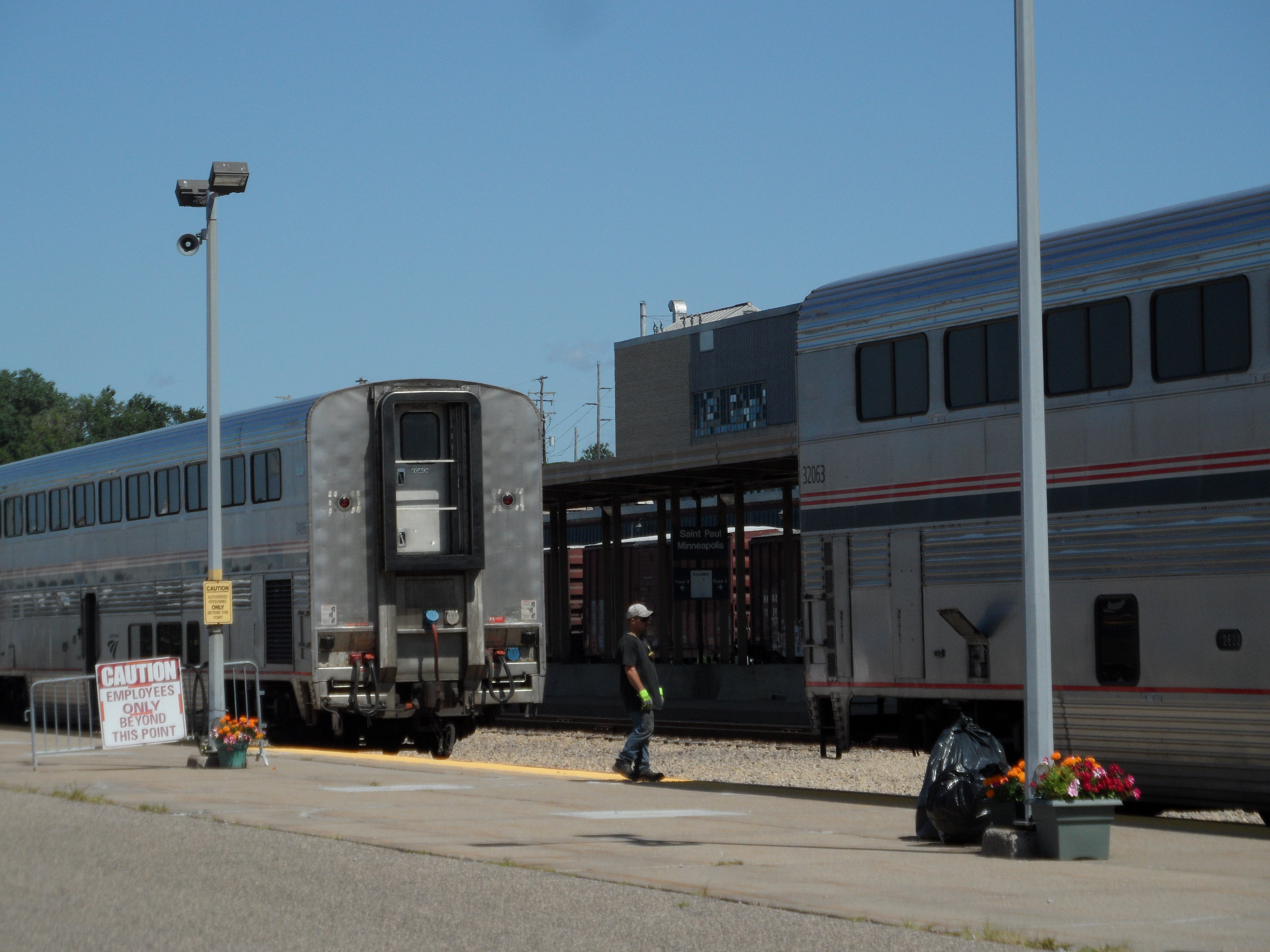
Switching cars en route for the Empire Builder

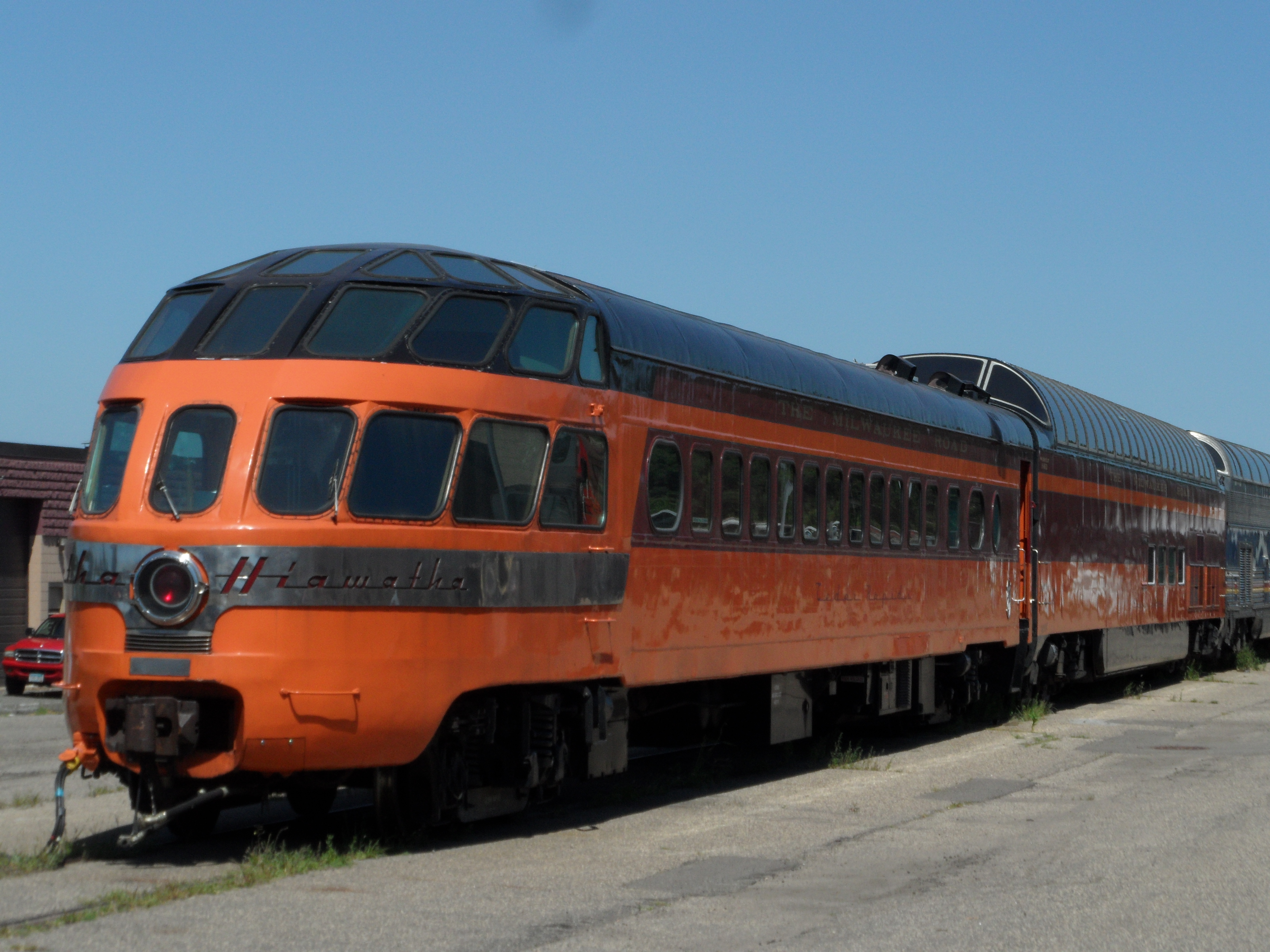
Private railroad cars were conveniently stored on sidings at the station

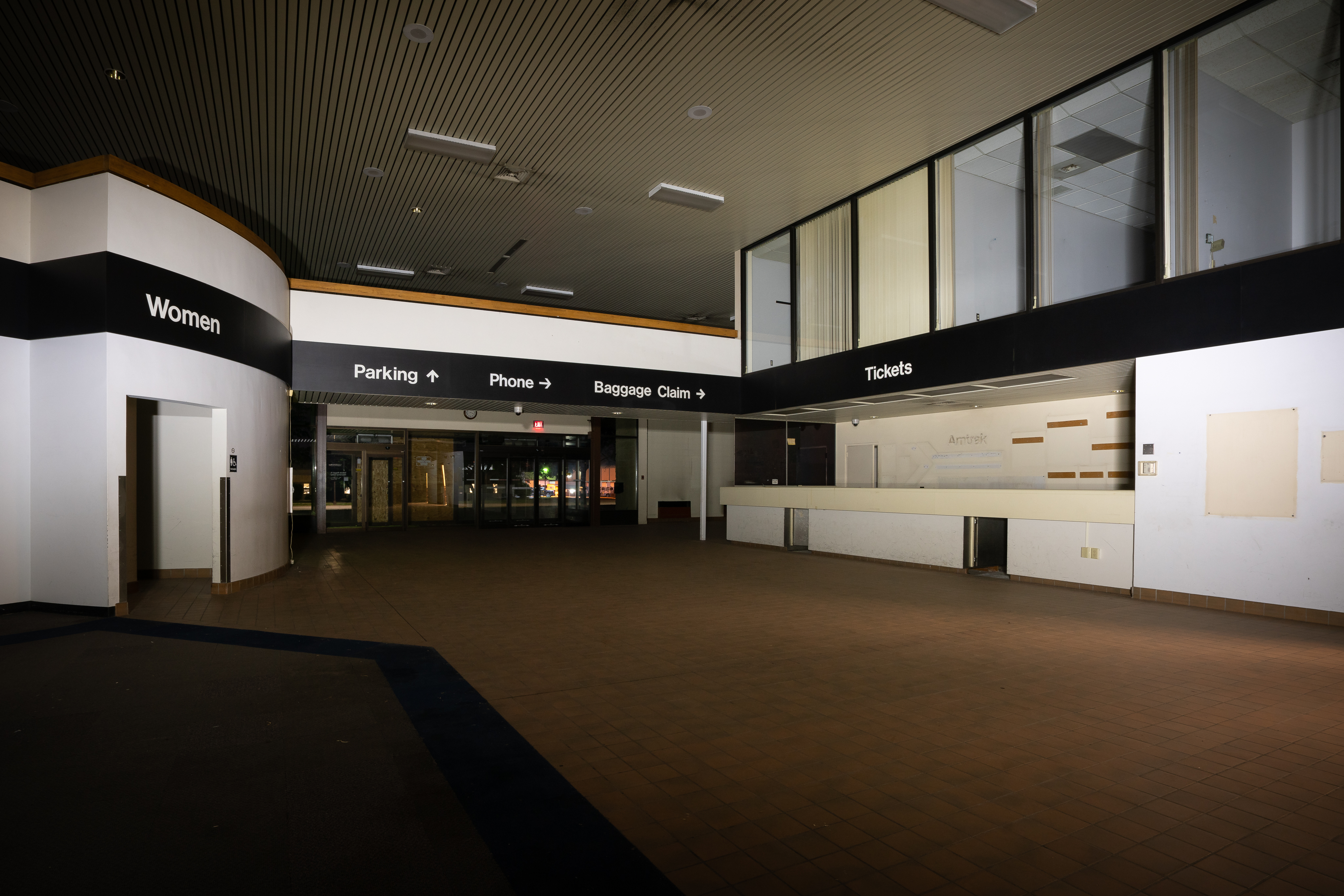
Interior of the abandoned station

== See also ==
- Amtrak
- Chicago, Milwaukee, St. Paul and Pacific Depot Freight House and Train Shed
- Empire Builder
- Minneapolis Great Northern Depot
- North Coast Hiawatha
- North Star (Amtrak train)
- Saint Paul Union Depot
