= Sandstone, Minnesota =

Sandstone
- City
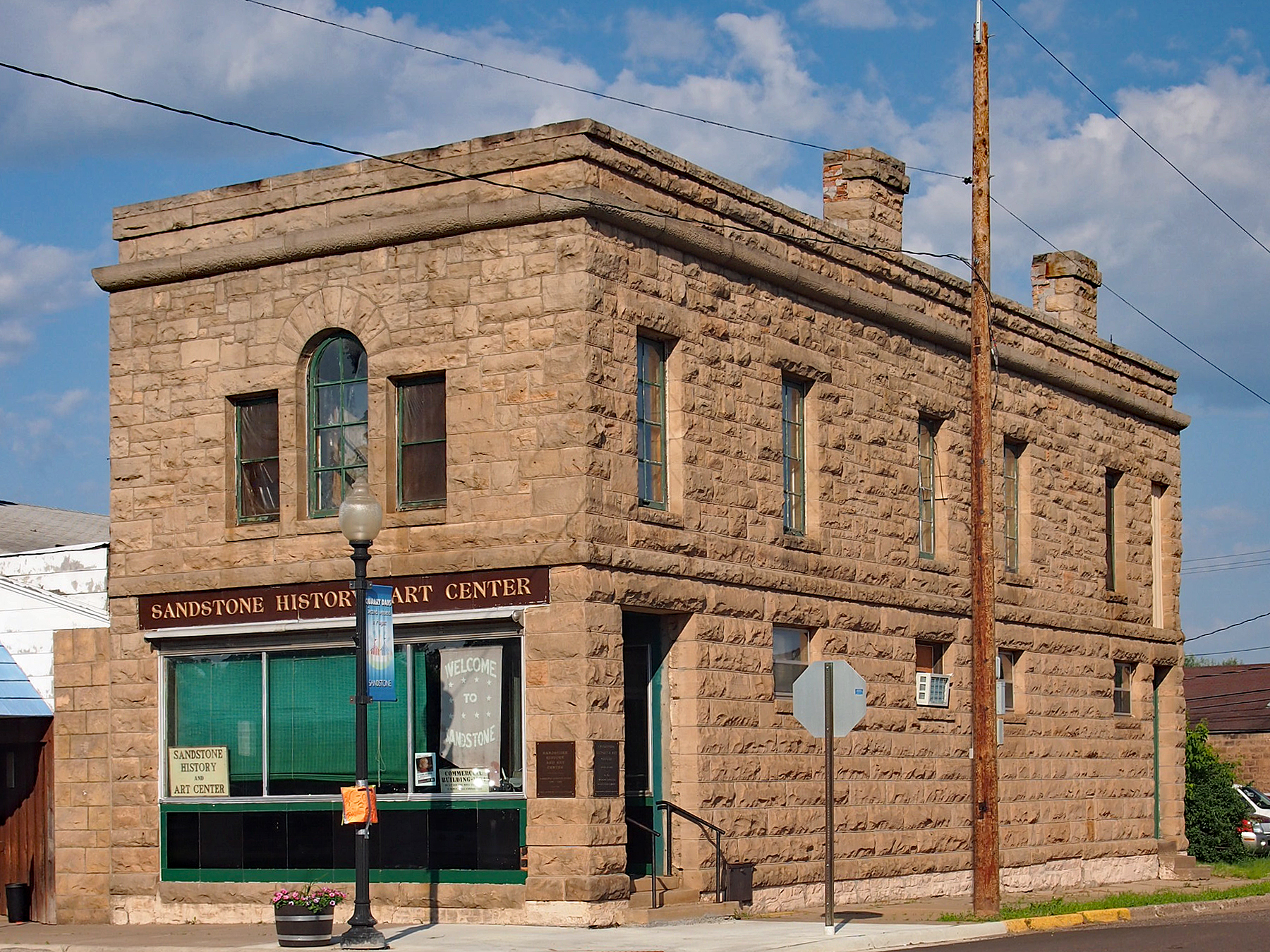
- Minneapolis Trust Company Commercial Building, now the Sandstone History and Art Center

- Logo

- Location of Sandstone within Pine County, Minnesota
- Coordinates: 46°7′45″N 92°51′53″W
- Country: United States
- State: Minnesota
- County: Pine
- Incorporated (village): September 28, 1887
- Incorporated (city): April 14, 1920

Government
  - Mayor: Peter Spartz

Area
  - Total: 5.42 sq mi (14.04 km^{2})
  - Land: 5.25 sq mi (13.61 km^{2})
  - Water: 0.17 sq mi (0.43 km^{2})
- Elevation: 1,076 ft (328 m)

Population (2020)
  - Total: 2,462
  - Density: 468.4/sq mi (180.84/km^{2})
  - Demonym: Sandstonian
- Time zone: UTC-6 (Central (CST))
  - Summer (DST): UTC-5 (CDT)
- ZIP code: 55072
- Area code: 320
- FIPS code: 27-58396
- GNIS feature ID: 2396533
- Website: sandstone.govoffice.com

Sandstone is a city in Pine County, Minnesota, United States, along the Kettle River. The population was 2,462 at the 2020 census.

Interstate 35 and Minnesota State Highways 18 and 23 are three of the main routes in the community.

Banning State Park is located in Sandstone.

== History ==
The Village of Fortuna was platted by Caleb C. Ward and incorporated on May 19, 1857. It was originally platted at the junction of the Point Douglas to Superior Military Road and Kettle River. Fortuna served as the county seat for Buchanan County, Minnesota. By 1887, it had 200 residents. Just north of Fortuna, the Village of Sandstone was platted in June 1887 and incorporated on September 28, 1887. On April 14, 1920, the villages of Fortuna and Sandstone merged and reincorporated as the City of Sandstone.

Sandstone station served Great Northern Railway and Amtrak passenger trains until 1985.

== Geography ==
According to the United States Census Bureau, the city has an area of 5.43 square miles (14.06 km^{2}), of which 5.26 square miles (13.62 km^{2}) is land and 0.17 square miles (0.44 km^{2}) is water.

== Demographics ==
Historical population
Census	Pop.	Note	%±
1890	517		—
1900	1,187		129.6%
1910	1,818		53.2%
1920	1,200		−34.0%
1930	1,083		−9.7%
1940	1,559		44.0%
1950	1,097		−29.6%
1960	1,552		41.5%
1970	1,641		5.7%
1980	1,594		−2.9%
1990	2,057		29.0%
2000	1,549		−24.7%
2010	2,849		83.9%
2020	2,462		−13.6%
U.S. Decennial Census

=== 2020 census ===
As of the 2020 census, Sandstone had a population of 2,462. The median age was 39.5 years. 12.4% of residents were under the age of 18 and 11.9% of residents were 65 years of age or older. For every 100 females there were 230.0 males, and for every 100 females age 18 and over there were 266.2 males age 18 and over.

0.0% of residents lived in urban areas, while 100.0% lived in rural areas.

There were 572 households in Sandstone, of which 29.4% had children under the age of 18 living in them. Of all households, 31.1% were married-couple households, 20.5% were households with a male householder and no spouse or partner present, and 38.8% were households with a female householder and no spouse or partner present. About 36.1% of all households were made up of individuals and 18.5% had someone living alone who was 65 years of age or older.

There were 634 housing units, of which 9.8% were vacant. The homeowner vacancy rate was 2.3% and the rental vacancy rate was 7.4%.

Racial composition as of the 2020 census
Race	Number	Percent
White	1,888	76.7%
Black or African American	294	11.9%
American Indian and Alaska Native	132	5.4%
Asian	29	1.2%
Native Hawaiian and Other Pacific Islander	0	0.0%
Some other race	22	0.9%
Two or more races	97	3.9%
Hispanic or Latino (of any race)	198	8.0%

=== 2010 census ===
As of the census of 2010, there were 2,849 people, 602 households, and 362 families living in the city. The population density was 541.6 inhabitants per square mile (209.1/km^{2}). There were 652 housing units at an average density of 124.0 per square mile (47.9/km^{2}). The racial makeup of the city was 71.5% White, 15.5% African American, 5.7% Native American, 0.6% Asian, 0.1% Pacific Islander, 3.6% from other races, and 2.9% from two or more races. Hispanic or Latino of any race were 11.0% of the population.

There were 602 households, of which 36.5% had children under the age of 18 living with them, 31.9% were married couples living together, 21.3% had a female householder with no husband present, 7.0% had a male householder with no wife present, and 39.9% were non-families. 33.2% of all households were made up of individuals, and 17.8% had someone living alone who was 65 years of age or older. The average household size was 2.42 and the average family size was 2.94.

The median age in the city was 34.9 years. 14.6% of residents were under the age of 18; 9.2% were between the ages of 18 and 24; 46.1% were from 25 to 44; 20.2% were from 45 to 64; and 9.8% were 65 years of age or older. The gender makeup of the city was 71.0% male and 29.0% female.

=== 2000 census ===
As of the census of 2000, there were 1,549 people, 580 households, and 359 families living in the city. The population density was 292.5 inhabitants per square mile (112.9/km^{2}). There were 634 housing units at an average density of 119.7 per square mile (46.2/km^{2}). The racial makeup of the city was 94.84% White, 0.39% African American, 3.55% Native American, 0.32% Asian, 0.06% Pacific Islander, 0.39% from other races, and 0.45% from two or more races. Hispanic or Latino of any race were 1.42% of the population.

There were 580 households, out of which 30.3% had children under the age of 18 living with them, 44.5% were married couples living together, 13.4% had a female householder with no husband present, and 38.1% were non-families. 32.1% of all households were made up of individuals, and 16.4% had someone living alone who was 65 years of age or older. The average household size was 2.41 and the average family size was 3.03.

In the city, the population was spread out, with 24.9% under the age of 18, 8.0% from 18 to 24, 25.7% from 25 to 44, 17.4% from 45 to 64, and 24.0% who were 65 years of age or older. The median age was 38 years. For every 100 females, there were 79.1 males. For every 100 females age 18 and over, there were 73.6 males.

The median income for a household in the city was $40,265, and the median income for a family was $43,684. Males had a median income of $32,500 versus $21,181 for females. The per capita income for the city was $18,053. About 11.6% of families and 16.7% of the population were below the poverty line, including 24.4% of those under age 18 and 13.9% of those age 65 or over.

== Economy ==
A Federal Correctional Institution rated for low-security federal inmates is in Sandstone.

== Arts and culture ==
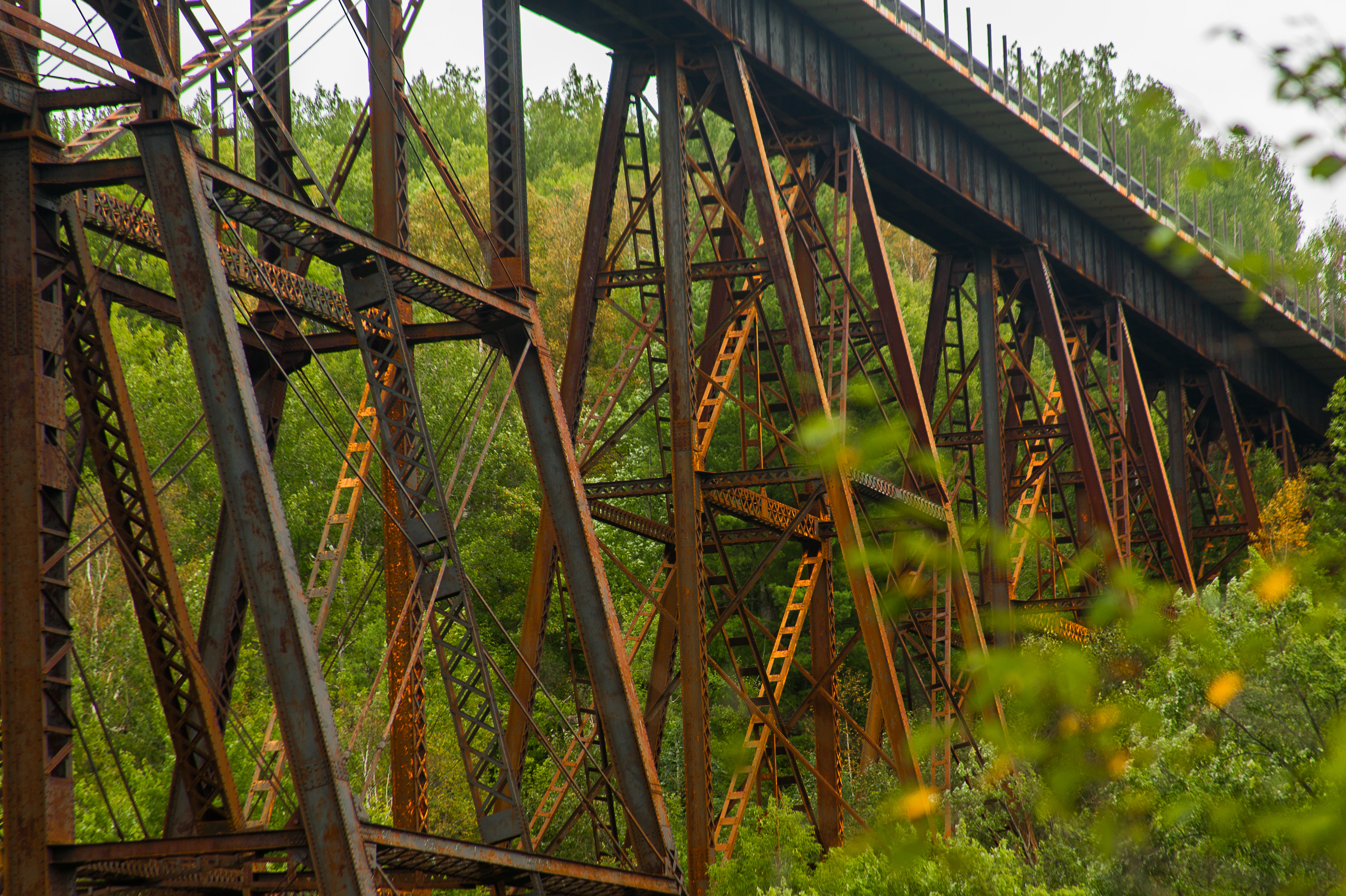
High trestle carrying the BNSF Hinckley Subdivision over the Kettle River in Sandstone

Sandstone is on the Kettle River, known for its glacial kettles used by kayakers and canoeists. The town was built up around a large sandstone quarry. Railroad magnate James J. Hill built many of the sandstone structures in the town.

The Sandstone Ice Festival features ice climbing, winter camping and snow shoeing.

The Kettle River Paddle Festival features canoing and kayaking.

Midwest Country theater/TV show is located here.

== Parks and recreation ==
The city has Robinson Park, a historic and natural area that serves as a picnic area, sport-climbing and bouldering crag, hosts ice climbing in the winter, preserves the Sandstone Quarry history, and is an access point for the Kettle River.

== Education ==
The area is served by East Central Schools.

== Infrastructure ==
Highways include:

- Interstate Highway 35
- Minnesota Highway 18
- Minnesota Highway 23
- Minnesota Highway 123

== Notable people ==
- Doug Carlson (1939–2013), Minnesota state representative
- William S. Ervin (1886–1951), attorney general of Minnesota
- Yonassan Gershom (born 1947), rabbi and author, early proponent of the Jewish Renewal movement
