= Minneapolis Great Northern Depot =

Demolished train station in Minnesota

Great Northern Depot
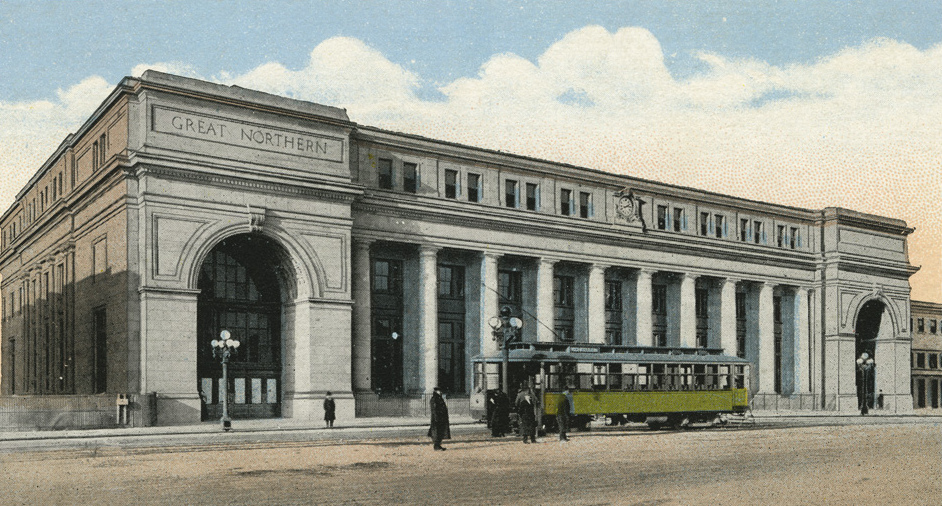
- Minneapolis Great Northern Depot shortly after its opening in 1913

General information
- Location: 90 Hennepin Avenue; United States
- Coordinates: 44°59′05″N 93°15′59″W
- Owner: Burlington Northern Railroad
- Line: Great Northern Railway
- Platforms: 7 island platforms
- Tracks: 12 (former)

Other information
- Station code: MIN (former)

History
- Opened: 1914
- Closed: 1978

Former services
| Preceding station | Amtrak | Following station |
|---|---|---|
| Cambridge toward Duluth | Arrowhead | Terminus |
| Willmar toward Seattle | Empire Builder | Red Wing toward Chicago |
| Terminus | Twin Cities Hiawatha | Red Wing toward Chicago |
| St. Cloud toward Seattle | North Coast Hiawatha | Red Wing toward Chicago |
| Preceding station | Burlington Route | Following station |
| Terminus | Minneapolis – Chicago | St. Paul toward Chicago |
| Preceding station | Chicago and North Western Railway | Following station |
| Terminus | Chicago – Minneapolis via Milwaukee | St. Paul toward Chicago |
| Terminus | Chicago – Minneapolis via Madison | St. Paul toward Chicago |
| Terminus | Minneapolis – Ashland | St. Paul toward Ashland |
| St. Paul toward Omaha | Omaha – Minneapolis | Terminus |
| Preceding station | Chicago Great Western Railway | Following station |
| St. Paul toward Kansas City | Main Line | Terminus |
| Preceding station | Great Northern Railway | Following station |
| Wayzata toward Seattle | Main Line via Willmar | St. Paul Terminus |
| Robbinsdale toward Seattle | Main Line via St. Cloud | St. Paul Terminus |
| St. Paul Terminus | St. Paul – Duluth | Coon Creek Junction toward Duluth |
| Wayzata toward Hutchinson | Hutchinson – Minneapolis | Terminus |
| Fridley toward Milaca | Milaca – Minneapolis | Terminus |
| Preceding station | Northern Pacific Railway | Following station |
| Coon Creek toward Seattle or Tacoma | Main Line | St. Paul Terminus |
| Terminus | Minneapolis – Duluth | St. Paul toward Duluth |
| Elk River toward Winnipeg | Winnipeg – St. Paul | St. Paul Terminus |
Location
- Location within Minnesota Location within the United States

The Minneapolis Great Northern Depot, also known as Great Northern Station, was a passenger railroad station which served Minneapolis, Minnesota, USA. It was built in 1913 and demolished in 1978. It was located on Hennepin Avenue next to the Hennepin Avenue Bridge and across the street from the main Minneapolis Post Office.

== History ==
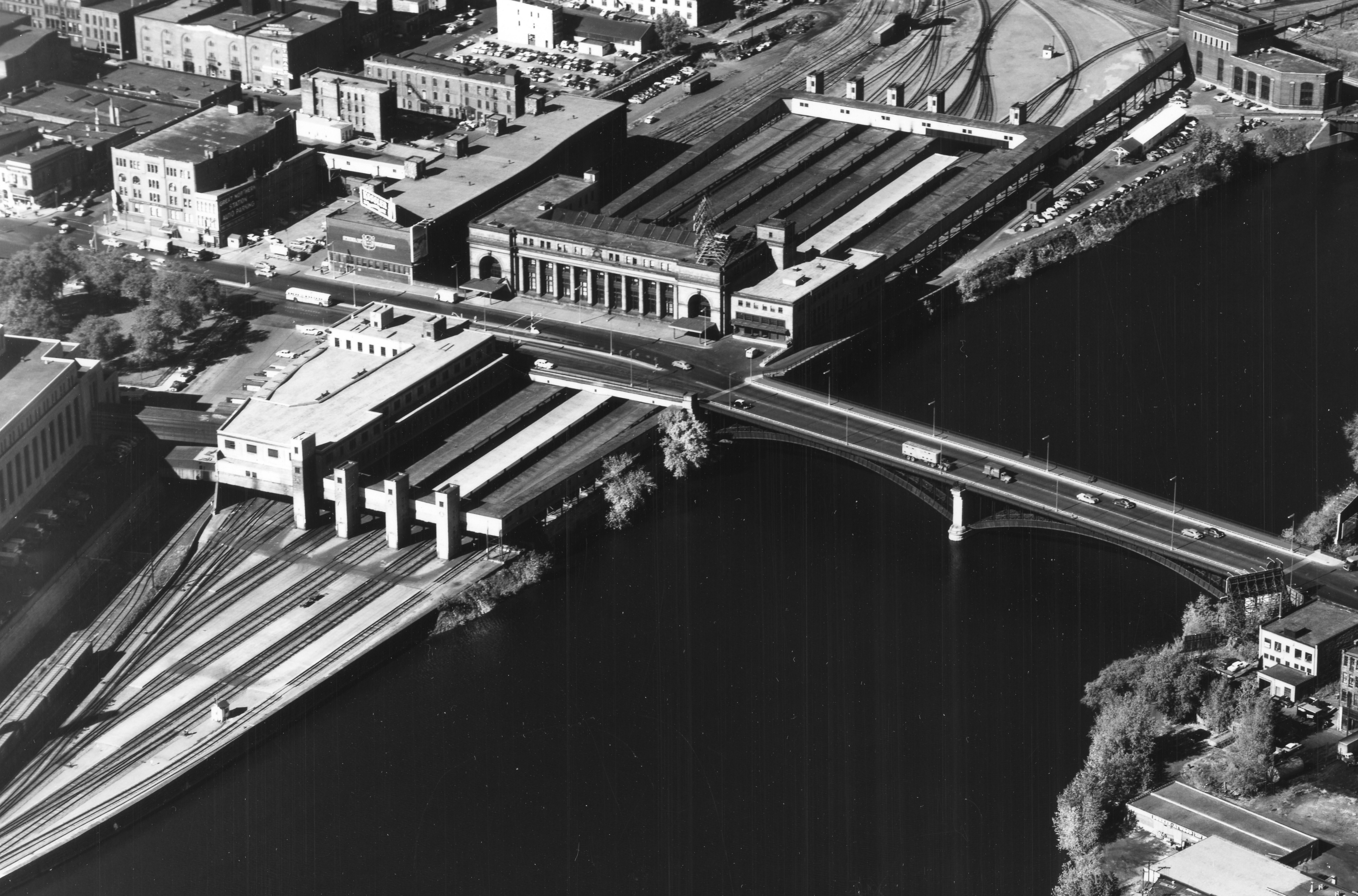
An aerial photograph of the depot in the 1950s

The station was sometimes called the Minneapolis Union Depot, which actually was the name of the previous station on the opposite side of Hennepin Avenue that had been in use for 30 years. The older Union Depot was razed; today, that site is used for loading docks by the central downtown Minneapolis Post Office. The Stone Arch Bridge was built to serve the original Minneapolis Union Depot, but later provided access to the Great Northern Depot. The Minneapolis BNSF Rail Bridge, an older crossing of the Mississippi River to the north, also served the depot with a cutoff track located on the bridge.

The Minneapolis Great Northern Depot was built to serve the railroad empire of James J. Hill. It was constructed at the height of the City Beautiful movement, at a time when Minneapolis was striving to revive the decaying Bridge Square area. The building was designed by Charles Sumner Frost, who had earlier designed the Chicago, Milwaukee, St. Paul and Pacific Depot Freight House and Train Shed, and then later the Saint Paul Union Depot. Frost had also supervised the construction of the Navy Pier in Chicago and the Maine State Building at the Columbian Exposition of 1893.

The Depot was constructed of brick and reinforced concrete. It was faced with light Kettle River sandstone. It was designed in a Beaux-Arts style with a Doric colonnade facing Hennepin Avenue. The train tracks ran Northwest–Southeast along the Mississippi river, under Hennepin Avenue and into a pass-through train shed.

=== Demise and reuse of the depot site ===
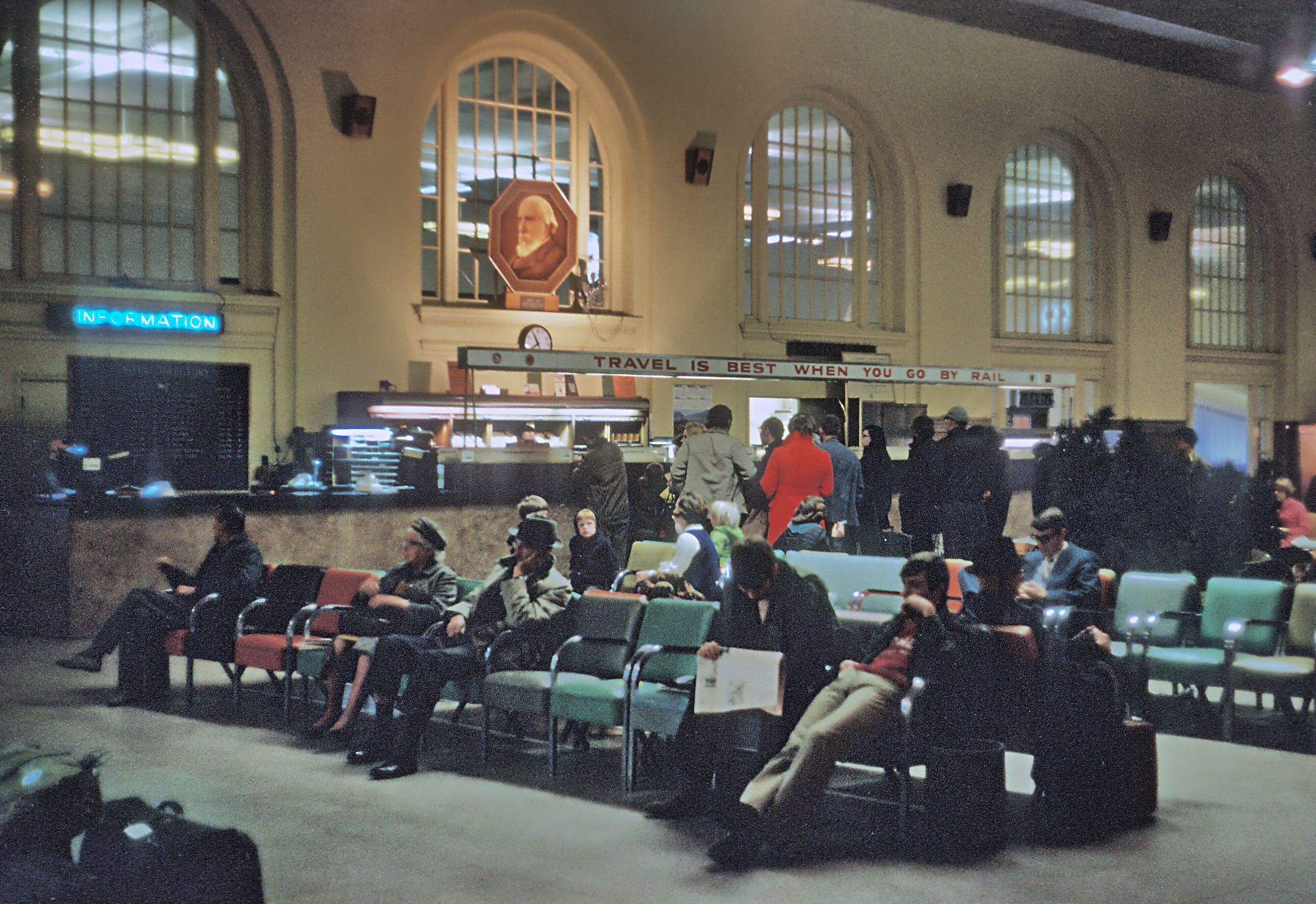
Passengers waiting at Minneapolis Great Northern Depot in April 1971

Passenger train service through the depot declined from a peak of 125 daily trains during World War II to just one route when Amtrak began operation in 1971—the Empire Builder. Amtrak opted to consolidate all of its Twin Cities service at the Great Northern Depot, shuttering St. Paul's Union Depot.

Traffic rebounded very slightly in the following years, as the Arrowhead, North Coast Hiawatha, and Twin Cities Hiawatha entered service, though these sometimes operated as combined trains from Chicago or only served the depot on alternating days. The trains continued to stop at the depot until the Midway station opened in Saint Paul, roughly halfway between downtown Minneapolis and downtown St. Paul, in 1978.

The Great Northern Depot was demolished later that year. The area lay vacant and was adjacent to the Berman Buckskin building and the Chicago Great Western railway freight warehouse. All these buildings were torn down to make way for development; the site is occupied by the third and current Federal Reserve Bank of Minneapolis building. The new Target Field station for the Metro light rail line and Northstar commuter rail line was constructed at the site of Target Field along BNSF Railway's Wayzata Subdivision. It is located five blocks west and two blocks north of the former depot.

== Trains ==
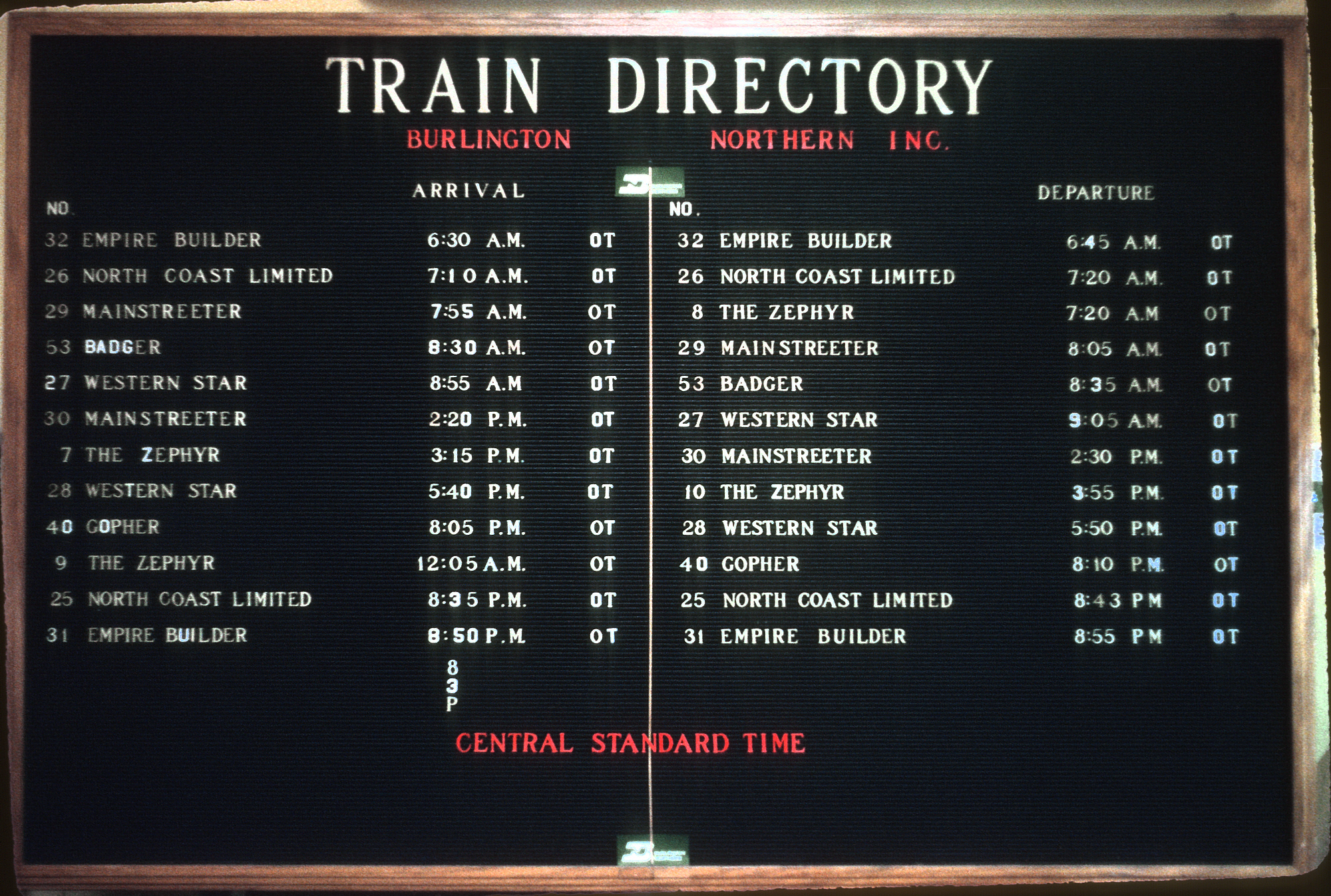
Arrivals and departures at Minneapolis Great Northern Depot in April 1971, weeks before Amtrak's takeover of all passenger operations at the station.

It was the destination for trains of several railroads that served Minneapolis, including,

- Chicago, Burlington and Quincy Railroad (Burlington)
- Chicago and North Western Railway (Omaha Road)
- Chicago Great Western Railway
- Great Northern Railway
- Northern Pacific Railway

The named trains Great Northern Empire Builder, Chicago, Burlington and Quincy Twin Cities Zephyr, Chicago and North Western Twin Cities 400, and Northern Pacific North Coast Limited either passed through or terminated at the Depot.

== Other train depots in Minneapolis and Saint Paul ==
=== Extant ===
- Chicago, Milwaukee, St. Paul and Pacific Depot Freight House and Train Shed – Former Minneapolis destination for Milwaukee Road, Soo Line, and Rock Island passenger trains.
- Midway station – Former passenger station serving the Twin Cities.
- Minnehaha Depot – Located near Minnehaha Falls at Minnehaha Park. Depot is owned by the Minnesota Historical Society and staffed by the Minnesota Transportation Museum.
- Saint Paul Union Depot – Former and current St. Paul passenger train destination, recently restored.

=== Demolished ===
The following railroad depots that once existed in Minneapolis have been demolished.

- Chicago Great Western Railway Depot – located on South Washington Avenue at 10th avenue South. The location was a parking lot for many years, and is now redeveloped into high density residential blocks.
- Chicago Great Western Freight Station was adjacent to the Great Northern Depot, also on the North side of Hennepin Avenue.
- Minneapolis and St. Louis Railway Station – located at the Southeast corner of 4th street North and Washington Avenue North, currently a parking lot.
- Electric Short Line Railway (Luce Line) Depot, shared with the Minneapolis, St. Paul, Rochester and Dubuque Electric Traction Company, (known as the Dan Patch Line and later the Minneapolis, Northfield and Southern Railway) as well as the Minneapolis, Anoka and Cuyuna Range Interurban railway. It was located at the Northwest corner of 7th St. North and 3rd Avenue North, now Target Field.
- Minneapolis Union Depot – the predecessor to the Great Northern Depot, located on the South side of Hennepin Avenue next to the Mississippi river, currently green space between the bridge and Minneapolis Central post office.
