= Saint Paul Union Depot =

Train station in Saint Paul, Minnesota

Union Depot Saint Paul, MN
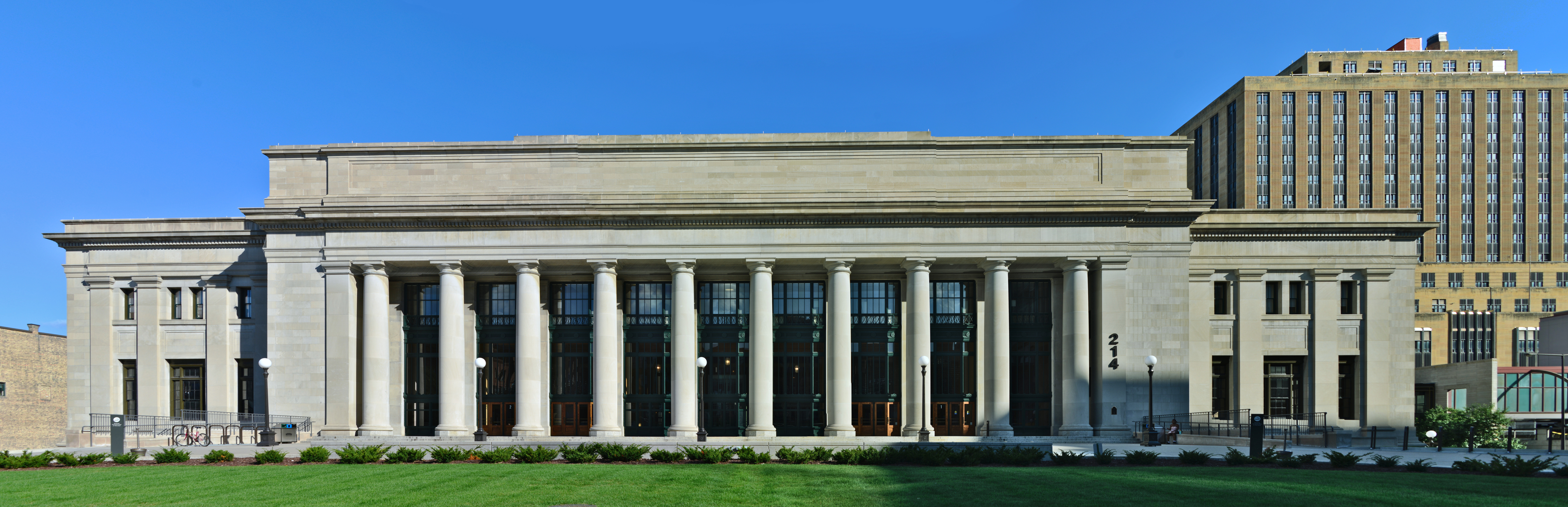
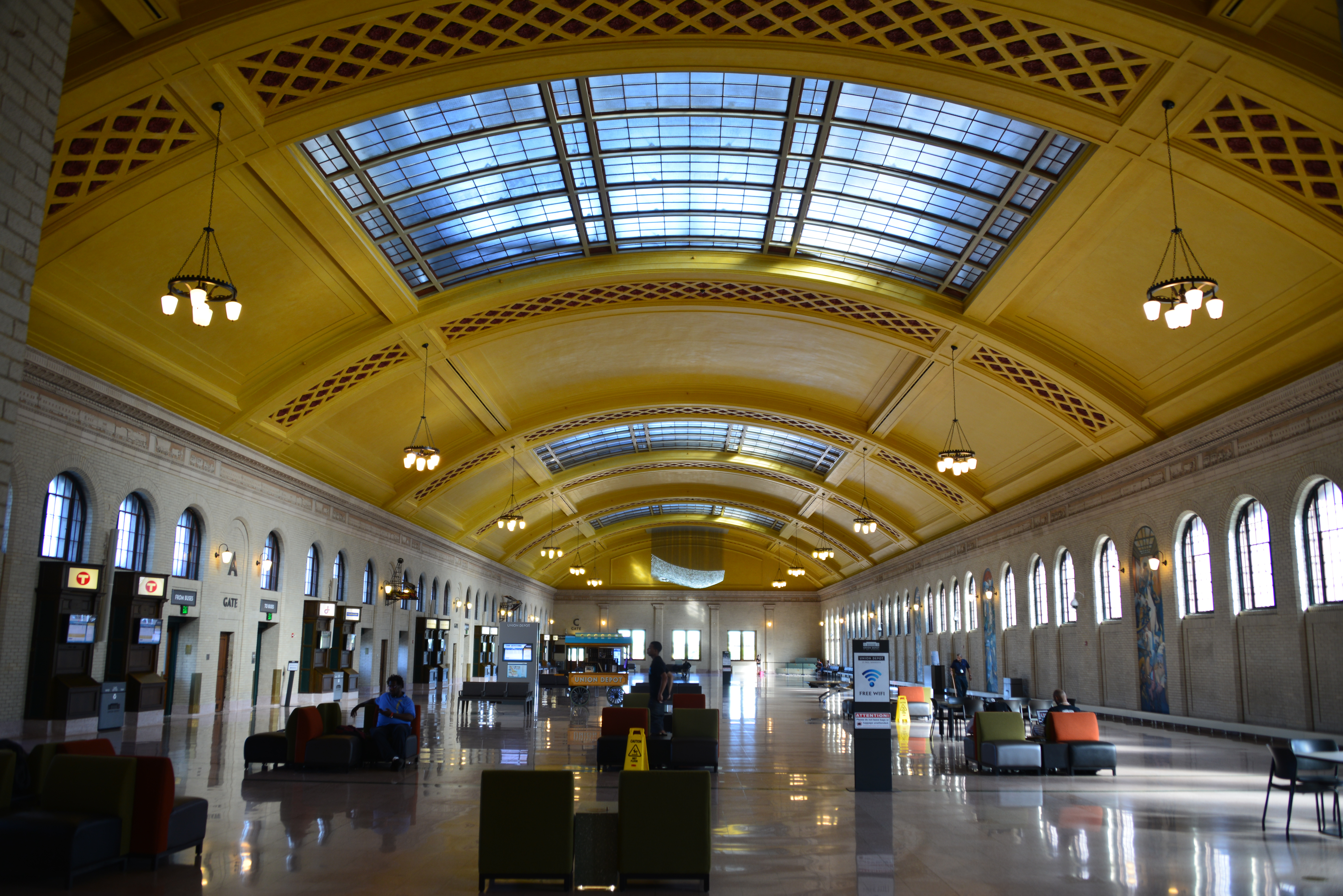
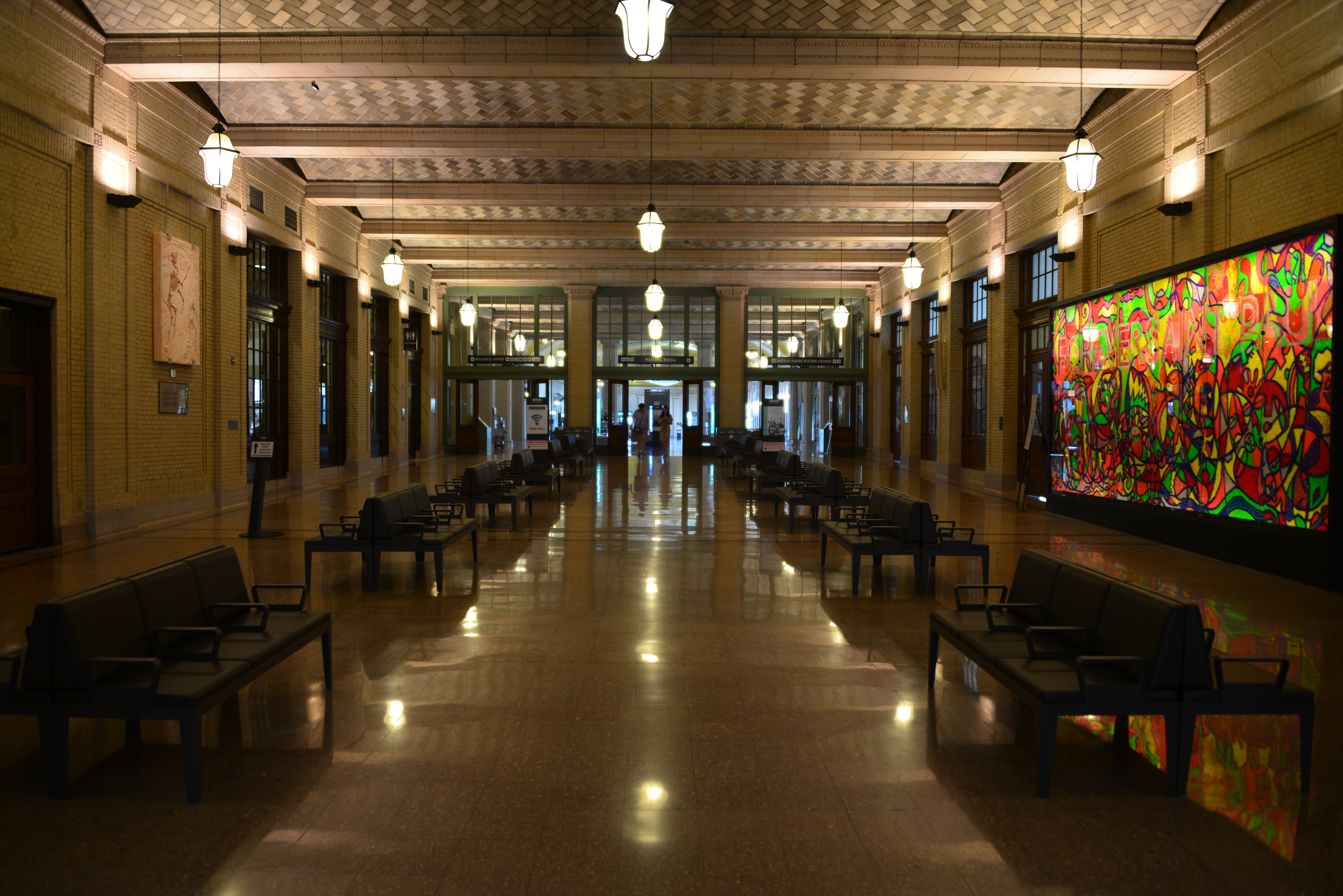
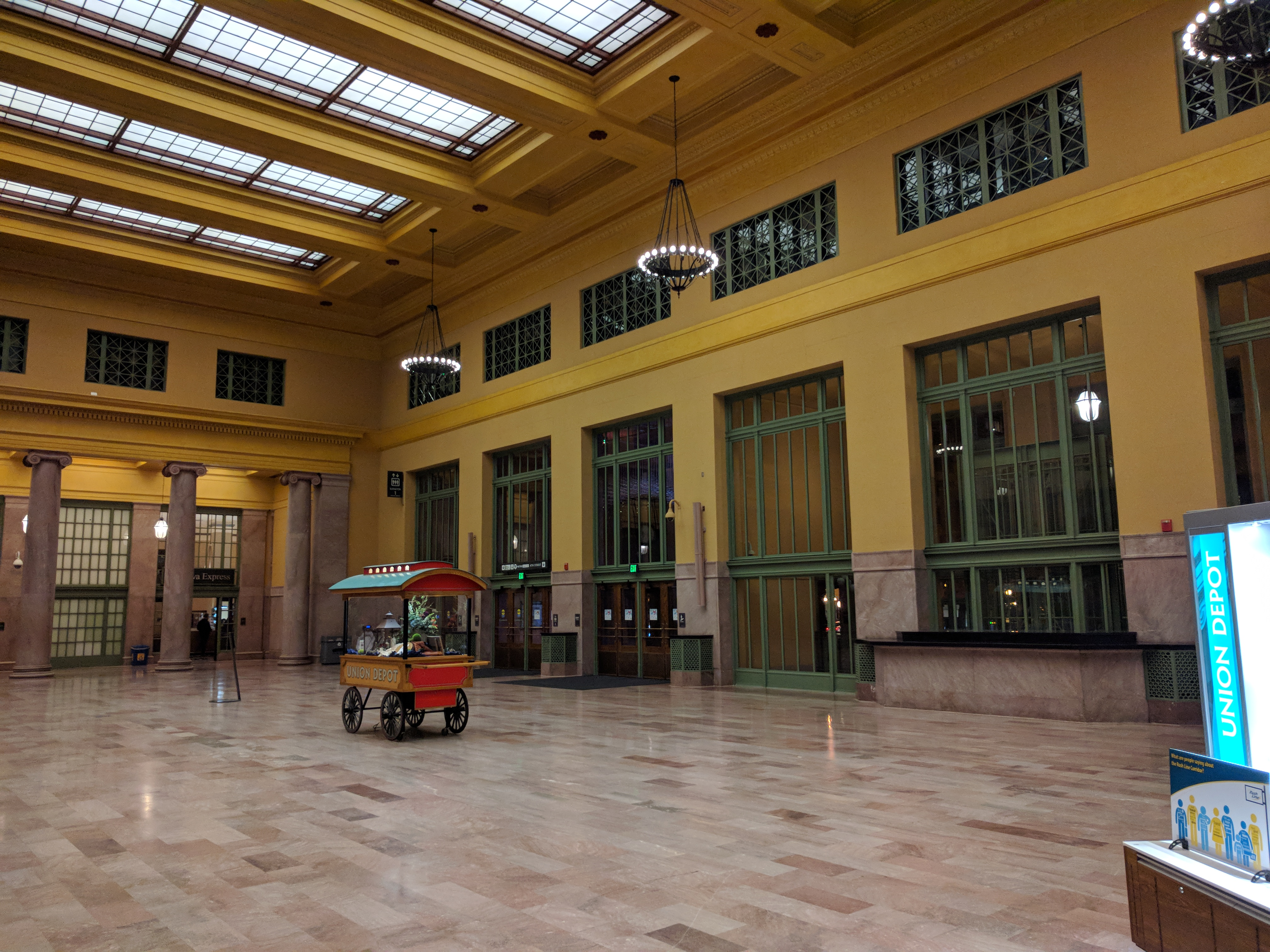
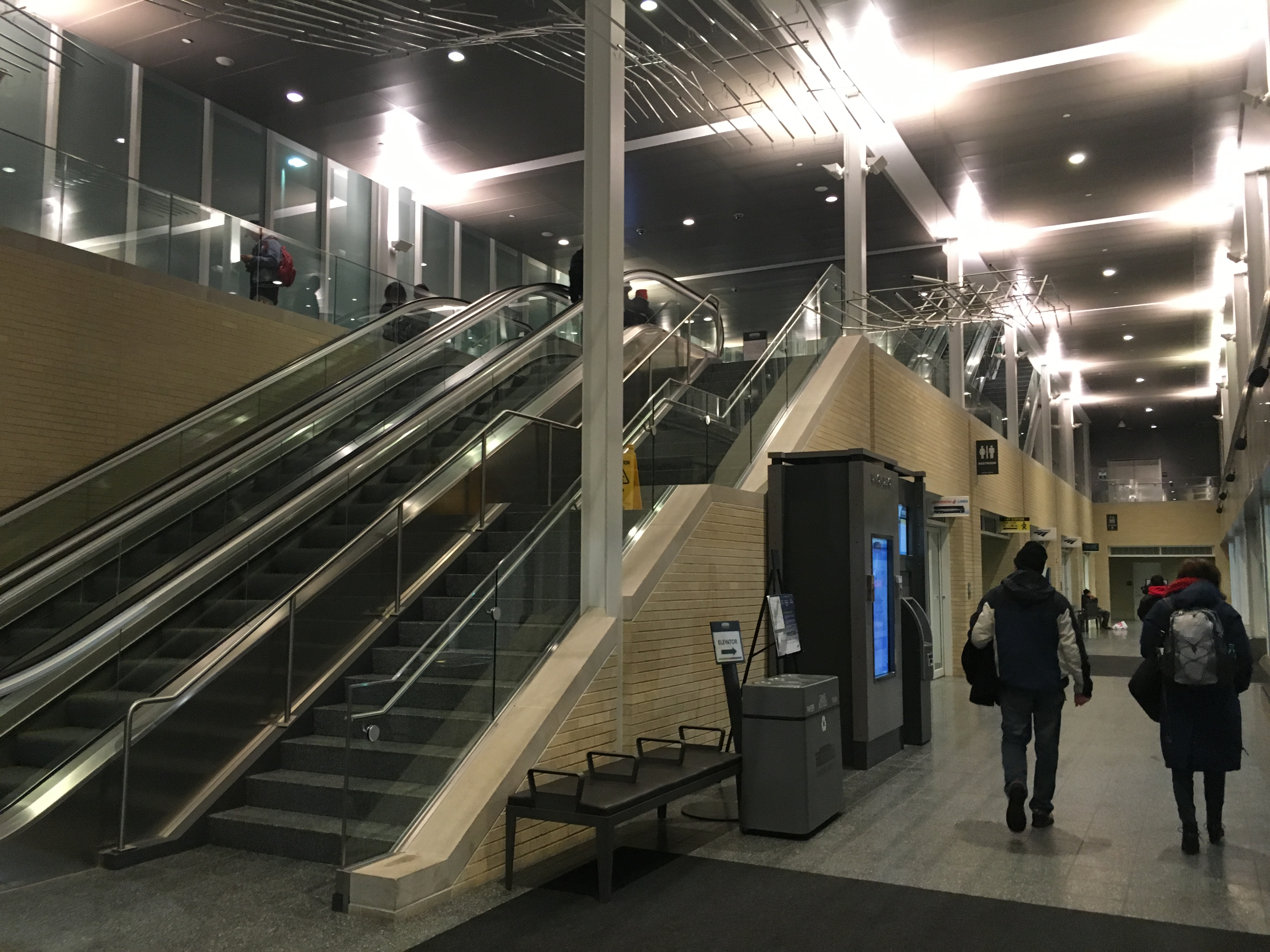
- Left to right from top:facade of the head house, waiting room, concourse, inside of the headhouse, Entrance from lower parking ramp with ticket stations for Jefferson Lines and Amtrak

General information
- Location: 214 Fourth Street East; Saint Paul, Minnesota; United States
- Coordinates: 44°56′52″N 93°5′10″W
- Owner: Ramsey County Regional Railroad Authority
- Operator: Jones Lang LaSalle
- Line: CPKC Merriam Park Subdivision
- Platforms: 9 historically 3 currently
- Tracks: 18 historically 2 currently
- Bus routes: Metro Transit: 3, 54, 63, 72, 94, 262, 350, 361, 364, 417; Minnesota Valley Transit Authority: 480, 484, 489
- Bus stands: 6
- Bus operators: Metro Transit; Minnesota Valley Transit Authority; Jefferson Lines; Greyhound Lines; Megabus

Construction
- Parking: 12 short-term spaces; 1,000 long-term spaces
- Cycle facilities: Yes
- Accessible: Yes

Other information
- Station code: Amtrak: MSP
- Website: uniondepot.org

History
- Opened: Original depot: 1881; Current structure: 1923
- Rebuilt: 2011

Passengers
- FY 2025: 199,613 (Amtrak)
- 2025: 1,047 daily ▼6.6% (LRT)
- Rank: 18 out of 37
- 2025: 274 daily (BRT)
- Rank: 44 out of 129

Services
Preceding station	Amtrak	Following station
Terminus	Borealis	Red Wing toward Chicago
St. Cloud toward Seattle or Portland	Empire Builder	Red Wing toward Chicago
Preceding station	Metro	Following station
Central toward Target Field	Green Line	Terminus
6th Street & Jackson toward Lake & France	B Line	Terminus
5th Street & Robert One-way operation	B Line	Terminus
Former services
Preceding station	Burlington Route	Following station
Minneapolis Terminus	Minneapolis – Chicago	St. Paul Park toward Chicago
Preceding station	Chicago and North Western Railway	Following station
Minneapolis Terminus	Chicago – Minneapolis via Milwaukee	Lake Elmo toward Chicago
Minneapolis Terminus	Chicago – Minneapolis via Madison	Lake Elmo toward Chicago
Minneapolis Terminus	Minneapolis – Ashland	Lake Elmo toward Ashland
Mendota, MN toward Omaha	Omaha – Minneapolis	Minneapolis Terminus
Preceding station	Chicago Great Western Railway	Following station
South St. Paul toward Kansas City	Main Line	Minneapolis Terminus
Preceding station	Chicago, Rock Island and Pacific Railroad	Following station
Rosemount toward Teague	Teague – Minneapolis	Minneapolis Terminus
Minneapolis Terminus	Burlington, Cedar Rapids and Northern Railway	Rosemount toward Burlington
Preceding station	Great Northern Railway	Following station
Minneapolis toward Seattle	Main Line	Terminus
Terminus	St. Paul – Duluth	Minneapolis toward Duluth
Preceding station	Milwaukee Road	Following station
Minneapolis toward Seattle or Tacoma	Main Line	Langdon toward Chicago
Minneapolis Terminus	Minneapolis – Calmar	Mendota toward Calmar
Preceding station	Northern Pacific Railway	Following station
Minneapolis toward Seattle or Tacoma	Main Line	Terminus
Minneapolis toward Winnipeg	Winnipeg – St. Paul	Terminus
Minneapolis Terminus	Minneapolis – Duluth	Gloster toward Duluth
Preceding station	Soo Line	Following station
Minneapolis Terminus	Minneapolis – Sault Ste. Marie	New Brighton toward Sault Ste. Marie
Future services
Preceding station	Metro	Following station
5th Street & Robert/6th Street & Jackson toward White Bear Lake	Bronze Line	Terminus
5th Street & Robert/6th Street & Jackson toward Smith Avenue	Gold Line	Mounds toward Woodlane
- Union Depot
- U.S. National Register of Historic Places
- U.S. Historic district – Contributing property
- Location within Minnesota Location within the United States
- Interactive map of Union Depot
- Location: 214 Fourth Street East; Saint Paul, Minnesota
- Coordinates: 44°56′52″N 93°5′10″W
- Built: 1917
- Architect: Charles Sumner Frost
- Architectural style: Classical Revival
- Part of: Lowertown Historic District (ID83000935)
- NRHP reference No.: 74001040

Significant dates
- Added to NRHP: December 18, 1974
- Designated CP: February 21, 1983
Location

Saint Paul Union Depot is a historic railroad station and intermodal transit hub in the Lowertown neighborhood of Saint Paul, Minnesota. It serves light rail, intercity rail, intercity bus, and local bus services.

It is the eastern terminus for the METRO Green Line light rail line, with the stop located outside the station's headhouse. It is also the Twin Cities' stop for Amtrak, the national intercity railroad service. In addition to rail, Union Depot also serves Metro Transit, Minnesota Valley Transit Authority (MVTA), Jefferson Lines, Greyhound Lines, and Megabus.

The headhouse, located at the 4th Street entrance, was designed by architect Charles Sumner Frost and is neoclassical in style. The concourse and the waiting room that extend over the tracks are viewed as a great architectural achievement. The building was added to the National Register of Historic Places in 1974. It is also a contributing property to the Lowertown Historic District.

In addition to its transit uses, Union Depot also contains a Hertz rental car location, coffee shop, restaurant, a bike shop, offices, a museum, and loft condominiums.

== History ==
=== Original Union Depot ===
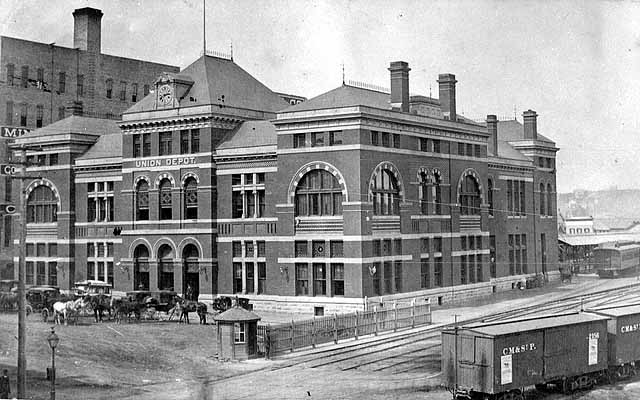
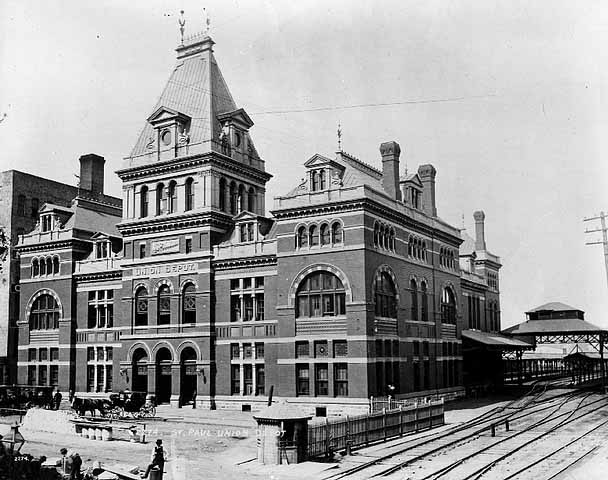
The original depot before 1886 (top) and in 1890 (bottom)

There have been two Union Depots in Saint Paul. The first was completed in 1881, and combined the services of several different railroads into one building (hence the "union"; see Union station). In 1888 the old station had its peak year, handling eight million passengers. That year, about 150 trains departed daily. Around this time, the building was remodeled with a taller central tower and other alterations to the roofline. This station burned in 1915.

=== Current building ===
The current structure was started in 1917 but was not completed until 1923 because World War I forced construction to halt for several years.

During its heyday, the depot hosted the passenger trains of nine railroads, and more than 20 million pieces of mail passed through the station to the neighboring St. Paul Central Downtown Post Office annually. At its peak in the 1920s, there were 282 train movements daily. The waiting room stood atop nine platforms serving 18 tracks; the eight northern ones closest to the headhouse were stub-end tracks, while the other ten ran through. However, track ownership and trackage rights west of the station meant that most trains operated as though the station was a stub terminal. These trains, when they were intended to continue beyond the station, instead backed up to a wye just to the east to get to other main lines.

The Saint Paul Union Depot Company controlled 9.24 miles (14.87 km) of St. Paul trackage and terminal facilities, including the depot building. The company was operated in tandem with the Minnesota Transfer Railway Company, with effective control of both properties exercised by the same board, composed of representatives of the nine tenants.

Train ridership began to erode in the 1920s as the automobile took hold and airlines began to operate. The railroads sought ways to stem the flow of passengers and compete with these new forms of transportation. As the Great Depression unfolded, more aggressive moves were required. The streamliner era in the United States began in 1934 with the introduction of the Chicago, Burlington and Quincy's Zephyr. After making a "Dawn-to-Dusk Dash" from Chicago to Denver, Colorado, the CB&Q's interest soon turned to the Twin Cities run. A demonstration run was completed in 6 hours and 4 minutes, including six one-minute stops. Other railroads were soon busy investigating how to run faster trains to Saint Paul and Minneapolis.

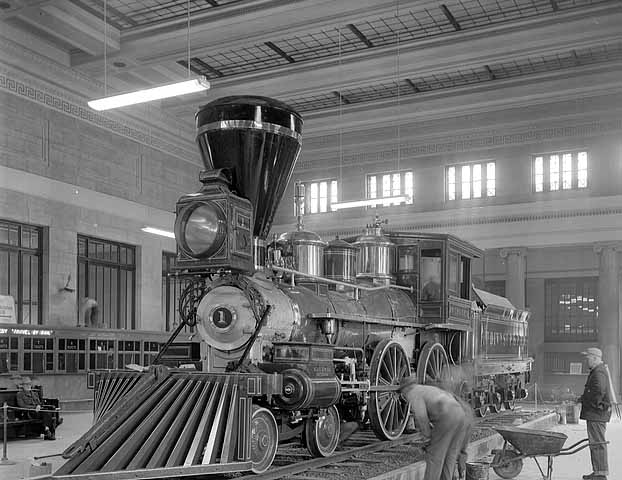
William Crooks locomotive being set up as a static display in the station's waiting room in 1954. The engine remained on display there until 1975, when it was moved to the Lake Superior Railroad Museum in Duluth.

The first locomotive to run in Minnesota, the William Crooks, was displayed at the depot from 1955 until the station's 1971 closure, after which it was moved to the Lake Superior Railroad Museum in Duluth.

=== Early high-speed trains ===
On January 2, 1935, high-speed express service to Chicago was introduced on the Chicago and North Western Railway's 400, cutting the scheduled time between the two cities from about 10 hours down to 7. Time dubbed the 400, "the fastest train scheduled on the American Continent, fastest in all the world on a stretch over 200 mi." The C&NW beat two other railroads which had been planning 6½ hour service to begin in the spring. The Milwaukee Road's Hiawatha and the Burlington Route's Twin Cities Zephyr were introduced with 6½ hour service a few months later at the same time, and C&NW matched their schedules.

The Burlington Zephyrs were the first streamlined diesel-electric trains to serve the Twin Cities, and originally ran in an articulated configuration. The 400 (now renamed the Twin Cities 400) followed in 1939, but using more conventional trucks and couplers to link passenger cars together. The Hiawatha had always been powered by a streamlined (or, in the terminology of the Milwaukee Road, "speedlined") steam locomotive. The Twin Cities Zephyrs added a second set of trains daily in 1936, running the Morning Zephyr and Afternoon Zephyr from each terminal. The Hiawatha added a second set of trains in 1939, and the Morning Hiawatha and Afternoon Hiawatha each provided daily service from Minneapolis-St. Paul and Chicago.

The Morning Hiawatha may have held the record as the world's fastest steam train on two or more measures: The 78.3 miles (126.0 km) run from Sparta to Portage, Wisconsin was scheduled for 58 minutes—an average of 81 miles per hour (130 km/h). Speeds up to and above 100 miles per hour (160 km/h) were achieved on a daily basis, and the powerful Milwaukee Road class F7 engines (designed for a "reserve speed" of 125 miles per hour (201 km/h)) likely ran more miles at or above 100 miles per hour (160 km/h) than any other steam locomotives in history.

Burlington's diesel Zephyrs were also very fast, and they had to be—the Zephyr route was about 20 miles (32 km) longer than the competition. In southwestern Wisconsin, a stretch of track between stations required an average speed of 84.4 miles per hour (135.8 km/h).

Eventually, the Hiawathas, Zephyrs, and the 400 ran 6¼-hour service between St. Paul and Chicago, and for a time the Morning Zephyr from Chicago reached St. Paul in six hours flat. In the 1950s, the federal government began imposing stricter rules for high-speed operation, and expensive advanced signaling was installed along the routes to the Twin Cities, though trains generally traveled a maximum of 90 to 100 mph (140 to 160 km/h). Unable to keep up with an increasing automobile speeds on an improving road network and other factors that kept passengers away from trains, train ridership declined and the five daily fast trains became unprofitable.

==== Other notable trains to serve the depot ====
- Twin Star Rocket (Rock Island Railroad: Minneapolis/St. Paul – Houston)
- Gopher and Badger (Great Northern Railway: Minneapolis/St. Paul – Duluth/Superior)
- North Coast Limited (Northern Pacific Railway and Chicago, Burlington & Quincy: Chicago – Seattle)
- Western Star (Great Northern Railway: Chicago – Seattle and Portland)

=== End of service ===
The Twin Cities 400 was the first victim, ending service on July 23, 1963.

It was announced that when Amtrak formally took over most passenger service on May 1, 1971, it would consolidate its Twin Cities service in Minneapolis at the Minneapolis Great Northern Depot. Accordingly, the Burlington (later Burlington Northern) Zephyrs ended service on April 30, 1971, the same day the depot closed. The Afternoon Zephyr was the last train to serve the depot when it departed that evening bound for Minneapolis. At this time, this train was normally combined with the Empire Builder and North Coast Limited from Chicago to St. Paul, except on Fridays when it ran as a separate train. Since April 30 was a Friday, the Zephyr had the "honor" of being the last train to depart the station.

=== Restoration and return of passenger service ===
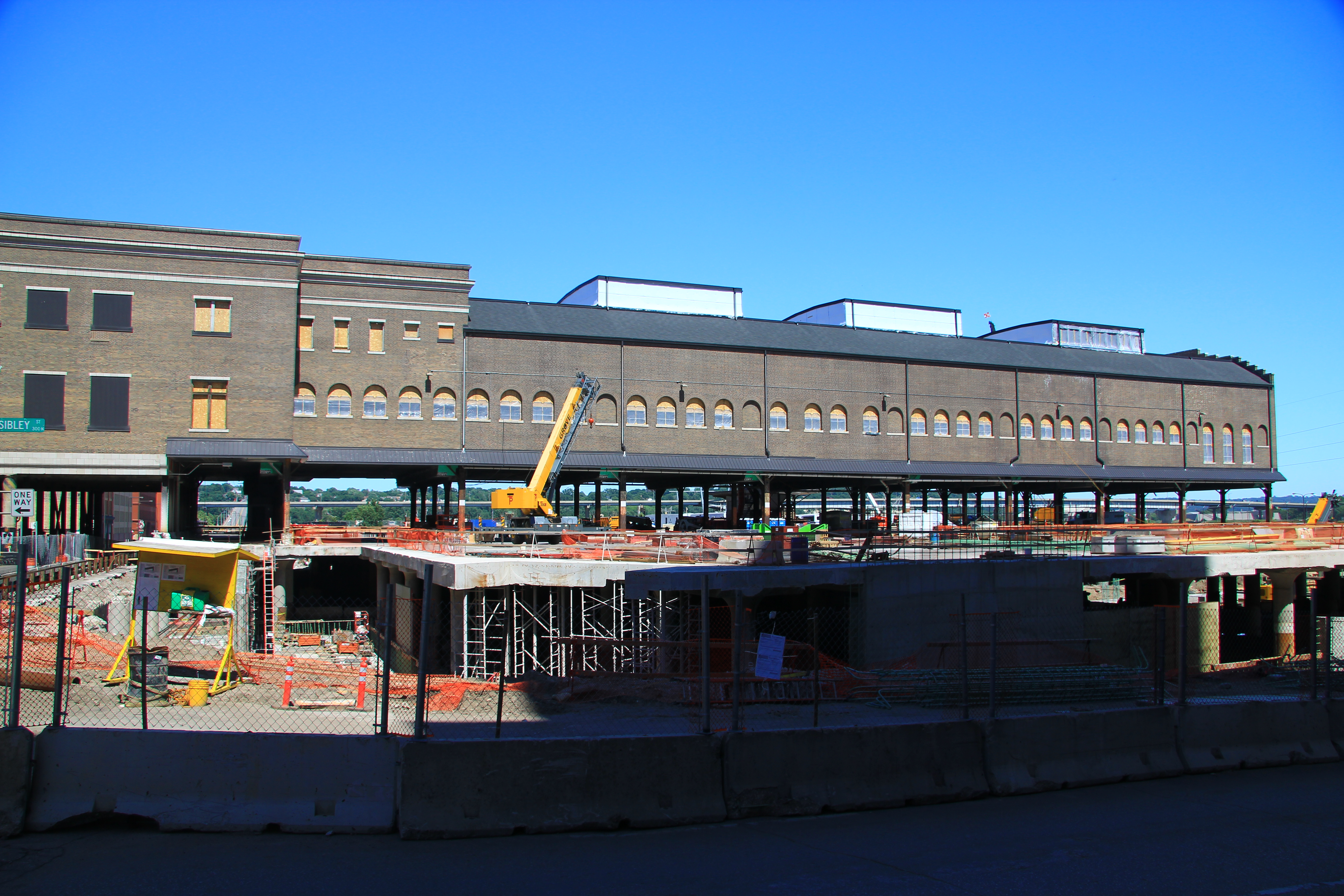
Exterior of the station during renovation

Area boosters had long hoped that trains would return to the Union Depot, and plans gathered steam as the Blue Line light rail project in Minneapolis drew toward completion. Planners envisioned the depot being used for a restored Amtrak service along with Metro and Jefferson Lines buses.

A few businesses had occupied the headhouse since the halt of train service in 1971, while the United States Postal Service (USPS) took over the rear of the building. The concourse and waiting room were used for some postal service activities and storage. After lying dormant for several years in the 1970s, the train tracks were removed from the train deck and it was paved with a flat surface. It began to be used for staging semi-trailer trucks carrying mail to and from the neighboring Downtown St. Paul Central Post Office as well as USPS employee parking. A driveway ramp was sliced into the train deck at the intersection of Kellogg Boulevard and Broadway Street for USPS vehicles. In the early 2000s, the upper levels of the headhouse were converted into 33 2-story loft condominiums.

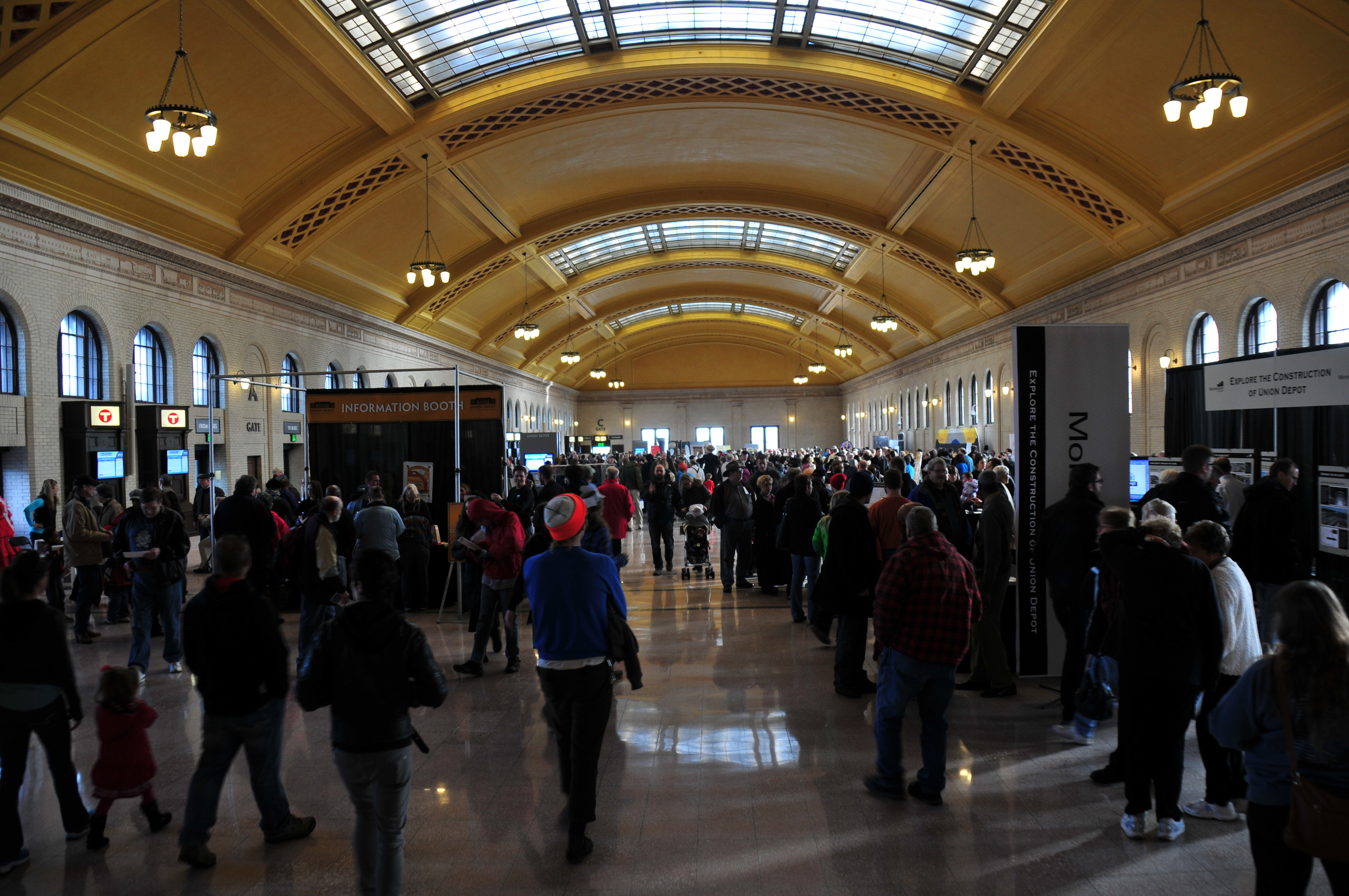
Grand opening of the newly renovated waiting room

In 2005, the Ramsey County Regional Railroad Authority secured funding to renovate the station as an intermodal transit hub served by Amtrak trains, Metro Transit light rail, and intercity bus lines.

In June 2009, the Ramsey County Board approved purchasing the depot headhouse for $8.2 million, to serve as a METRO Green Line light rail station and for future passenger rail use. In 2010, USPS moved most of the truck operations to a bulk mail processing center in Eagan, Minnesota, making way for rehabilitation of the depot as a rail hub. Demolition of the Postal Service building that blocked track access to the station began in mid-March 2011. The USPS ramp cut all the way across the train deck and blocked the ability for tracks to be installed, so the ramp was modified during restoration to make a roughly right-angle turn to access new bus platforms on the north end of the train deck while freeing up room for a few tracks to be restored on the south end.

The renovation was completed in late November 2012 at a cost of $243 million, of which $35 million was provided by the US government through the TIGER program. The renovated station re-opened to the public on December 8, 2012.

The first Amtrak train to service Saint Paul Union Depot was the westbound Empire Builder on May 7, 2014, with its eastbound counterpart stopping the next day. Borealis service began on May 21, 2024, with St. Paul as its western terminus.

== Special events ==
Since opening in late 2012, the Depot has hosted a number of events including yoga classes, weddings, seasonal farmers markets, art galas, and holiday tree lighting ceremonies among other various public and private events.

In December 2014, for the first time in nearly 50 years, an active steam locomotive returned to St. Paul Union Depot. Milwaukee Road 261 and some historic passenger cars, decorated as the "North Pole Express" ran short excursions to and from the depot. It was determined to be an overwhelming success and has continued every year since (as of 2022). In 2014 and 2015 Canadian Pacific's traveling Holiday Train made a stop at the depot.

On December 9, 2017, Metro Transit and BNSF operated a "free to ride" Northstar Holiday Train between Big Lake and St. Paul Union Depot. The event continued in 2018 and 2019, before discontinuing in 2020 due to the COVID-19 pandemic.

In 2019, as part of Union Pacific's "Great Race Across the Midwest" tour, Union Pacific 4014, made multiple stops at Union Depot for display before touring around other midwest states including Iowa, Minnesota, and Wisconsin.

In 2024, Canadian Pacific 2816 stopped here as part of its Final Spike Tour to Mexico City.

=== Union Depot Train Days ===
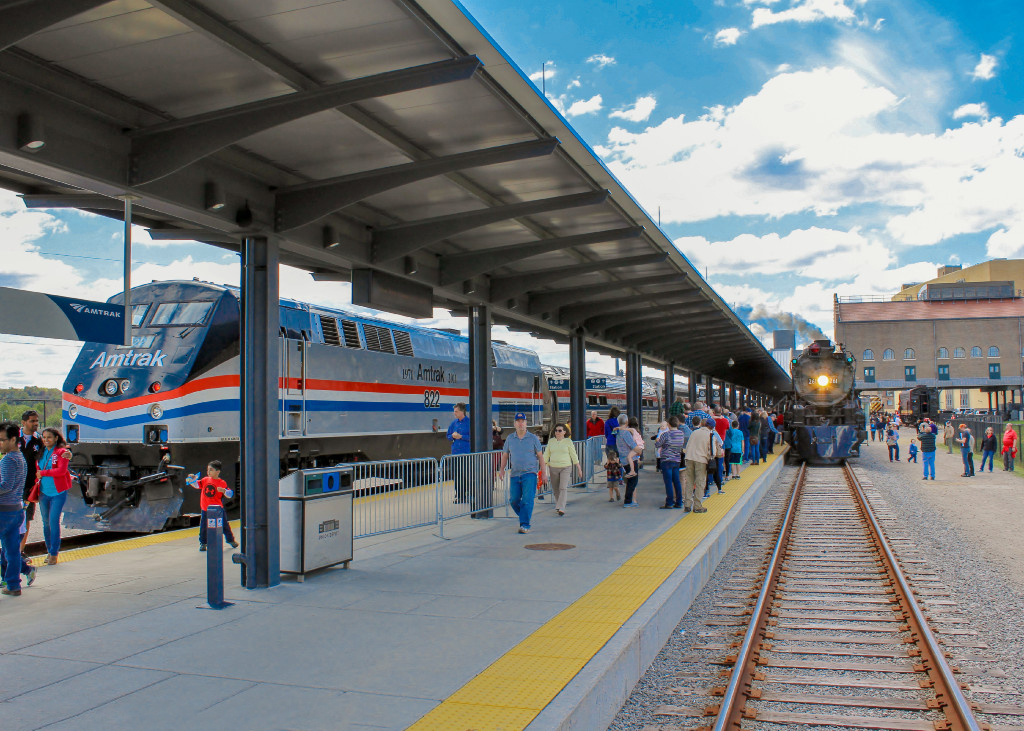
Visitors to Union Depot tour equipment on display for "Train Days" in 2016.

Every year since 2014, the depot hosts a weekend of events named "Train Days" which showcases the history and future of railroad travel, 2014 and 2015 were advertised under Amtrak's "Nation Train Day" event. After "National Train Day" was discontinued in 2015, Union Depot rebranded the event as "Union Depot Train Days" beginning in 2016. Those in attendance are treated to model train layouts, indoor and outdoor exhibits, memorabilia vendors, photography events, and railroad equipment displays, some of which are open to public touring on the platform. "Train Days" typically sees participation from area railroads and preservation organizations, including Amtrak, BNSF Railway, Canadian Pacific Kansas City, Union Pacific, Operation Lifesaver, Lake Superior Railroad Museum, Railroading Heritage of Midwest America (and subsidiary Friends of the 261), Minnesota Transportation Museum, Great Northern Railway Historical Society, Twin Cities and Western Railroad, and others.

In 2014 and 2015, Union Depot hosted National Train Day events with various indoor displays and platform displays from the Minnesota Transportation Museum, Amtrak, BNSF and Friends of the 261.

In 2016 the depot hosted its first "Union Depot Train Days" to celebrate the building's 90th Anniversary. Various displays, vendors, and photographers were featured inside the depot. Outside featured numerous rail equipment, featuring Milwaukee Road 261, Amtrak's Exhibit Train, and Soo Line FP7a #2500, among others.

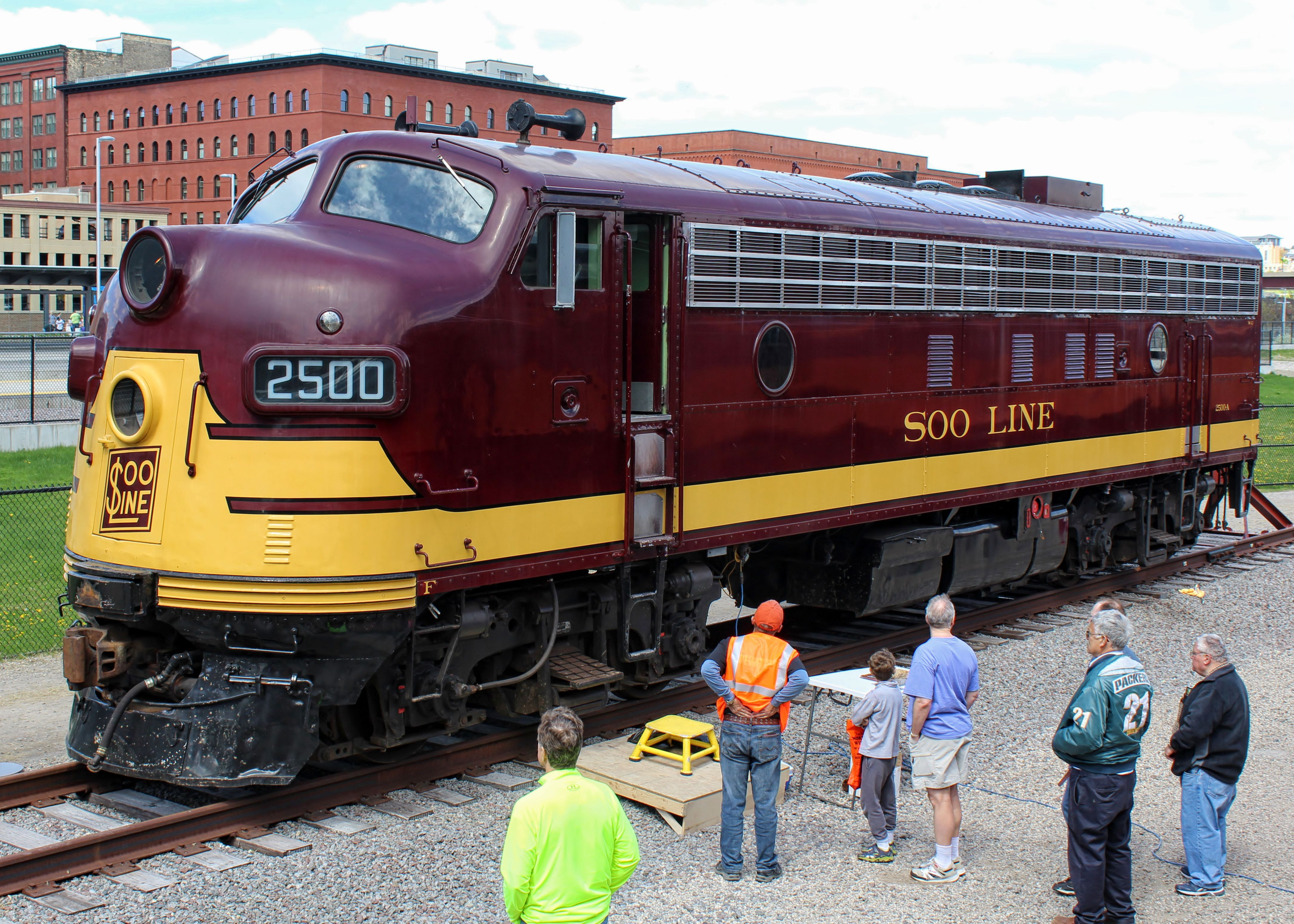
Soo 2500 on display at St Paul Union Depot

On May 6, 2017, featured railroad equipment included Amtrak's veteran's locomotive, two Union Pacific locomotives, a TC&W locomotive, and Northern Pacific RPO #1102. NP RPO #1102 had the distinction of being the "Last Mail Train" as Train Day attendees had mail transported inside the car from Union Depot to Osceola, Wisconsin.

On May 5, 2018, Minnesota Transportation Museum equipment along with Union Pacific's Chicago & Northwestern 'heritage' locomotive were on display. Train Days 2019 featured Soo Line 700 from LSRM and Wisconsin & Southern E9-A 101 from the Friends of the 261.

In 2020, "Train Days" was held virtually due to the ongoing COVID-19 pandemic, but returned in person for 2021. Because "Train Days" was held on the anniversary of "D-Day" in 2021, Union Pacific & Canadian Pacific displayed special military commemorative locomotives alongside Milwaukee Road E9 32A & Amtrak 161, specially painted for Amtrak's 50th anniversary.

Train Days returned in 2022, featuring two restored SD45s from Duluth, GN 400 and NP 3617, MILW 32A along with multiple Friends of the 261 passenger cars, Canadian Pacific and Union Pacific heritage locomotives, an Amtrak ALC-42, a TC&W locomotive and some BNSF freight cars. In 2023, two CPKC locomotives, Milwaukee Road 261 and 32A, TC&W 2020, and GN 192 from Duluth were displayed. Train Days is planned to return in June 2024.

== Services ==
=== Amtrak ===
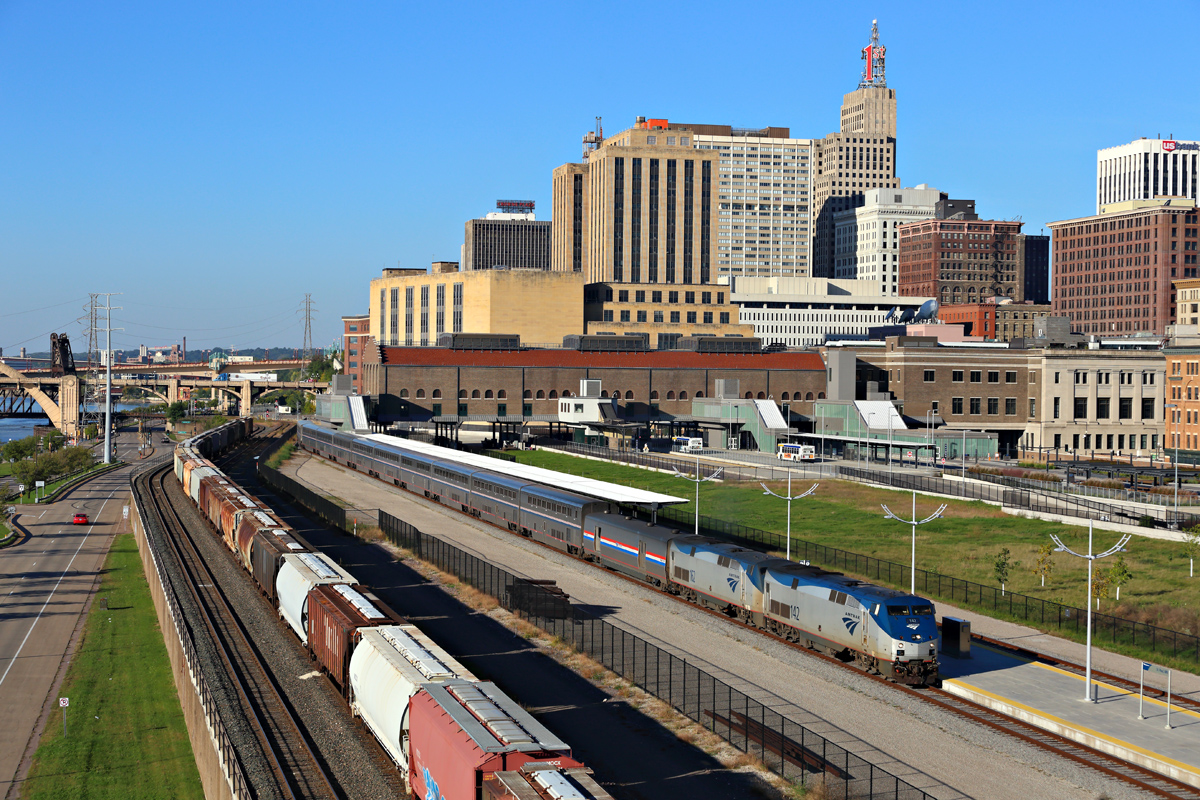
Empire Builder at Union Depot

The station is serviced by two Amtrak trains. The Empire Builder is named to honor Saint Paul-based mogul James J. Hill who constructed the Great Northern Railroad and whose nickname was "The Empire Builder", and provides service west to Seattle, Washington and Portland, Oregon and southeast to Chicago. St. Paul is also the western terminus of the Borealis, an extended Hiawatha train that supplements the Empire Builder between Chicago and St. Paul.

The Empire Builder originally stopped at the station from 1929 until 1971. In 1971, Amtrak consolidated all passenger rail service for the Twin Cities at the Great Northern Station in Minneapolis, and in 1978 moved to the Midway Station in Saint Paul, about halfway between the downtowns of the two cities. Service returned to the Union Depot from Midway in 2014 after it was delayed for almost two years from the depot's initial grand re-opening in 2012 due to negotiations with the owners of the railroads (Canadian Pacific Railway, BNSF Railway, and Union Pacific Railroad) in the area and the construction of new complex signals on the Merriam Park Subdivision.

The westbound Empire Builder arrives from Chicago in the middle of the night, usually around 10:30 p.m. The eastbound Empire Builder arrives around breakfast time. The westbound Borealis arrives from Chicago around 6:29 p.m, and departs on its return journey to Chicago at 11:50 a.m. Also included is an Amtrak Thruway to Duluth via Jefferson Lines. The station appears as St. Paul-Minneapolis in Amtrak timetables.

=== Light rail ===
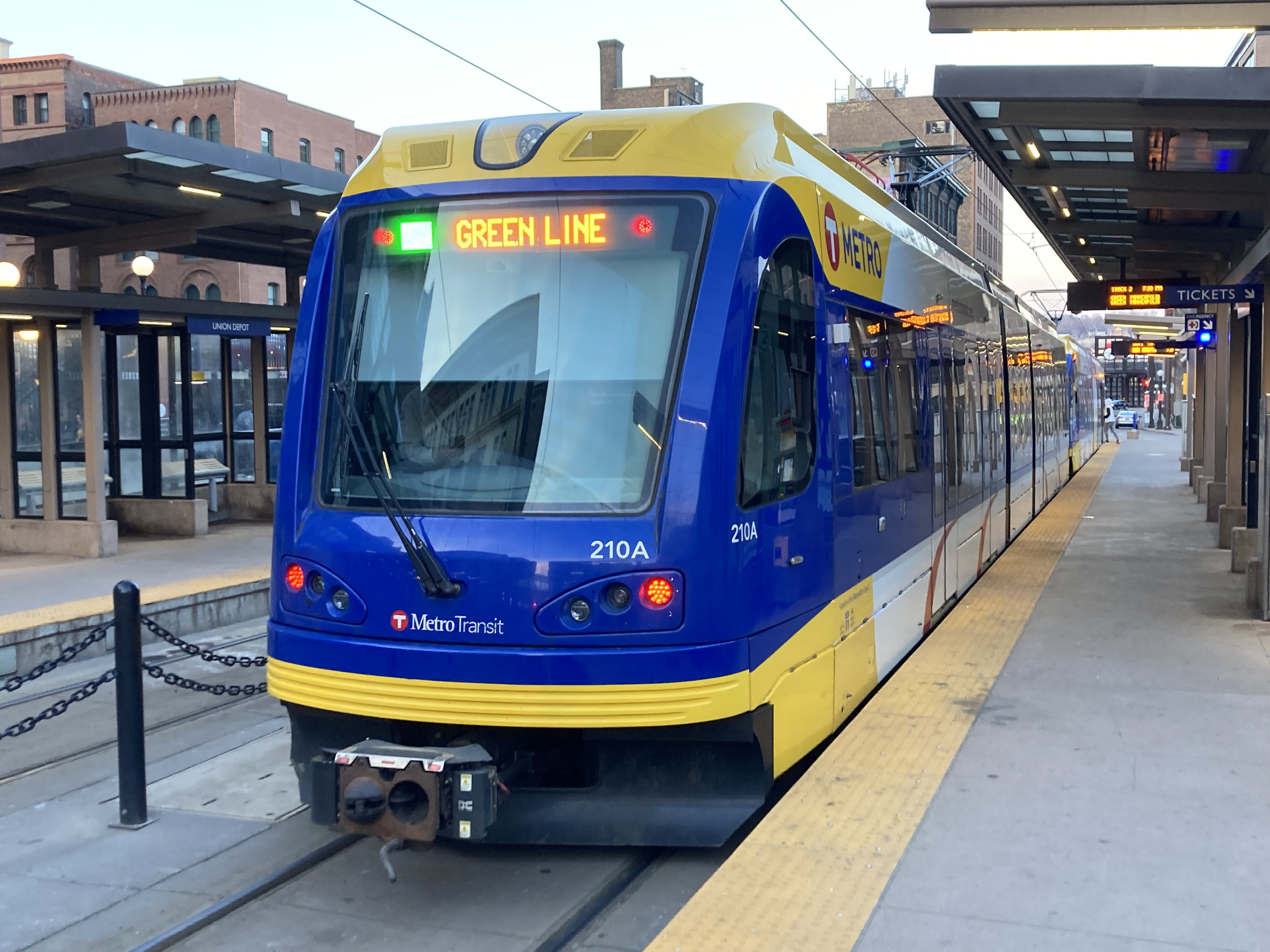
Metro Green Line train at Union Depot Light Rail Station

The depot serves as the Metro Green Line light rail line's eastern terminus. The Green Line runs between St. Paul and Minneapolis with its western terminus at Target Field station in the North Loop area of Downtown Minneapolis. The stop is in front of the headhouse, rather than at a platform under the waiting room.

The line opened on June 14, 2014. Utility relocation work in preparation for the Green Line began in front of the depot on 4th Street in August 2009, well before the line received final funding or approval. Track was laid from 2011 to 2012. While the Union Depot is the eastern terminus of service, the tracks continue beyond the station to the line's maintenance facility.

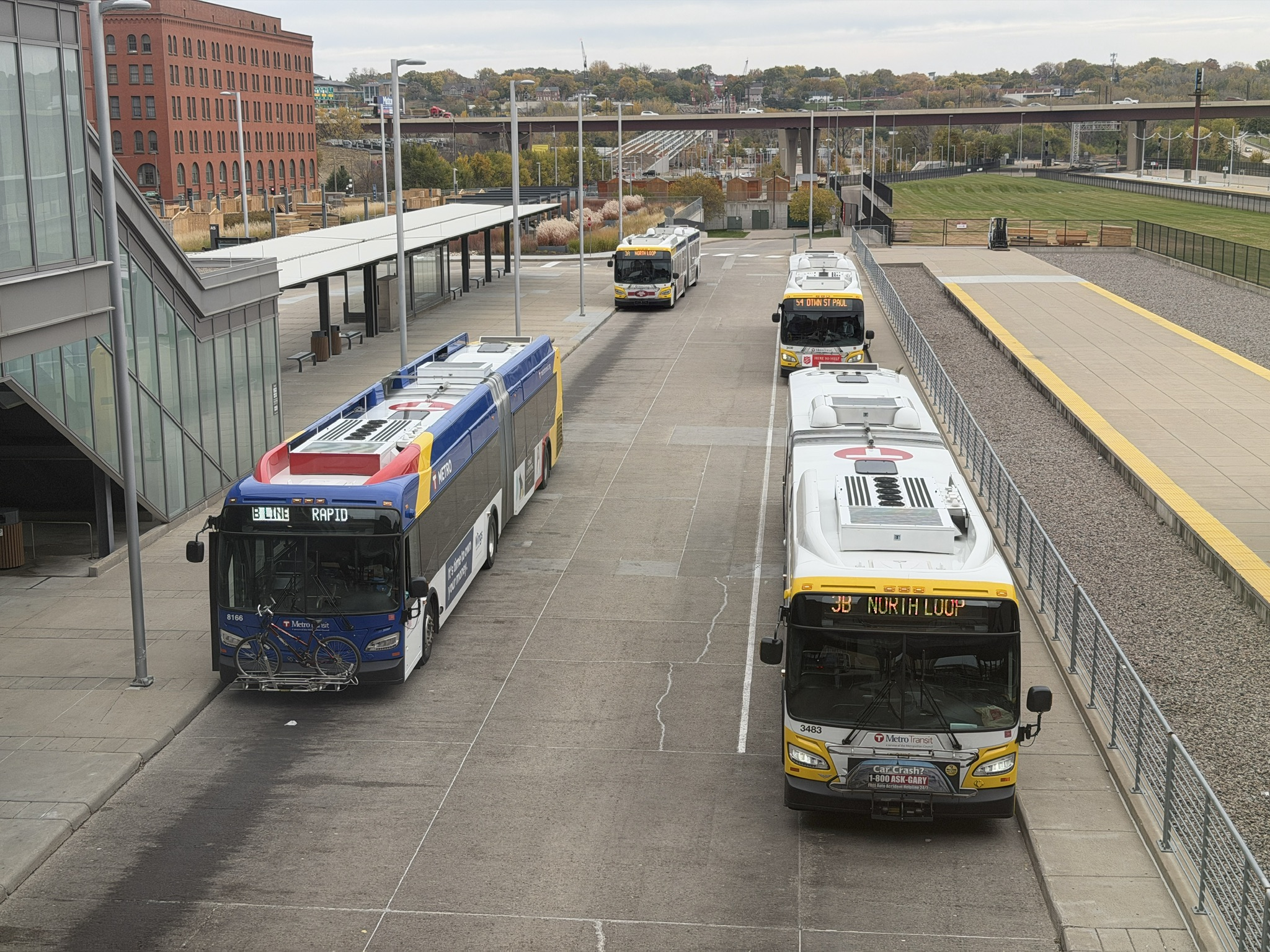
Metro Transit local buses at Union Depot in 2025.

=== Intercity bus service ===
- Greyhound Lines arrived at Saint Paul Union Depot in March 2014 after initially pulling out of the project two years prior. Greyhound offers at least six coach bus departures a day and additional weekend service.
- Jefferson Lines relocated from Midway Station to Saint Paul Union Depot in 2013.
- Megabus

=== Local and regional bus service ===
- Metro Transit: B Line, 3, 16, 54, 63, 70 and 94.
- Minnesota Valley Transit Authority: 480, 484, 489.

== Planned services ==
The current vision for the depot is to create a hub for intercity connections for local and regional bus service, light rail, and commuter rail.

=== Light rail and bus rapid transit ===
Bus rapid transit (BRT) has been selected for the Rush Line Corridor between St. Paul and White Bear Lake. The southern terminus of this route is planned to be at St. Paul Union Depot. The Gateway Corridor (now called the Gold Line) is also planned to be bus rapid transit and will operate between St. Paul and Woodbury. The Red Rock Corridor has also been proposed as a BRT service and eventually being upgraded to commuter rail, however plans are on hold as ridership on the current bus routes in this corridor are low.

The Riverview Corridor is planned to be a LRT/modern streetcar hybrid operating between St. Paul Union Depot and Mall of America. Riverview Corridor trains would share tracks and stations with the Metro Green Line between Central Station and Union Depot Station.

=== Regional rail ===
Numerous existing freight rail lines branch out from St. Paul Union Depot and could be upgraded and utilized by regional passenger trains. Currently MnDOT has studied regional rail from St. Paul Union Depot to Mankato, Northfield, and Minneapolis (continuing further west as a through-service). In 2010, the Minnesota Department of Transportation also released a plan for regional rail stretching out from the Twin Cities to rural Minnesota and neighboring states, and at least some of the lines would run to Saint Paul.

=== Intercity rail ===
For decades, the only intercity train to serve the Twin Cities was the overnight Empire Builder. However, beginning on May 21, 2024, Amtrak extended a Hiawatha train from Milwaukee to St. Paul as the Borealis, providing additional daily service between Union Depot and Chicago. The Borealis is the successor to the North Star and the Twin Cities Hiawatha. A further extension to Minneapolis Target Field Station and St. Cloud has been proposed.

==== High-speed rail ====
New trains running at speeds above 100 miles per hour (160 km/h) to Chicago have also been discussed since at least 1991. The Midwest Regional Rail Initiative (MWRRI), led by the Wisconsin Department of Transportation, has proposed a link to the Twin Cities running at up to 110 mph (180 km/h). The planned schedule time to Saint Paul would be just 5½ hours. Others including the French national railway SNCF, which operates the TGV network, have proposed trains running at up to 220 miles per hour (350 km/h).

== Local significance ==
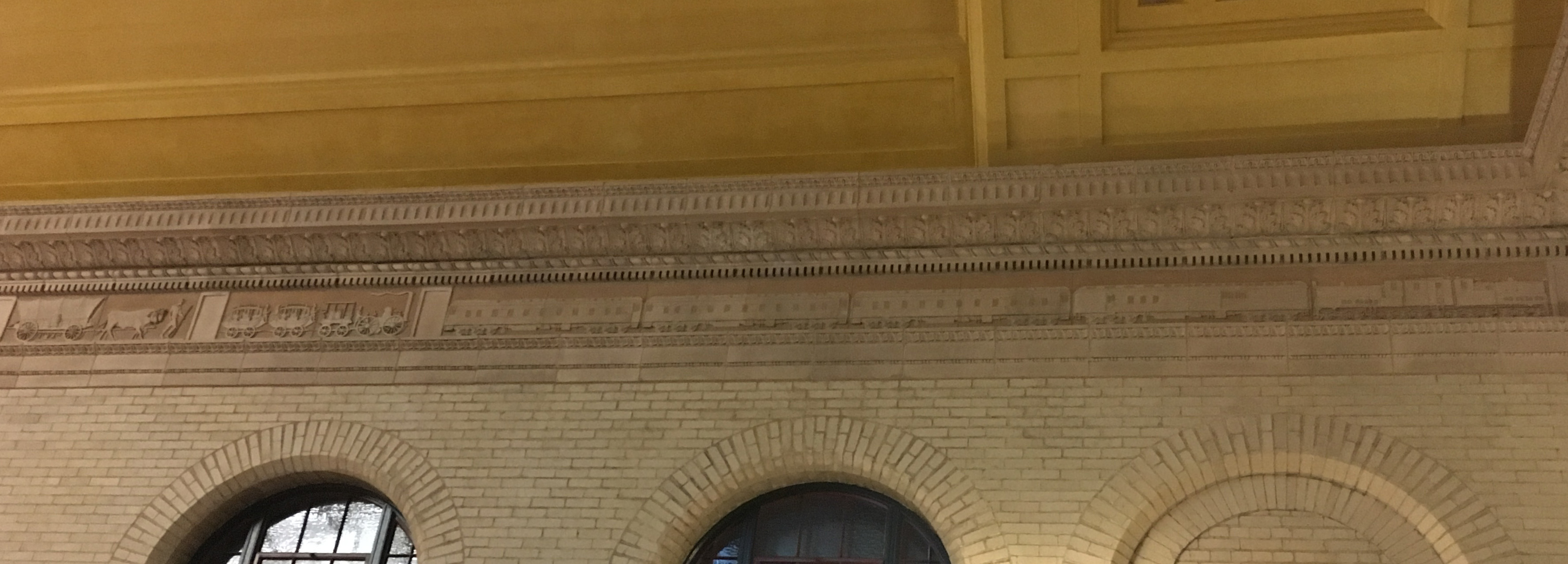

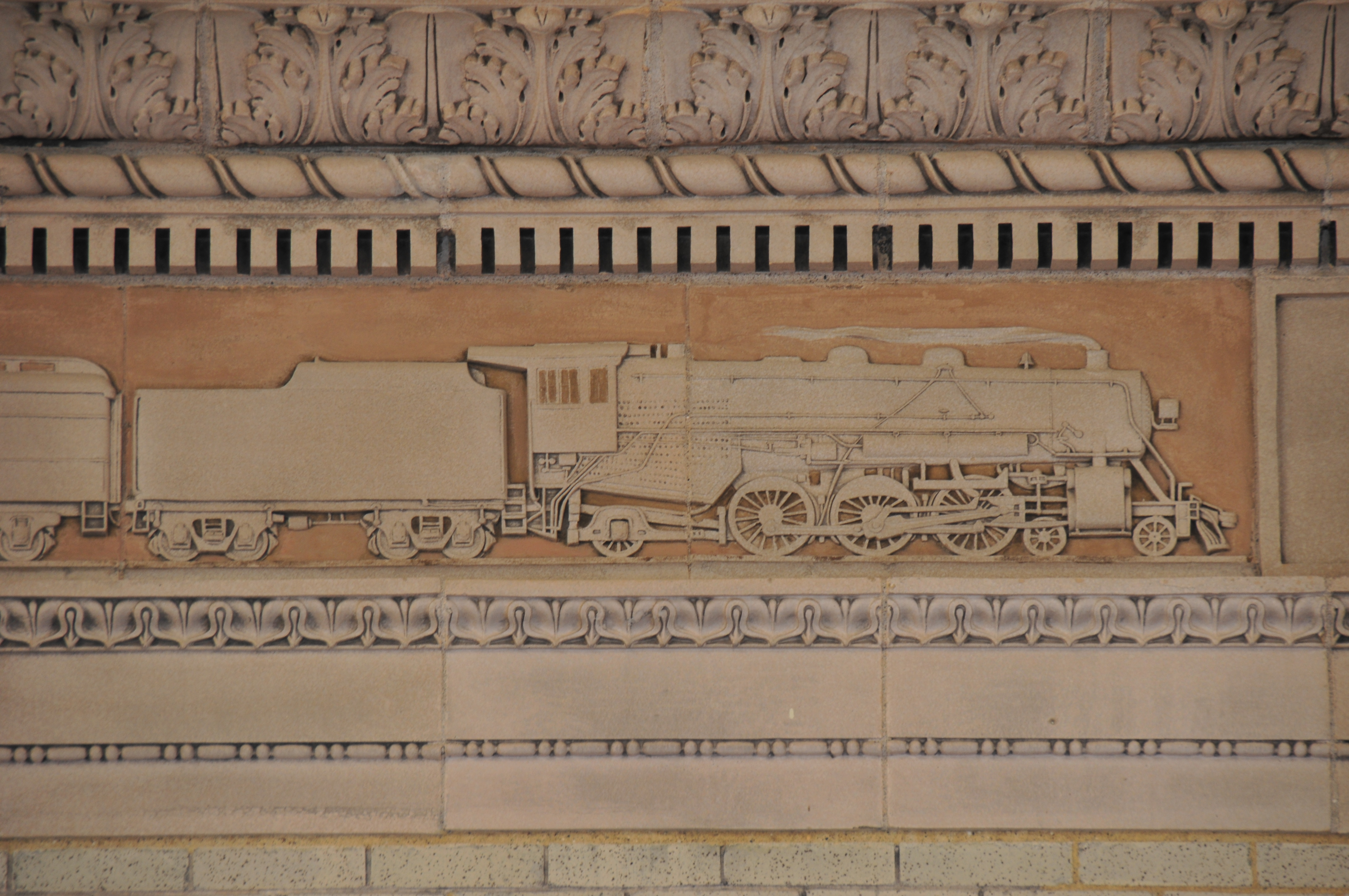
Frieze detailing on the waiting room walls

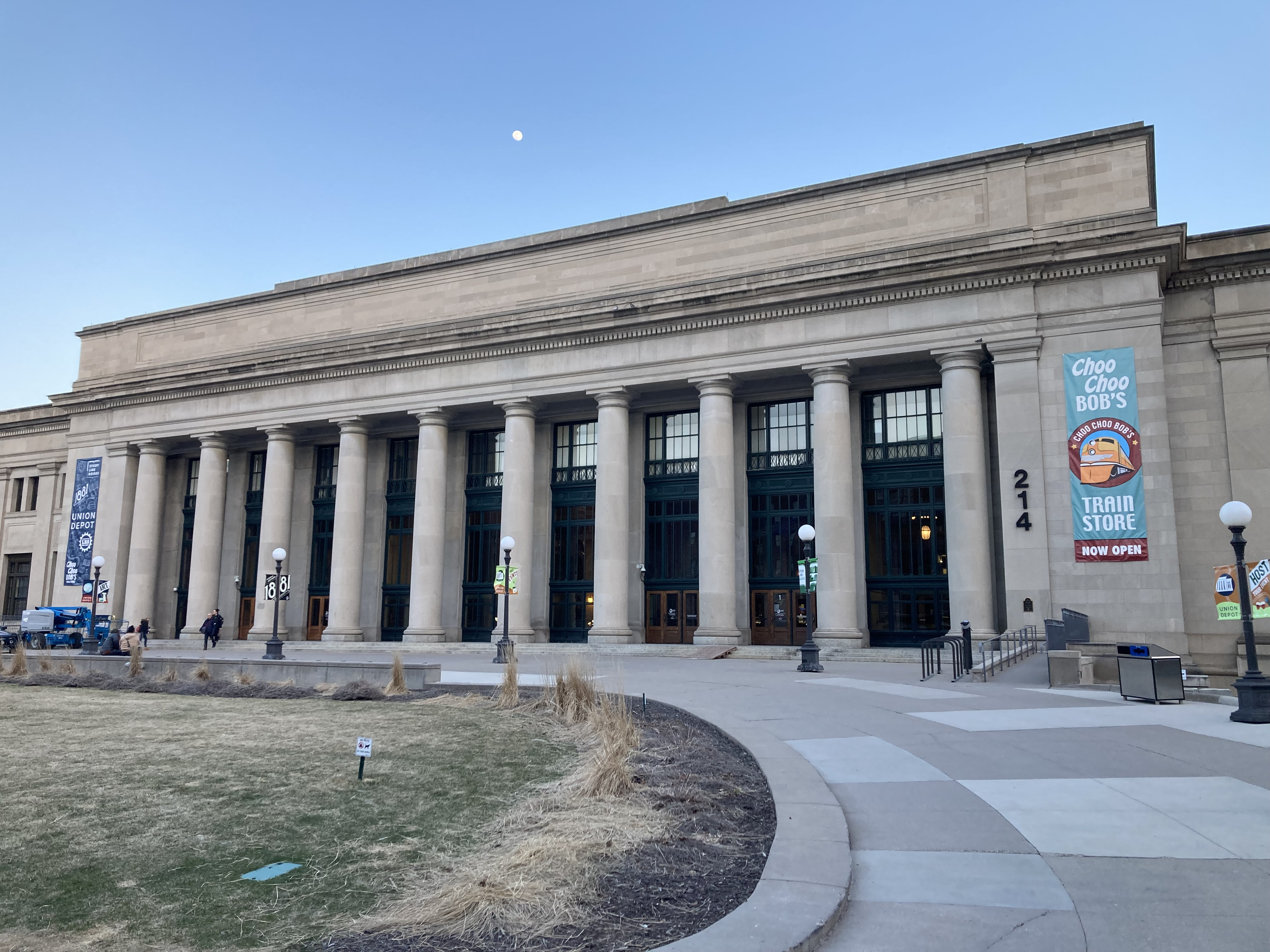
Exterior of Saint Paul Union Depot

Prior to the station's reopening in December 2012, Josh Collins, a spokesman for Ramsey County Regional Rail Authority, referred to the potential of the station to be "the living room of Saint Paul."

=== Architecture ===
The entrance to Union Depot, the headhouse, is considered a somewhat severe example of neoclassical architecture, with a robust aesthetic. A series of tall Doric columns line the front façade. The concourse and the waiting room that extends out to the platforms, where trains once rolled in, is considered to be one of the great architectural achievements in the city. Charles Frost designed the station.

The waiting room is flooded with natural light from skylights. These skylights were blackened during the Second World War, but restored for the 2012 re-opening.

The building was added to the National Register of Historic Places in 1974.

The restoration and new addition were designed by Hammel, Green and Abrahamson Architects & Engineers (HGA).

=== Railway mapping ===
Milepost for rail lines that originated in St. Paul, such as the Great Northern and Northern Pacific, had used the depot as milepost 0. This is still evident in timetables and mileposts used by the BNSF Railway.

== See also ==
=== Other rail stations in the Twin Cities ===
- Chicago, Milwaukee, St. Paul and Pacific Depot Freight House and Train Shed – Minneapolis destination for Milwaukee Road, Soo Line, and Rock Island Railroad passenger trains; now converted to other uses
- The Minneapolis Great Northern Depot in Minneapolis was used by trains of the Chicago and North Western Railway, Great Northern Railway, and Northern Pacific railroads
- The Chicago Great Western Railway had a station on south Washington Avenue in Minneapolis
- The Minneapolis and St. Louis Railway had a station on north 5th Street in Minneapolis
- Midway Station – former Amtrak station
- Target Field Station – terminus for the former Northstar Line commuter trains

=== Regional and enhanced-speed train proposals ===
- Chicago Hub Network
- Passenger rail projects in Minnesota

=== Other initially abandoned stations ===
- Kansas City Union Station – An Amtrak station that was abandoned in 1985, but restored in 2002
- Cincinnati Union Terminal – An Amtrak station that was abandoned in 1972, but restored in 1991
