= Metro Bronze Line (Minnesota) =

Planned bus rapid transit line

Overview
- System: Metro
- Status: Planned

Route
- Route type: Bus rapid transit
- Locale: Minneapolis–St. Paul, Minnesota
- Start: Maplewood Mall Transit Center
- End: Downtown St. Paul
- Length: 15 miles
- Stations: 21

Service
- Operates: 55 mph (89 km/h) max
- Ridership: 7,400 (2040 Projection)

The Metro Bronze Line, formerly known as the Metro Purple Line and the Rush Line Corridor, is a planned bus rapid transit service that would run from Union Depot in downtown Saint Paul to the northeastern suburbs of Saint Paul. Along the corridor's 21 proposed stations there are 106,000 jobs within a 10-minute walk. The project is currently in an environmental analysis phase with further development, engineering, and construction expected to take at least six more years. Service would run 7-days a week with 10-minute headways in peak periods and 15-minute service at most other times. The corridor was named the Rush Line because it was originally planned to end in Rush City, Minnesota. After using the color purple since 2017, the route was officially named the Purple Line and became part of the Metro network on July 14, 2021. In September 2025, Metro Transit announced that the Purple Line project would be discontinued and in December 2025, it was reintroduced as the Bronze Line.

== Potential commuter rail ==
At one point the project was proposed to be commuter rail all the way to Hinckley, Minnesota. The corridor studied roughly follows the path of U.S. Route 61 and Interstate 35. Along with the Red Rock Corridor in the southeast and the Metro Green Line Extension in the southwest Metro, it was considered a "Tier Two" commuter rail project with scheduled implementation after 2020. Efforts to improve the corridor are coordinated by the Rush Line Corridor Task Force, formed in 1999 and composed of 22 elected officials from counties and municipalities along the corridor.

Commuter rail costs were expected to be high if implemented, due to the multiple railroads operating the tracks, additionally some sections of rail would have to be rebuilt on county-owned abandoned rights-of-way. Existing rail is a combination of Class I and Class III railroads. Despite a relatively high population density, projected ridership was lower than originally anticipated because commuters are split in their final destination, mostly downtown Saint Paul or downtown Minneapolis. If commuter rail was built it could have connected with the proposed Northern Lights Express in Hinckley and provide a more direct link between Saint Paul and Duluth.

== Alternatives study ==
Alternatives to commuter rail were presented, including the implementation bus rapid transit throughout the corridor or light rail in the Ramsey County portion, from Union Depot to White Bear Lake. Despite having significantly lower operating costs than commuter rail, light rail would require taking lanes on East Seventh Street in downtown Saint Paul, additionally track right of way would run close to residential structures.

The Ramsey and Washington county portions of the corridor are served by local Metro Transit bus routes. In September 2009, the Metropolitan Council awarded $3.4 million to extend the existing park and ride facilities at Maplewood Mall. In September 2010, a commuter bus service is expected to begin service in the corridor. Originating from Columbus and Forest Lake, the route is planning a stop in White Bear Township en route to multiple stops in downtown Saint Paul before terminating at Union Depot. Ridership is expected at 200 persons a day. The Rush Line Task Force and the Metropolitan Council are looking for access to county and federal funds to cover capital costs.

A preliminary study was released in September 2015 by the Rush Line Task Force narrowing down the options to 4 types of vehicles and routes that will be considered for the project. The options include:

- Dedicated bus rapid transit from the Union Depot to downtown Forest Lake
- Diesel Multiple Unit (DMU) train between the Union Depot to White Bear Lake
- Light Rail Transit (LRT) train between the Union Depot to White Bear Lake
- Arterial Bus Rapid Transit (BRT) between St Paul and White Bear Lake

A second phase of the study will be completed during Winter 2015 and Spring 2016 timeframe, according to page 5 of the Tier 1 Evaluation Results report.

== Pre-Project Development and Environmental Analysis Phase ==
Ramsey County approved the Locally Preferred Alternative in September 2017. The bus rapid transit project will travel the 14-miles from Saint Paul Union Depot to downtown White Bear Lake on 85-90% dedicated guideway. The project initially had 20 stations but at the public's request an additional station was added. The project's final station location in downtown White Bear Lake has generated controversy.

The project would cost between $420-470 million and could open as soon as 2026.

The project's Environmental Assessment was released in May 2021 for public comment. An end-to-end running time of roughly 45 minutes was projected. An estimated 7,400 rides were projected by 2040 with 54% of those rides being for work commutes. 70% of the 15-mile route would be on guideway dedicated to transit. The project needs to undergo further project development, final engineering, and construction before service begins in 2026. While the project is currently being developed by Ramsey County, following completion of the Environmental Assessment the project development is handed off to the Metropolitan Council for completion and operation. The project has completed the planning process and is now in the development phase with an engineering firm hired as a consultant.

== Potential alignment change ==
In March 2022, the White Bear Lake City Council with support from the mayor passed a resolution requesting that the route not enter their city. Unlike light rail projects, bus rapid transit projects in Minnesota do not require municipal consent to be constructed. White Bear Lake approved resolutions in support of the project as recently as 2020, but a recently election which elected several opponents of the project changed the level of support within White Bear Lake city government.

In response, Metro Transit and Ramsey County are developing alternatives which may entail truncating the route at Maplewood Mall or County Road E, and offering a "Purple Line Connector" bus route from the new terminus of the Purple Line to White Bear Lake. The Purple Line Connector would have reduced frequency of buses but the same span of service as the Purple Line. A connector route would have minimal infrastructure improvements but still respond to the project's goals of connecting the northeast metropolitan area with the METRO system.

The Purple Line BRT Corridor Management Committee unanimously rejected the locally preferred alternative to downtown White Bear Lake in June 2022. The route will still travel to Maplewood Mall, but the end point was still to be determined and could be Century College, the TCO Sports Garden, or the I-35E & County Road E park-and-ride lot. Based on a new terminus and revised population projections and models, the project no longer met the threshold for federal funding and requires revision to unlock federal funds as part of the Capital Investment Grants program.

The city of Maplewood withdrew support from the project in October 2022 amid concerns of the use eminent domain in the project and the future of the transit ridership in a post-COVID-19 era of increased work from home and decreased ridership. The city called for a longer timeline in studying transit options in the corridor. A new alignment had been expected in early 2023.
