= Merriam Park Subdivision =

Rail line in Saint Paul, Minnesota

Overview
- Other name(s): Short Line
- Status: Active
- Owner: Canadian Pacific Kansas City
- Locale: Minnesota
- Termini: Minneapolis; Saint Paul

Service
- Type: Freight, passenger
- Operator(s): Canadian Pacific Kansas City, Amtrak

History
- Completed: 1880

Technical
- Number of tracks: 1–2
- Track gauge: 4 ft 8 1/2 in (1,435 mm) standard gauge

The Canadian Pacific Kansas City's Merriam Park Subdivision or Merriam Park Sub, also known as the Short Line, is a railway line in Saint Paul, Minnesota. It is run by the Soo Line Railroad, a U.S. in-name-only division of CPKC. It runs from the Saint Paul Yard, also known as the Pigs Eye Yard, westward to the Short Line Bridge over the Mississippi River, where rails continue as part of the Minnesota Commercial Railway. It was named for John L. Merriam, a Minnesota banker and politician. Completed by the Chicago, Milwaukee and St. Paul Railroad in 1880, it shortened the route Milwaukee Road trains took between downtown Saint Paul and downtown Minneapolis. Previous trains would exit Saint Paul and follow the Mississippi River southwest until crossing at Fort Snelling, where they would follow the path of today's Hiawatha Avenue (Minnesota State Highway 55) and the Metro Blue Line toward the Milwaukee Road Depot. Originally built as an interurban route, it was eventually converted for heavy rail traffic because the Twin City Rapid Transit streetcar system had taken over the local transit market.

Passenger trains continued to use the Short Line into Minneapolis until 1971 when the Hiawatha stopped service with the formation of Amtrak. Amtrak's Empire Builder continues to use the eastern portion of this line, but the train exits the subdivision to the north onto Minnesota Commercial Railway trackage to reach the now unused Midway station in Saint Paul. Amtrak returned to using Saint Paul Union Depot in 2014, but continues to route trains in the same way.
