= St. Louis Park station =

Railway station in Minnesota, United States

St. Louis Park
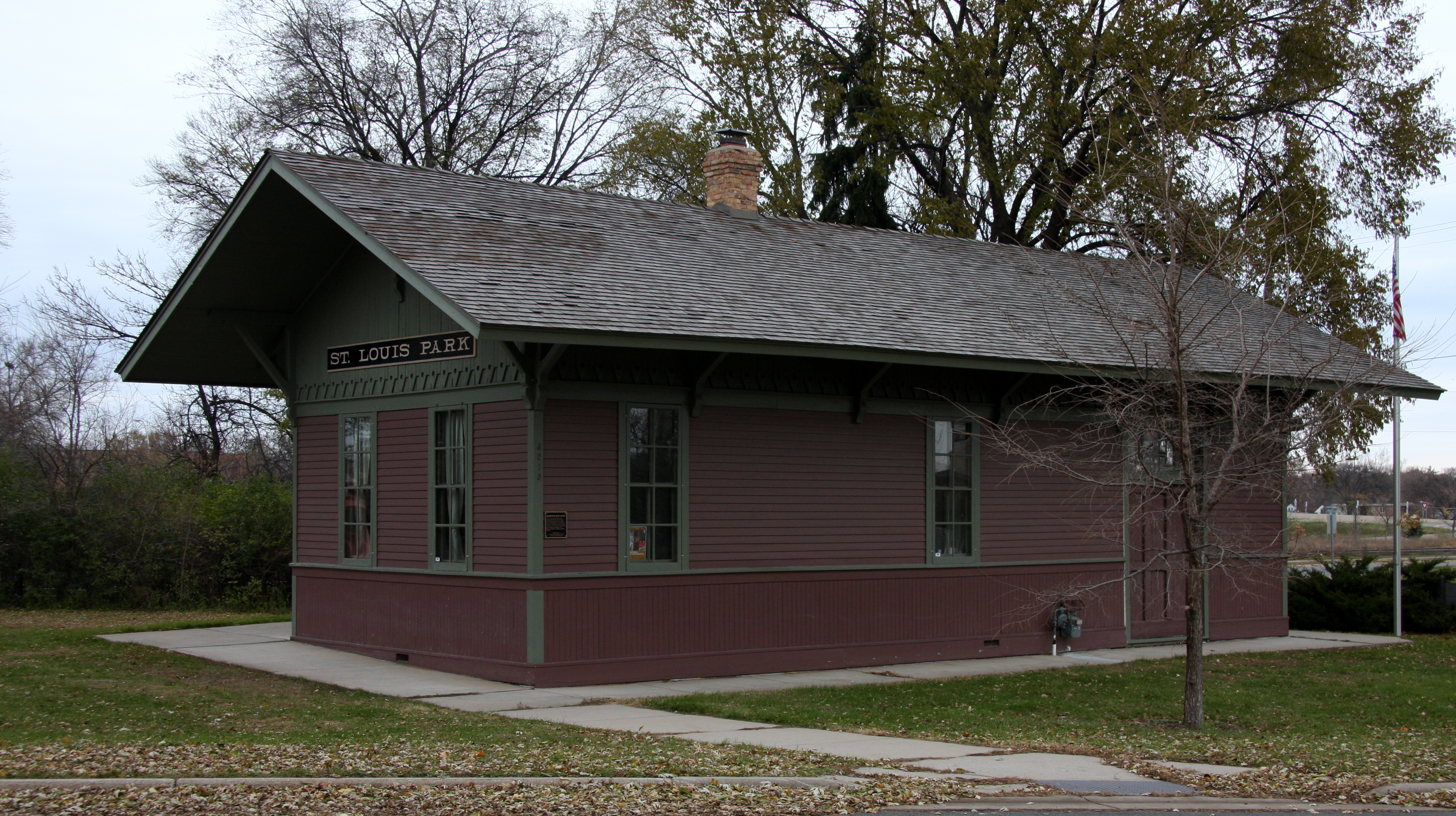
- The building in 2013

General information
- Location: 6210 West 37th Street, St. Louis Park, Minnesota 55416
- System: Former Milwaukee Road passenger rail station

History
- Opened: 1887
- Closed: 1968

Services
Preceding station	Milwaukee Road	Following station
Hopkins toward Seattle or Tacoma	Main Line	Minneapolis toward Chicago
- Chicago, Milwaukee, St. Paul and Pacific Depot
- U.S. National Register of Historic Places
- Location within Minnesota Location within the United States
- Location: St. Louis Park, Minnesota
- Coordinates: 44°56′13″N 93°21′28.8″W
- Built: 1887
- NRHP reference No.: 69000072
- Added to NRHP: November 25, 1969
Location

The Chicago, Milwaukee, St. Paul and Pacific Depot or St. Louis Park Station, now located at 6210 West 37th Street and Brunswick Avenue, St. Louis Park, in the U.S. state of Minnesota, was moved from the intersection of Wooddale and 36th Street on Alabama Avenue, where it sat next to the railroad tracks. The depot served the Milwaukee Road from 1887 to 1968 and now serves as a museum for the St. Louis Park Historical Society.
