= Decorah station =

Decorah
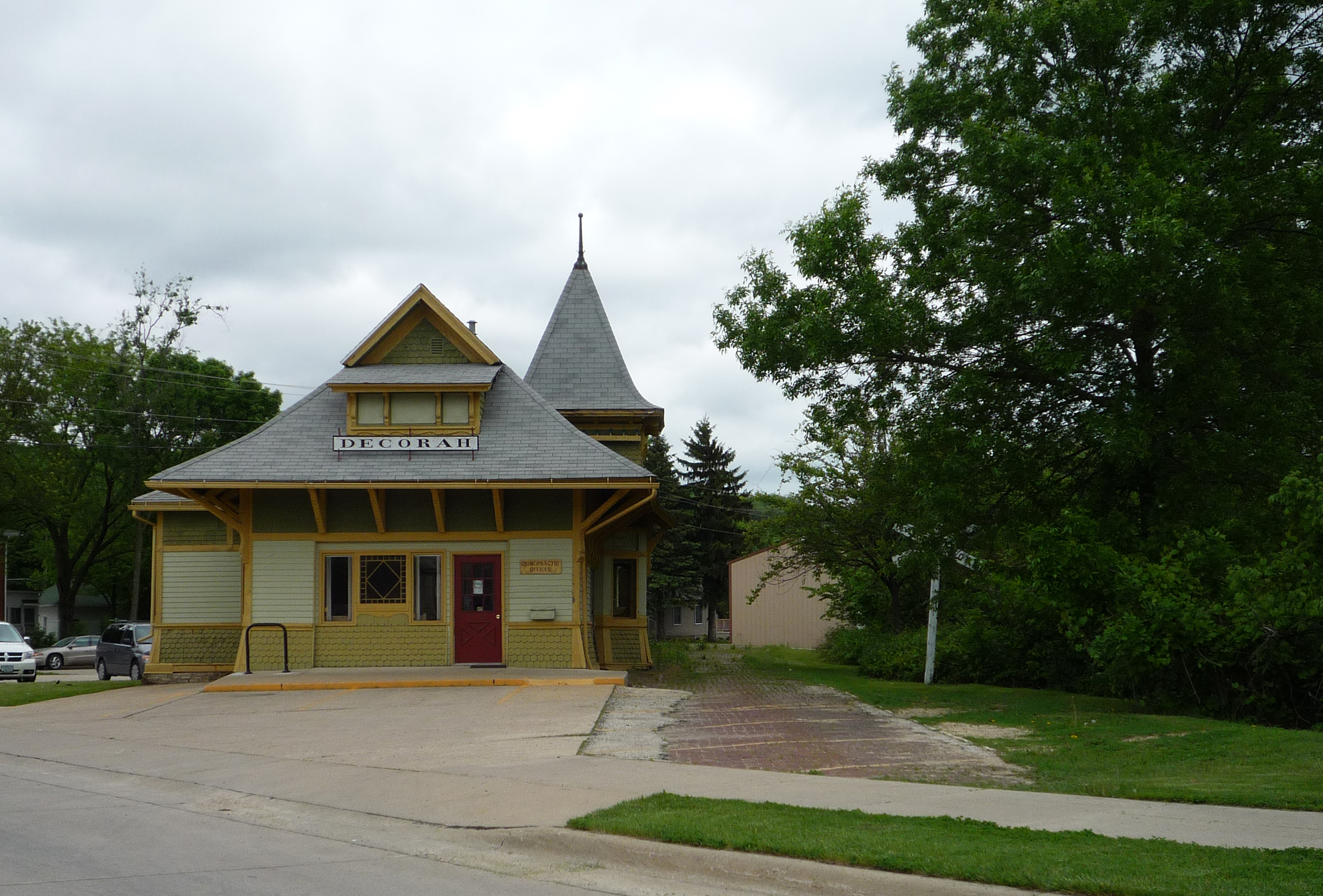
- The replacement passenger depot built in 1888, now used as a chiropractic office

General information
- Location: 203 West Pearl Street, Decorah, Iowa 52101
- System: Former Milwaukee Road passenger rail station

History
- Opened: 1869
- Rebuilt: 1888

Services
Preceding station	Milwaukee Road	Following station
Terminus	Decorah – Calmar	Conover toward Calmar
- Milwaukee and St. Paul Railway Combination Depot
- U.S. National Register of Historic Places
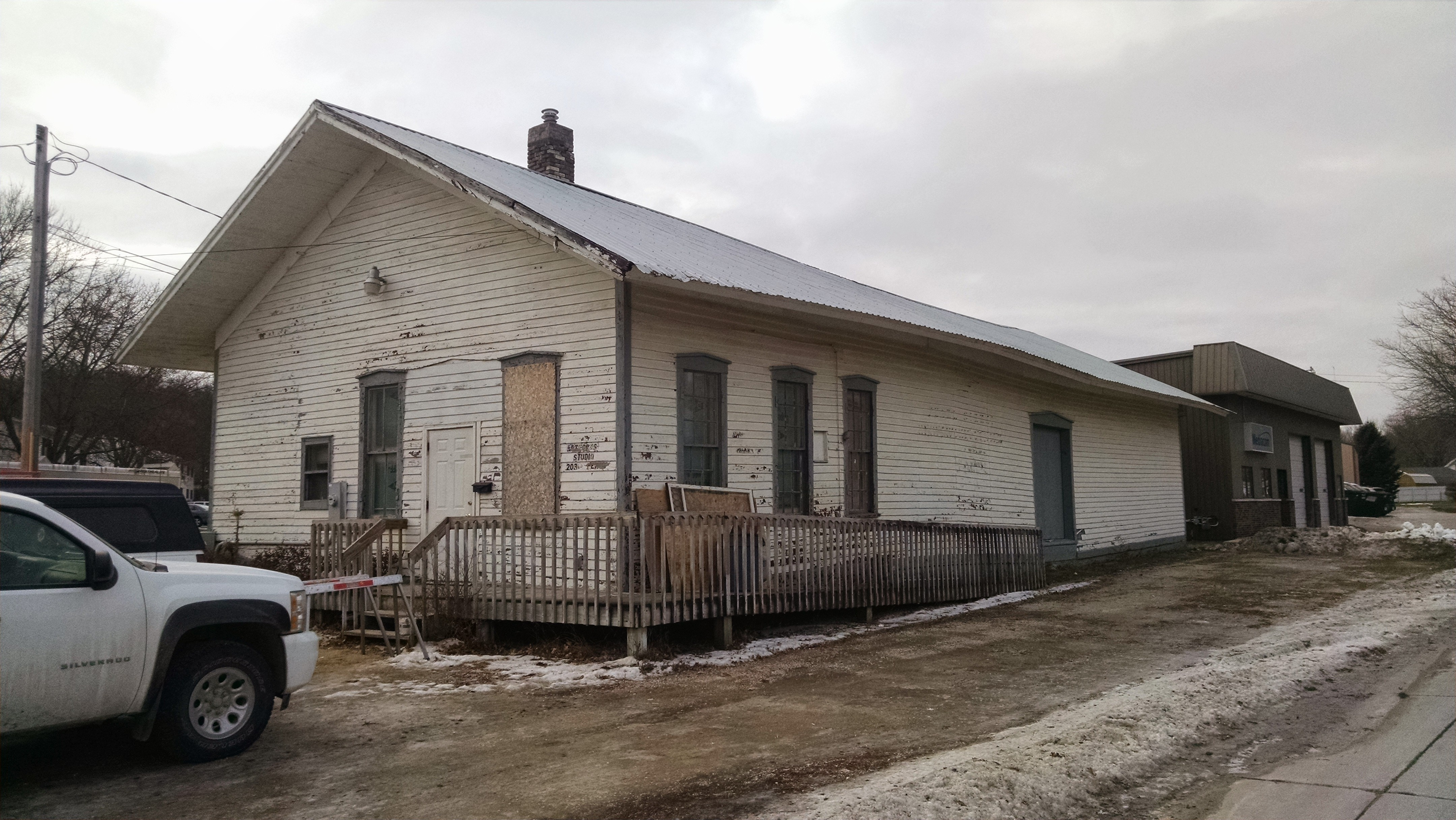

- Location within Iowa Location within the United States
- Location: 203 W. Pearl St. Decorah, Iowa
- Coordinates: 43°17′54.7″N 91°47′14.9″W
- Area: less than one acre
- Built: 1869
- Architect: Milwaukee and St. Paul Railroad
- Architectural style: Greek Revival
- NRHP reference No.: 16000609
- Added to NRHP: September 12, 2016
Location

The Milwaukee and St. Paul Railway Combination Depot is a historic building located in Decorah, Iowa, United States. After the Milwaukee and St. Paul Railroad, later the Chicago, Milwaukee, St. Paul and Pacific Railroad, choose a different route for their north–south mainline, community leaders convinced them to build a spur to Decorah. This would open the town to larger markets to ship the products produced there. The tracks were completed in 1869, and a boxcar served as the first depot. That same year this single-story, wood-frame structure with Greek Revival features was completed south of the central business district. It served as a combination depot, servicing both passengers and freight. After the arrival of the Chicago, Rock Island and Pacific Railroad in 1884 the Milwaukee Road started to plan a new passenger depot in Decorah. It was completed on the east end of the main commercial street in 1888. When it opened, this building continued to serve as a freight depot. Over the years its platforms were shortened, and sometime between the 1930s and the 1950s, the southwest end of the building was shortened. The Milwaukee Road abandoned the depot in 1971, and the tracks that flanked the building were removed the same year. The former depot itself was renovated for non-railroad use. This is believed to be a rare extant example of a wooden combination depot in Iowa. The building was listed on the National Register of Historic Places in 2016.
