= Calmar Passenger Depot =

Building in Calmar, Iowa, United States

Calmar
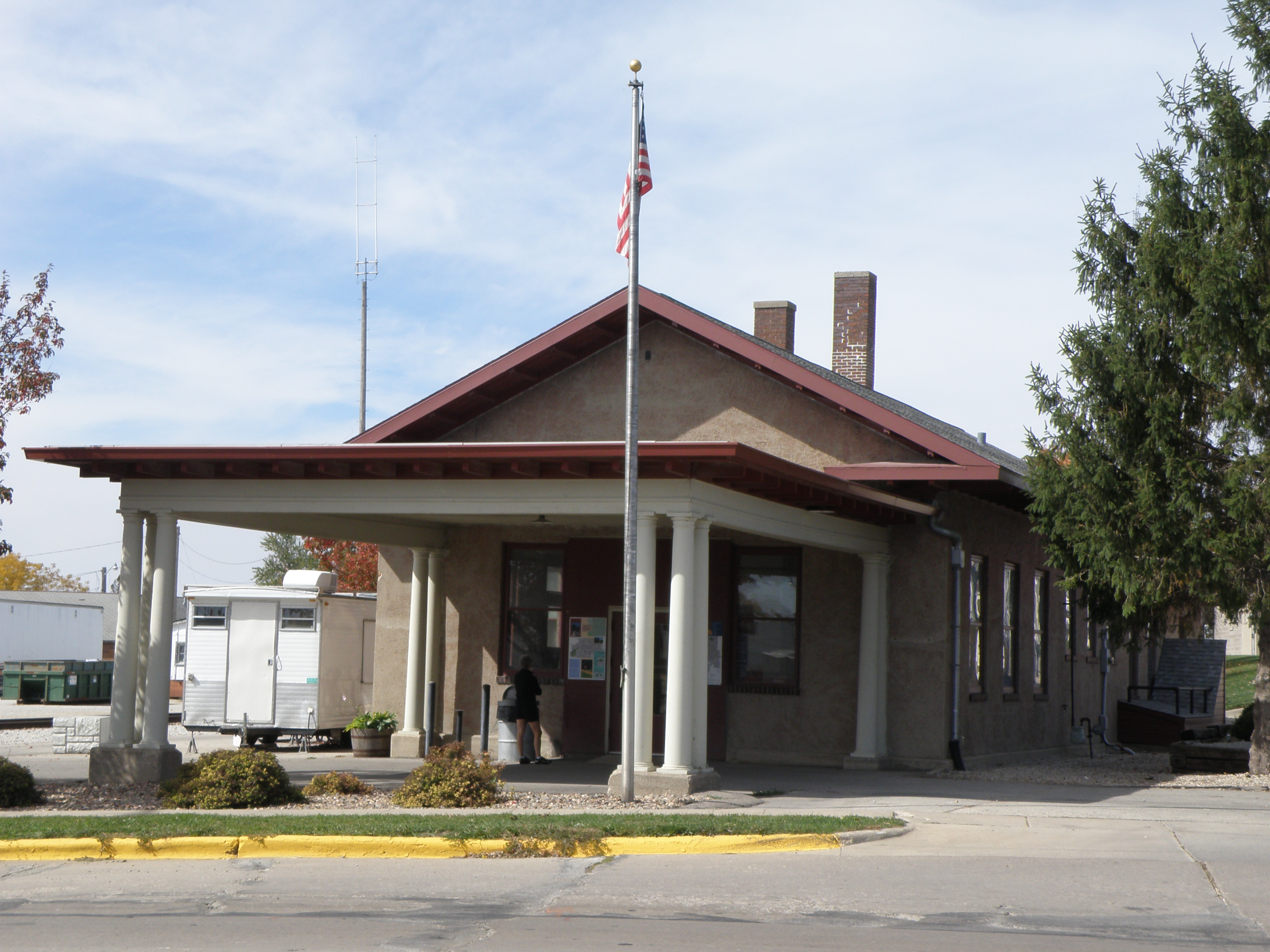
- Calmar station in September 2012.

General information
- Location: 201 North Maryville Street, Calmar, Iowa 52132
- System: Former Milwaukee Road passenger rail station

History
- Rebuilt: 1915

Services
Preceding station	Milwaukee Road	Following station
Fort Atkinson toward Rapid City	Rapid City – Madison	Ossian toward Madison
Fort Atkinson toward Cedar Rapids	Cedar Rapids – Calmar	Terminus
Conover toward Minneapolis	Minneapolis – Calmar	Terminus
Conover toward Decorah	Decorah – Calmar	Terminus
- Calmar Passenger Depot
- U.S. National Register of Historic Places
- Location within Iowa Location within the United States
- Location: 201 N. Maryville St. Calmar, Iowa
- Coordinates: 43°11′02″N 91°51′53″W
- Built: 1915
- Architect: Chicago, Milwaukee & St. Paul Railroad; H.C. Lotholz
- Architectural style: Classical Revival
- MPS: Advent & Development of Railroads in Iowa MPS
- NRHP reference No.: 11000137
- Added to NRHP: March 21, 2011
Location

The Calmar Passenger Depot is a historic building located in Calmar, Iowa, United States. It was built by the Chicago, Milwaukee & St. Paul Railroad in 1915 to replace the Depot Hotel that had been destroyed in a fire. The single-story building originally featured a 27 feet (8 m) canopy on its east side that was removed by the railroad in 1970. It was reconstructed in 1998. The passenger trains were on a line that ran between Madison, Wisconsin and South Dakota. They were discontinued in the 1960s. The former depot now houses restrooms for the Prairie Farmer Bike trail, which is adjacent to the building, farmers and flea markets, and other small community events. It was listed on the National Register of Historic Places in 2011.
