= Minneapolis station (Milwaukee Road) =

Historic railroad depot in Minneapolis, Minnesota

Minneapolis
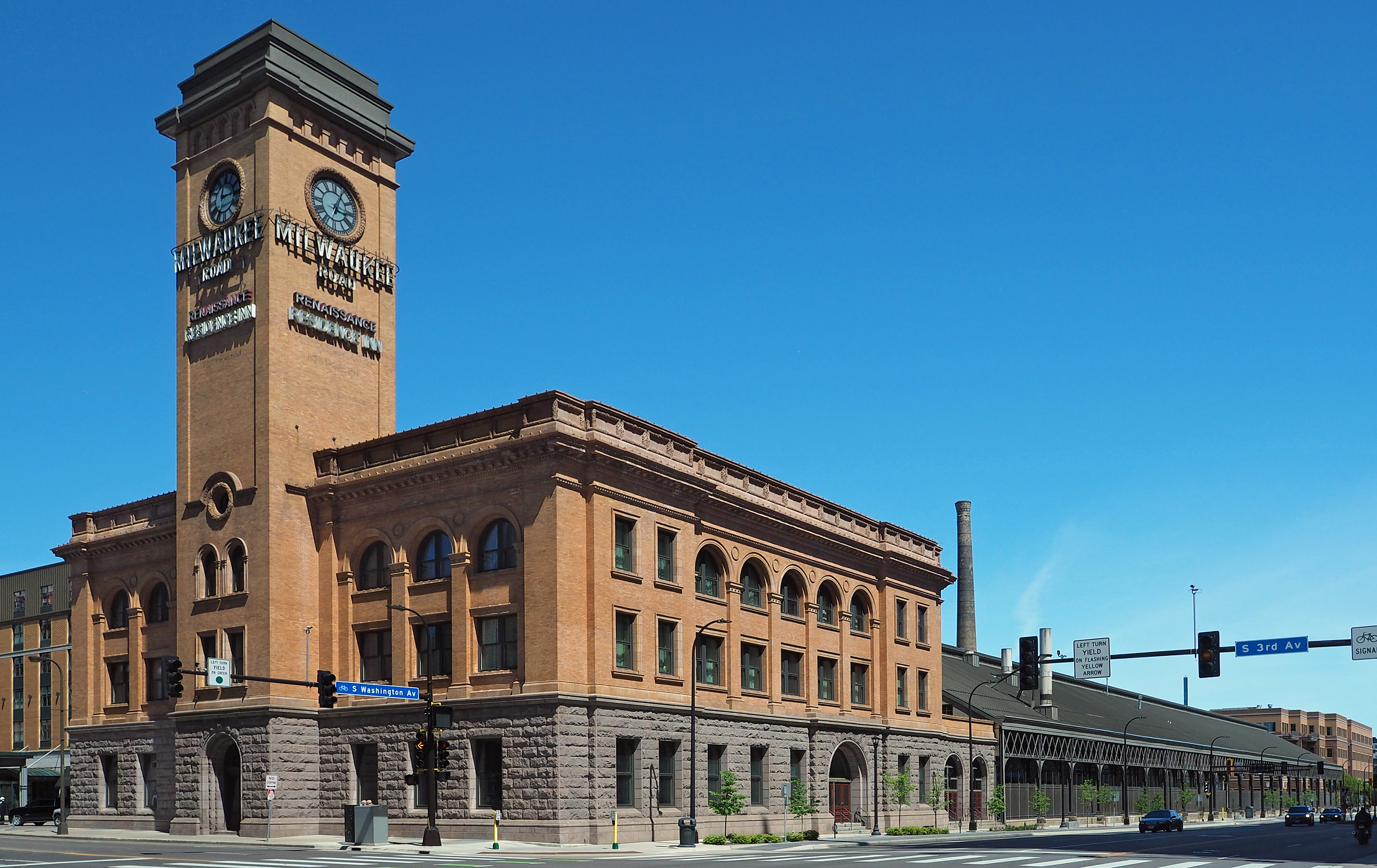
- The Milwaukee Road Depot from the west, with train shed at rear

General information
- Location: 201 Third Avenue South, Minneapolis, Minnesota 55401
- System: Former intercity passenger rail station

Services
Preceding station	Chicago, Rock Island and Pacific Railroad	Following station
St. Paul toward Teague	Teague – Minneapolis	Terminus
Terminus	Burlington, Cedar Rapids and Northern Railway	St. Paul toward Burlington
Preceding station	Milwaukee Road	Following station
St. Louis Park toward Seattle or Tacoma	Main Line	St. Paul toward Chicago
Terminus	Minneapolis – Calmar	St. Paul toward Calmar
Preceding station	Soo Line	Following station
Crystal toward Portal	Main Line	Cardigan toward Chicago
Terminus	Minneapolis – Sault Ste. Marie	St. Paul toward Sault Ste. Marie
- Chicago, Milwaukee, St. Paul and Pacific Depot, Freight House and Train Shed
- U.S. National Register of Historic Places
- Minneapolis Landmark
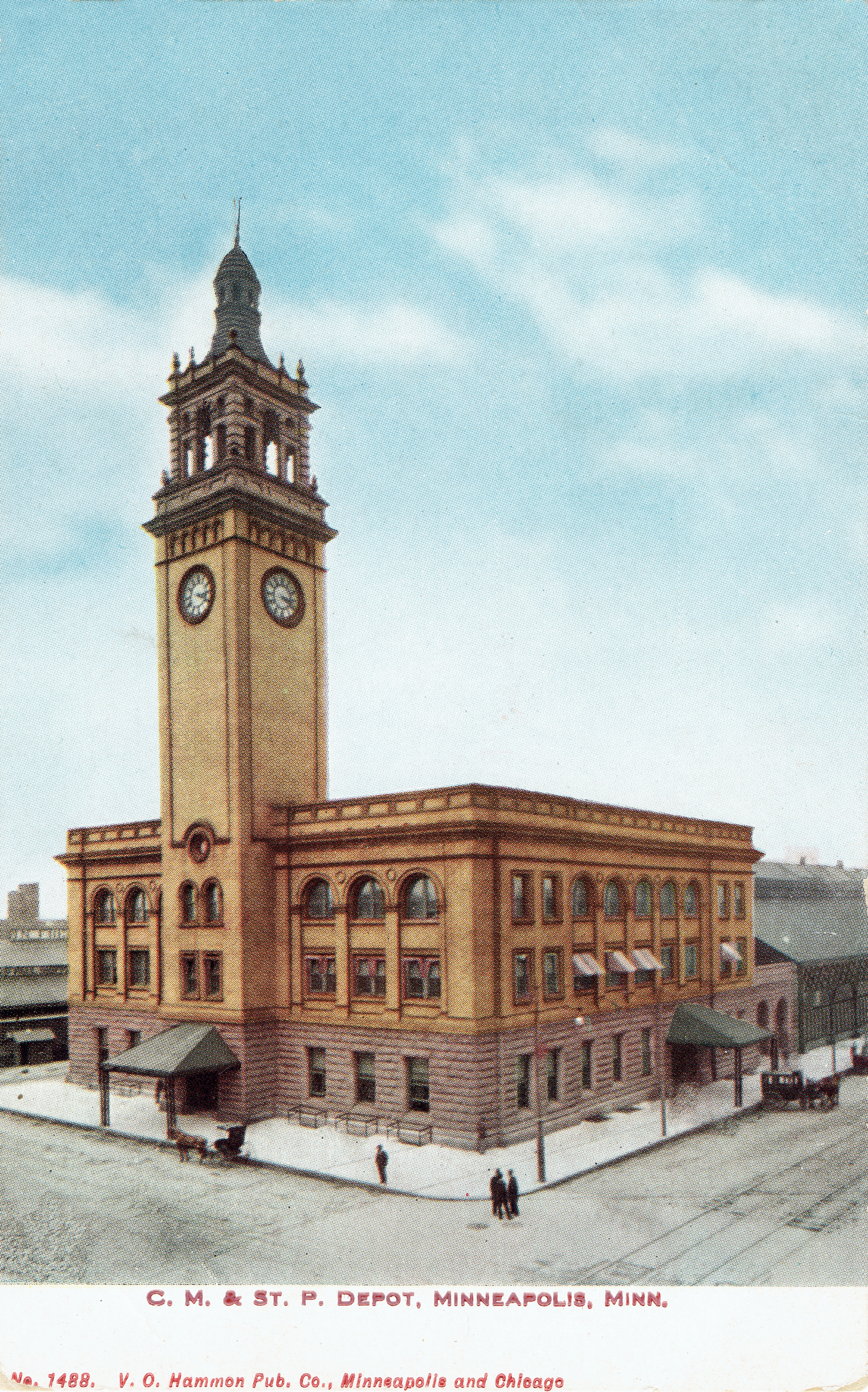
- Postcard showing the station's pinnacle.

- Location within Minnesota
- Location: 201 3rd Ave., S. Minneapolis, Minnesota, USA
- Coordinates: 44°58′47″N 93°15′44″W
- Built: 1899
- Architect: Charles S. Frost
- Architectural style: Renaissance Revival, Italianate
- NRHP reference No.: 78001542

Significant dates
- Added to NRHP: November 28, 1978
- Designated MPLSL: 1979
Location

The Chicago, Milwaukee, St. Paul and Pacific Depot Freight House and Train Shed (commonly referred to as the Milwaukee Road Depot), now officially named The Depot, is a historic railroad depot in downtown Minneapolis, Minnesota, United States. At its peak, the station served 29 trains per day. Following decline, the station was closed and eventually adapted into various other uses.

== Development ==
The Milwaukee Road had a long history in the Minneapolis area, beginning in 1865 when a predecessor railroad, the Minnesota Central, built a line from Mendota to Minneapolis. The Minnesota Central also built a line from Mendota to St. Paul in that early era. Eventually, rail lines connected Minneapolis and St. Paul with Milwaukee, Wisconsin, via Prairie du Chien, Wisconsin.

== Architecture ==
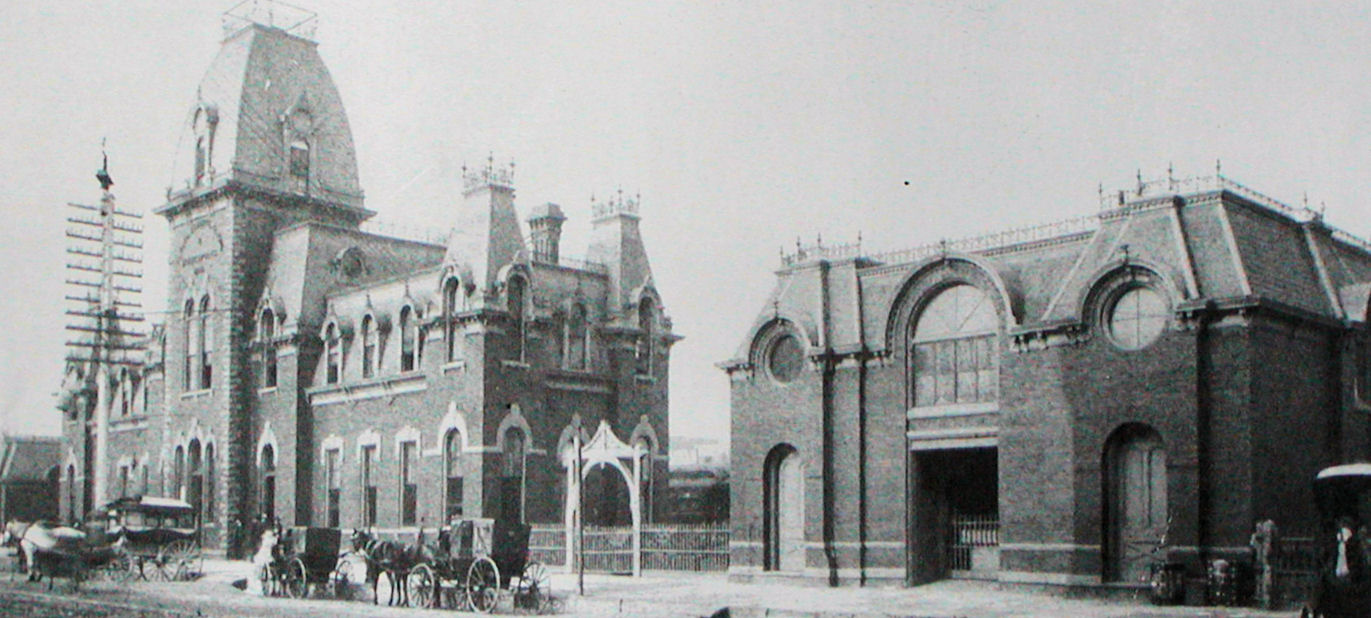
Italianate passenger station

The freight house and the first depot were built in 1879, with an Italianate architectural style. The first depot was razed after a new facility, with Renaissance Revival architecture, was built in 1899.

Originally, the facility's most distinguishing feature, the clock tower, was pinnacled and modeled after the Giralda in Seville, Spain; high winds destroyed the pinnacle in 1941 and the tower has since had a flat top.

== Operation ==
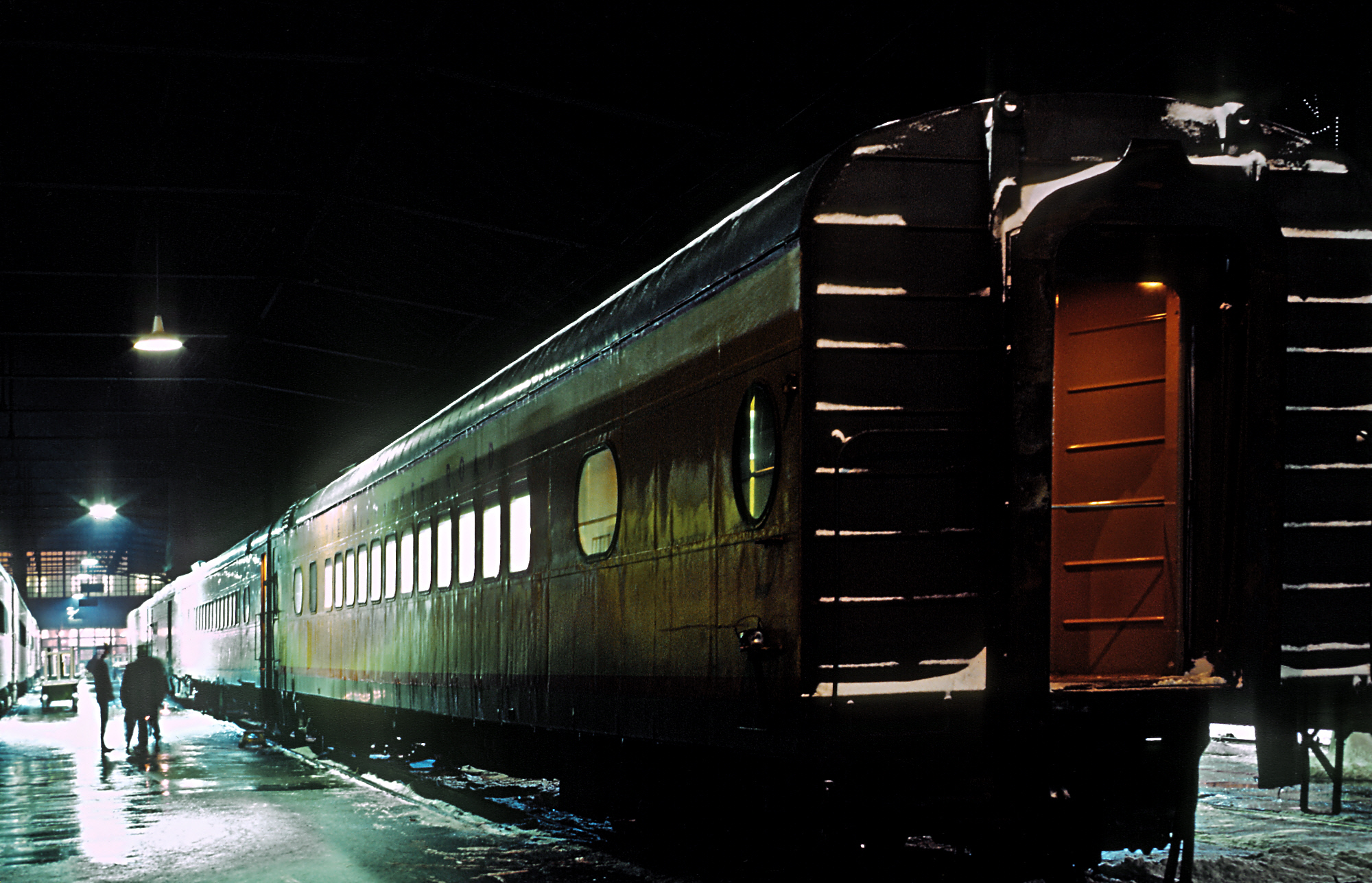
Several cars of the Olympian Hiawatha at the station on January 27, 1968

The freight house served a large percentage of less-than-carload freight arriving and departing from the Minneapolis area. Passenger traffic was also significant. In 1916, 15 passenger trains per day used the depot. Later years included the flagship Hiawathas. Rail yard facilities just south of downtown, on Hiawatha Avenue north of Lake Street, serviced the trains. By 1920, the peak of activity, 29 trains per day used the depot. Into the 1960s, the Chicago, Rock Island and Pacific Railroad (or Rock Island) operated the Twin Star Rocket bound for Houston, via Des Moines and Dallas from the station.

== Closure and reuse ==
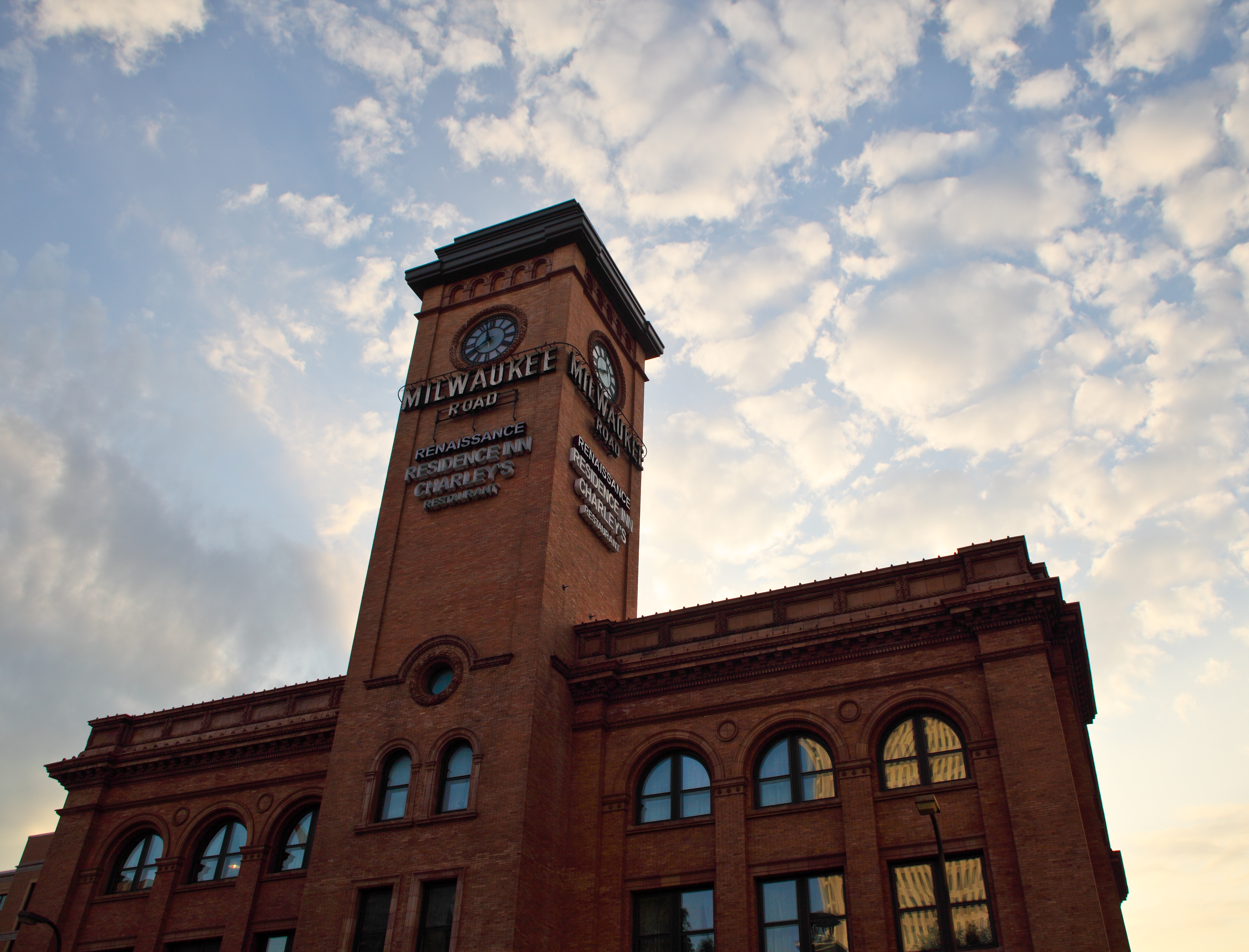
The Depot's clock tower

As passenger rail traffic decreased across the nation and freight facilities were consolidated elsewhere, the Minneapolis depot steadily lost traffic. The depot was closed in 1971 and stood vacant for many years as various redevelopment and reuse plans fizzled. In 1978, the depot and freight house were placed on the National Register of Historic Places. In 1980, rail access to the depot was severed when the Milwaukee Road abandoned most of its downtown Minneapolis trackage. In 1998, CSM Corporation began a project to reuse the depot, including a Renaissance Hotel and Residence Inn by Marriott, an indoor water park, and an enclosed outdoor ice skating rink located in the former trainshed. The project was completed in 2001. The water park was converted to additional guest rooms in 2015 during an expansion of the Renaissance Hotel.

== Other train depots in the Twin Cities ==
- Midway station (Minnesota) – The former Amtrak station serving the Twin Cities
- Saint Paul Union Depot – Former and current St. Paul passenger train destination
- Chicago Great Western Railway Station on South Washington Avenue
- Minneapolis and St. Louis Railway Station on North 5th Street
- Minneapolis Great Northern Depot – Former Minneapolis destination for Chicago and North Western, Great Northern, and Northern Pacific passenger trains
