= Red Rock Corridor =

Overview
- System: Metro Transit (Metropolitan Council)
- Status: Planned

Route
- Route type: Bus rapid transit
- Locale: Minneapolis–Saint Paul metro: Hennepin County, Ramsey County, Washington County, and Dakota County, Minnesota
- Start: Saint Paul Union Depot,
- End: Hastings
- Stations: 12 planned: Saint Paul Union Depot, Lower Afton Road, Newport, St. Paul Park, Cottage Grove (80th and Jamaica), Hastings Depot, and two more stops extending into Hastings

The Red Rock Corridor is a proposed bus rapid transit transitway in the Twin Cities of Minneapolis and Saint Paul. The route connects the metropolitan area's southeastern suburbs to downtown St. Paul, and through it to downtown Minneapolis. The transitway would originate in Hastings with planned stops in Cottage Grove, Newport and Saint Paul. The route will terminate at Saint Paul's Union Depot. From Union Depot, riders will connect with express buses, local buses, and the Metro Green Line to Minneapolis, Minneapolis–Saint Paul International Airport, and the Mall of America.

Highway 61 is the principal arterial for the Red Rock Corridor and is in a primary corridor for rail, truck, and automobile travel. By 2030, an increase of 100,000 people is projected for the southeast metro. The majority of jobs, however, will continue to be located within Minneapolis and Saint Paul. Minnesota Department of Transportation anticipates heavy congestion along Highway 61 during the morning and evening commute periods by 2030.

The Red Rock Corridor Commission was established in 1998 as a joint powers board to address transportation needs for the corridor. The commission is made up of 11 members that represent the counties and communities along the transitway. Additionally, representatives from Goodhue County, the City of Red Wing, Prairie Island Indian Community, and the Canadian Pacific Railway serve as ex-officio members.

The Red Rock Corridor Commission originally selected commuter rail as the mode for the Red Rock Corridor. In 2007, the commission determined that expanding service through a phased approach would help build demand for transit. The preferred mode of operation was updated to bus rapid transit during the Alternatives Analysis Update completed in 2014. The Red Rock Corridor Commission completed an implementation plan in 2016 focused on a phased approach to bring BRT to the southeast metro area. Strategies include improving local bus service in the near term and implementing BRT in the long term. The Red Rock Corridor Commission adopted the Implementation Plan on October 26, 2016.
