= Morris Subdivision =

Railway line in Minnesota

The Morris Subdivision or Morris Sub is a railroad line that runs about 113 miles (182 km) from Breckenridge to Willmar, Minnesota. Currently operated by BNSF Railway, this was part of the Great Northern Railway's transcontinental line from Minneapolis to Seattle, Washington. Today (as of 2010), BNSF's Northern Transcon travels up the Staples Subdivision instead, which is a more direct route to Fargo, North Dakota.

U.S. Highway 12 closely follows the line between Willmar and Benson, while Minnesota State Highway 9 follows the line the rest of the way to Breckenridge. At its northern end, the line continues toward Moorhead as the Moorhead Subdivision. At the south end, it meets the Wayzata Subdivision line to Minneapolis, and the Marshall Subdivision to Sioux Falls, South Dakota. There is also a connection to the Appleton Subdivision in Benson and a BNSF branch line in Morris, Minnesota. A Canadian Pacific Railway/Soo Line Railroad line also crosses north of Tintah, Minnesota. As of 2015, the line hosted about 11 trains per day.

Amtrak's Empire Builder, originally a Great Northern train, used to go along this route until service to the Minneapolis Great Northern Depot ended in the late 1970s and Amtrak trains were routed to Midway station in Saint Paul instead.
