= Carl Ice =

American businessman

- Born: 1956 or 1957 (age 68–69)
- Education: Kansas State University
- Occupations: President and CEO of BNSF Railway

Carl R. Ice is an American businessman. He has been the President of BNSF Railway from November 1, 2010, and President and CEO since January 1, 2014, succeeding Matthew K. Rose in the role. At the end of 2020 Ice retired after 42 years with the company and was succeeded as President and CEO by Kathryn Farmer. He remains on the BNSF Railway board.

== Career ==
Ice graduated from Kansas State University with a Bachelor's degree in industrial engineering and went to work in the Industrial Engineering Department for the Santa Fe Railroad. He subsequently held roles in the Operations, Finance, and Information Systems departments within the organization before named Vice President, Administration in 1992.

Ice was named Vice President, Carload Management in January, 1994, but was named Executive Vice President six months later.

The Santa Fe merged with the Burlington Northern on September 22, 1995, though operations of the two railroads remained separate until December 31, 1996. Ice remained with the combined corporation, BNSF Railway, as Vice President and Chief Mechanical Officer. He was promoted to Senior Vice President of Operations in 1999, where he remained before assuming the company presidency in 2010.

Ice retired from BNSF at the end of 2020.

== Personal life ==
Carl Ice is married to Mary, who is also a Kansas State University graduate. They have two adult children, Marshall and Karen.

The Ice family has frequently donated to both Kansas State University and the Kansas State athletic department. The Ice family has establishes six scholarship funds, in the fields of engineering and human ecology, as well as a student award for campus broadcasting, a Deans excellence award, and a family emergency fund. In recognition of the family's philanthropy, the university's College of Health and Human Sciences dedicated the Carl and Mary Ice Hall in 2013.

On the athletics side, the training facility for the K-State men's and women's basketball programs was named for the Ice family in 2012. The four video boards at Bill Snyder Family Stadium are also named for the family.

In December 2018, the Kansas Board of Regents approved the College of Engineering at Kansas State University to be named the Carl R. Ice College of Engineering in his honor.

In June 2021, Ice was nominated by Kansas governor Laura Kelly to the Kansas Board of Regents, alongside Lawrence attorney and former Kansas state senator Wint Winter and former Kansas City, Kansas school district superintendent Cynthia Lane. The following month, Ice was appointed to chair the committee conducting the Board's search for a new Kansas State University president, replacing the outgoing Richard Myers.

Business positions
Preceded by New title	President of BNSF Railway; 2010-2020	Succeeded by Kathryn Farmer
Preceded by Matthew K. Rose	Chief Executive Officer of BNSF Railway; 2014-2020	Succeeded by Kathryn Farmer
Awards
Preceded by E. Hunter Harrison	Railroader of the Year; 2016	Succeeded by Tom Prendergast
