= Hopeton, Oklahoma =

- Unincorporated community and Census designated place
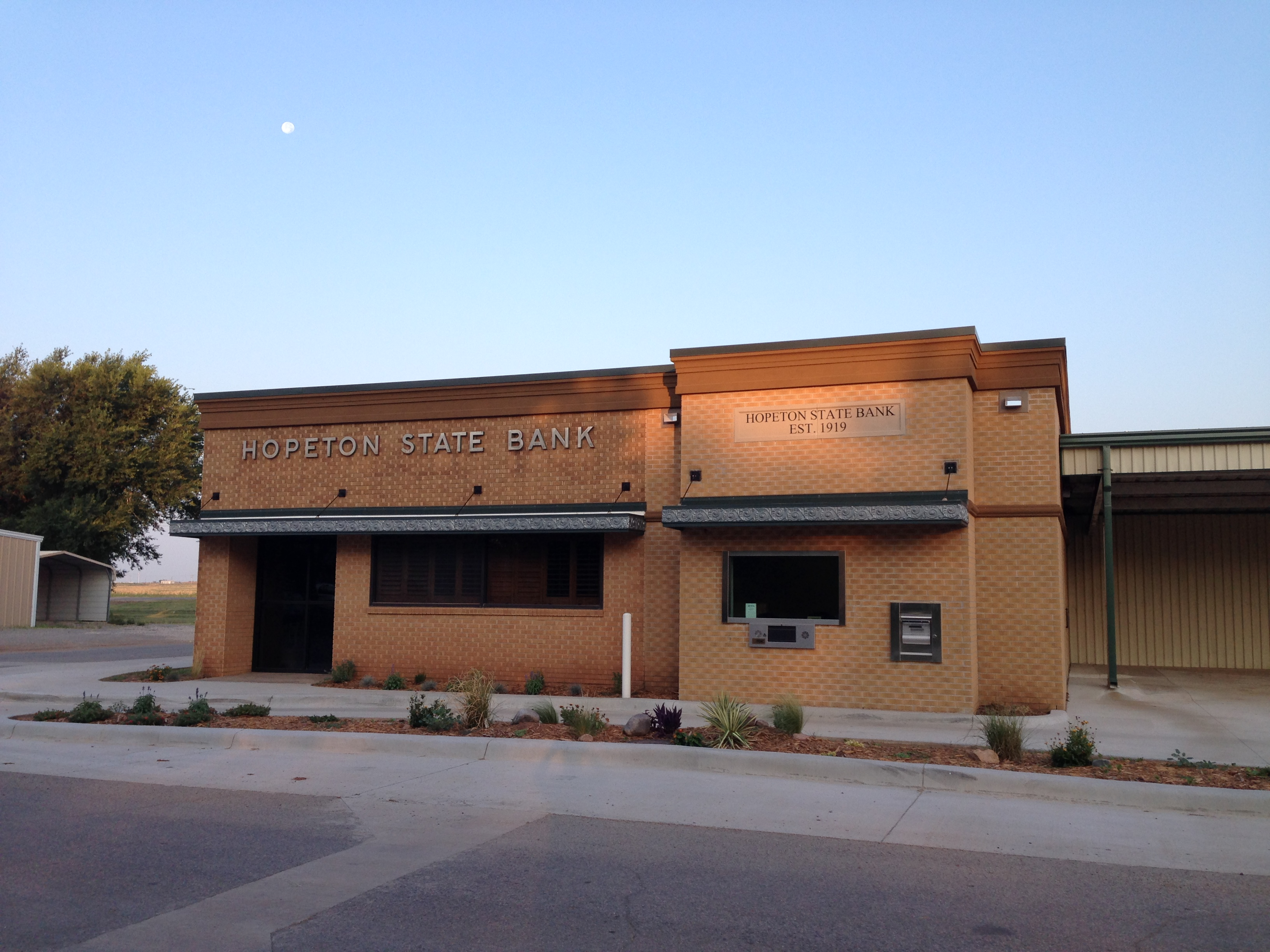
- Hopeton State Bank in 2016

- Location within Oklahoma Location within the United States
- Coordinates: 36°41′17″N 98°39′43″W
- Country: United States
- State: Oklahoma
- County: Woods

Area
  - Total: 0.49 sq mi (1.28 km^{2})
  - Land: 0.49 sq mi (1.28 km^{2})
  - Water: 0 sq mi (0.00 km^{2})
- Elevation: 1,411 ft (430 m)

Population (2020)
  - Total: 22
  - Density: 44.7/sq mi (17.24/km^{2})
- Time zone: UTC-6 (Central (CST))
  - Summer (DST): UTC-5 (CDT)
- ZIP code: 73746
- Area code: 580
- GNIS feature ID: 2805327

Hopeton is an unincorporated community and Census designated place in Woods County, Oklahoma, United States. As of the 2020 census, Hopeton had a population of 22. Hopeton is located along U.S. Route 281, 8 miles (13 km) south of Alva.

== History ==
Hopeton has a post office, with ZIP code 73746.

In 1983, the Hopeton bank was robbed by two armed suspects who fired no shots and caused no injuries. They took less than $7,500 in cash and were arrested within one hour.

A historic one-room schoolhouse is located at the north end of Hopeton.

== Demographics ==
Hopeton's ACS estimated population in 2021 was 39 people.

Historical population
Census	Pop.	Note	%±
2020	22		—
U.S. Decennial Census

=== 2020 census ===
As of the 2020 census, Hopeton had a population of 22. The median age was 34.7 years. 13.6% of residents were under the age of 18 and 13.6% of residents were 65 years of age or older. For every 100 females there were 144.4 males, and for every 100 females age 18 and over there were 137.5 males age 18 and over.

0.0% of residents lived in urban areas, while 100.0% lived in rural areas.

There were 6 households in Hopeton, of which 0.0% had children under the age of 18 living in them. Of all households, 0.0% were married-couple households, 0.0% were households with a male householder and no spouse or partner present, and 100.0% were households with a female householder and no spouse or partner present. About 50.0% of all households were made up of individuals and 16.7% had someone living alone who was 65 years of age or older.

There were 19 housing units, of which 68.4% were vacant. The homeowner vacancy rate was 0.0% and the rental vacancy rate was 14.3%.

Racial composition as of the 2020 census
Race	Number	Percent
White	22	100.0%
Black or African American	0	0.0%
American Indian and Alaska Native	0	0.0%
Asian	0	0.0%
Native Hawaiian and Other Pacific Islander	0	0.0%
Some other race	0	0.0%
Two or more races	0	0.0%
Hispanic or Latino (of any race)	0	0.0%

== Economy ==
Hopeton State Bank is an independently-owned bank located in Hopeton, chartered in 1919.

The Farmers Cooperative Association of Alva operates a seasonal grain elevator in Hopeton. It is located along the BNSF railway tracks on the Avard Subdivision.
