= Avard, Oklahoma =

- Census-designated place
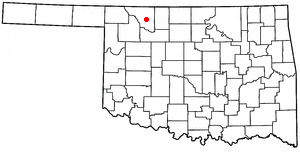
- Location of Avard, Oklahoma
- Coordinates: 36°41′57″N 98°47′24″W
- Country: United States
- State: Oklahoma
- County: Woods

Area
  - Total: 0.10 sq mi (0.27 km^{2})
  - Land: 0.10 sq mi (0.27 km^{2})
  - Water: 0 sq mi (0.00 km^{2})
- Elevation: 1,476 ft (450 m)

Population (2020)
  - Total: 11
  - Density: 105.2/sq mi (40.62/km^{2})
- Time zone: UTC-6 (Central (CST))
  - Summer (DST): UTC-5 (CDT)
- FIPS code: 40-03550
- GNIS feature ID: 1089768

Avard is a current settlement and former incorporated town located in Woods County, Oklahoma, United States. It is southwest of Alva, and northeast of Waynoka. As of the 2020 census, the community had 11 residents. After initial growth, Avard began declining in the 1930s.

== History ==
The post office was first established in Avard on June 1, 1895 and the town was incorporated in 1904 where the tracks of the Frisco, extending westward from Enid, tied into the line of the Santa Fe. The town was named for Isabell Avard Todd, the wife of Robert Todd. The town was served by the Southern Arkansas Railway (Santa Fe) and Arkansas Valley and Western Railroad (Frisco).

Avard had mercantile establishments, two hotels, a bank, a livestock auction, and an elevator. A weekly newspaper, the Avard Tribune operated from 1904 to 1918. It was a major cattle shipping point for the area.

A total of 250 people lived in the town in 1909.

It was an important rail transfer point for freight and passengers from 1910 to 1930.

Avard continued to grow until the mid-1930s. Then the town started to decline due to the economic depression, dust storms, farm consolidation, and changing travel habits. Additionally, the town was struck by tornadoes in both 1943 and 1944.

The post office lasted until November 22, 1963. As of January 1, 2010, Avard was disincorporated, although it still appears as a Census-Designated Place.

Today, only an elevator and church are left in operation. There are also a few unused store buildings.

But the area still has important rail connections, including the BNSF Railway’s Avard Subdivision which runs from Avard to Tulsa. It is also the location of the Avard Regional Industrial Rail Park, which is a rail-served industrial park given site-certification by the BNSF to ensure the location is ready for rapid development.

== Geography ==
Avard is located at 36°41′57″N 98°47′24″W (36.699116, -98.790078).

According to the United States Census Bureau, the town has a total area of 0.2 square miles (0.52 km^{2}), all land.

== Demographics ==
Historical population
Census	Pop.	Note	%±
1910	170		—
1920	147		−13.5%
1930	212		44.2%
1940	126		−40.6%
1950	96		−23.8%
1960	56		−41.7%
1970	59		5.4%
1980	51		−13.6%
1990	37		−27.5%
2000	26		−29.7%
2020	11		—
U.S. Decennial Census

=== 2020 census ===
As of the 2020 census, Avard had a population of 11. The median age was 45.3 years. 27.3% of residents were under the age of 18 and 18.2% of residents were 65 years of age or older. For every 100 females there were 22.2 males, and for every 100 females age 18 and over there were 0.0 males age 18 and over.

0.0% of residents lived in urban areas, while 100.0% lived in rural areas.

There were 7 households in Avard, of which 57.1% had children under the age of 18 living in them. Of all households, 57.1% were married-couple households, 14.3% were households with a male householder and no spouse or partner present, and 28.6% were households with a female householder and no spouse or partner present. About 14.3% of all households were made up of individuals and 0.0% had someone living alone who was 65 years of age or older.

There were 11 housing units, of which 36.4% were vacant. The homeowner vacancy rate was 0.0% and the rental vacancy rate was 100.0%.

Racial composition as of the 2020 census
Race	Number	Percent
White	10	90.9%
Black or African American	0	0.0%
American Indian and Alaska Native	0	0.0%
Asian	0	0.0%
Native Hawaiian and Other Pacific Islander	0	0.0%
Some other race	0	0.0%
Two or more races	1	9.1%
Hispanic or Latino (of any race)	0	0.0%

=== 2000 census ===
As of the census of 2000, there were 26 people, 13 households, and 6 families residing in the town. The population density was 126.7 inhabitants per square mile (48.9/km^{2}). There were 17 housing units at an average density of 82.8 per square mile (32.0/km^{2}). The racial makeup of the town was 96.15% White, and 3.85% from two or more races.

There were 13 households, out of which 30.8% had children under the age of 18 living with them, 46.2% were married couples living together, and 53.8% were non-families. 46.2% of all households were made up of individuals, and 15.4% had someone living alone who was 65 years of age or older. The average household size was 2.00 and the average family size was 3.00.

In the town, the population was spread out, with 19.2% under the age of 18, 7.7% from 18 to 24, 26.9% from 25 to 44, 26.9% from 45 to 64, and 19.2% who were 65 years of age or older. The median age was 42 years. For every 100 females, there were 116.7 males. For every 100 females age 18 and over, there were 110.0 males.

The median income for a household in the town was $23,750, and the median income for a family was $40,000. Males had a median income of $23,750 versus $14,583 for females. The per capita income for the town was $11,757. There were no families and 17.1% of the population living below the poverty line, including no under eighteens and 50.0% of those over 64.
