= Matthew K. Rose =

American businessman (born 1960)

- Born: 1959 (age 66–67); Salina, Kansas
- Education: University of Missouri
- Board member of: AT&T

Matthew K. Rose (born 1960 in Salina, Kansas) is the former chairman and CEO of Burlington Northern Santa Fe Corp., serving in that role from 2002 to December 31, 2013. In December 2013, Rose's role was shifted to that of executive chairman, renewing speculation he might be in line to replace Warren Buffett at Berkshire's helm.

== Background ==
He attended the University of Missouri and is a member of Lambda Chi Alpha fraternity. Rose has a wife, Lisa, and two children.

Rose is a member of the National Executive Board of the Boy Scouts of America, the organization's governing body.

Rose was named the Railroader of the Year by Railway Age for 2010.

== See also ==
- List of chief executive officers

Business positions
| Preceded by Robert Krebs | Chief Executive Officer of BNSF Railway; 2002-2013 | Succeeded by Carl Ice |
Awards
| Preceded by Michael J. Ward | Railroader of the Year; 2010 | Succeeded by Charles Moorman |
