= Kathryn Farmer =

American businesswoman

- Born: c. 1970
- Education: Texas Christian University (BBA, MBA)
- Occupations: Senior executive, BNSF Railway
- Years active: 1996–present

Kathryn M. "Katie" Thompson Farmer (born c. 1970) is an American railroad executive. In January 2021, she became the first woman chief executive of a Class I railroad, succeeding Carl Ice at BNSF Railway.

== Biography ==
Kathryn M. Farmer graduated from Texas Christian University with a Bachelor of Business Administration and an MBA in Finance.

Farmer joined Burlington Northern Railroad in 1992 as a management trainee. She has spent her entire career at BNSF (Burlington Northern merged with Santa Fe in 1996 to become BNSF and became wholly owned by Berkshire Hathaway in 2010), holding positions in operations, marketing and finance.

Farmer was appointed Executive Vice President Operations in September 2018. In September 2020, BNSF announced that she would succeed Carl Ice as President and Chief Executive Officer, and also lead BNSF's Board of Directors, effective January 1, 2021. The appointment made her the first woman to lead a major railway operator in North America.

Matt Igoe took over her vacated role of Executive Vice President Operations.

Farmer's appointment as CEO coincided with BNSF's milestone anniversary, marking the company's evolution since its formation in 1995 through mergers and acquisitions. Upon her appointment as chief executive, investor Warren Buffett publicly expressed confidence in Farmer's leadership abilities.

Farmer is a member of the Board of Trustees of Texas Christian University.

Farmer was named Railway Age's 2023 Railroader of the Year. In giving the award, the magazine pointed to how Farmer "took the throttle of North America’s largest railroad, in terms of both route-miles and revenue, during unprecedented times, in the midst of a global pandemic."

Business positions
New title	President and CEO of BNSF; 2021-	Incumbent
Preceded by Carl Ice	CEO of BNSF; 2020	Incumbent
