= Wayzata Subdivision =

Railway line in Minnesota

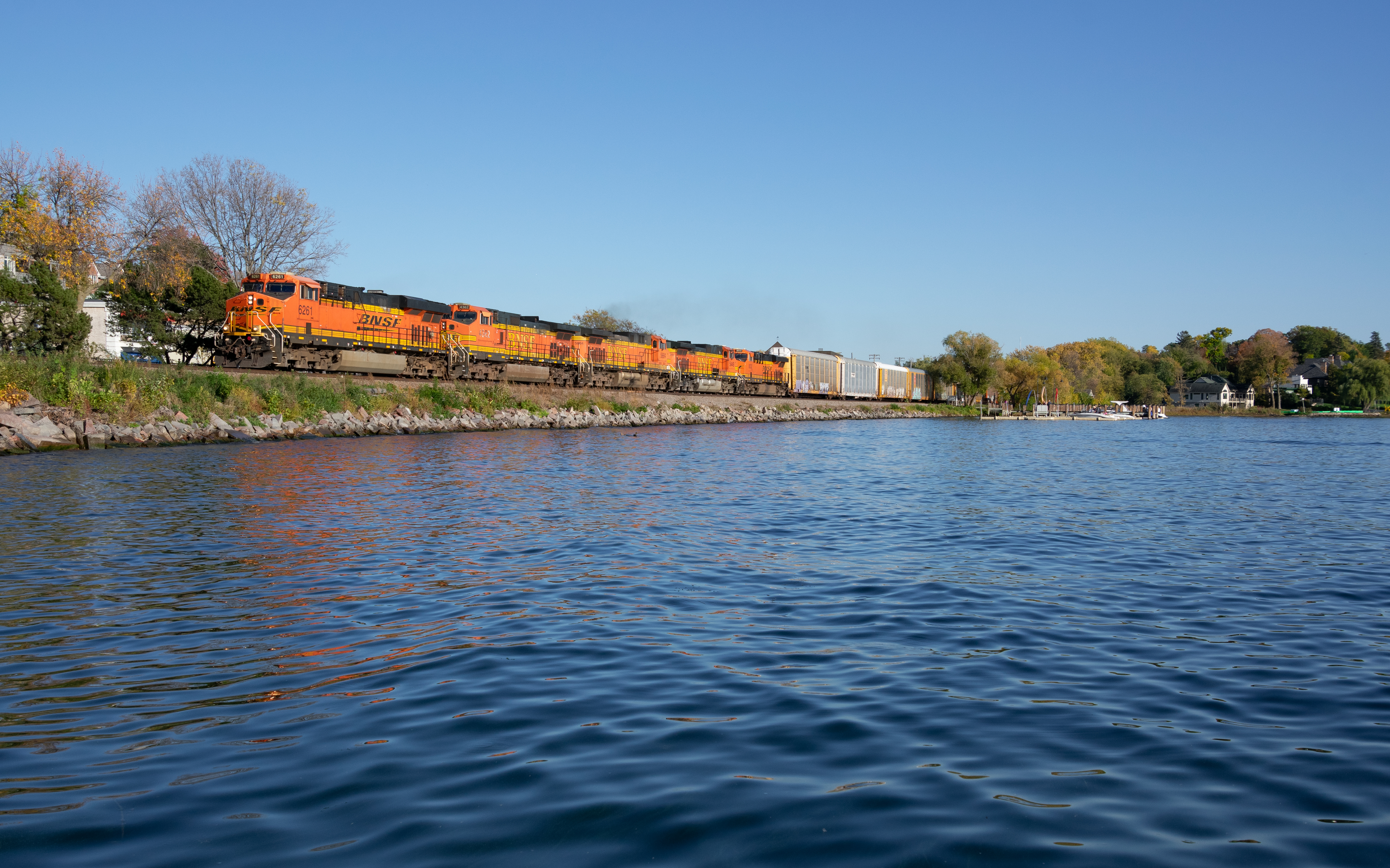
- The daily Northtown Yard to Laurel, MT manifest heads west along the shore of Lake Minnetonka in Wayzata, the namesake town of the sub.

Overview
- Owner: BNSF Railway

Technical
- Line length: 93 mi (150 km)
- Track gauge: 1,435 mm (4 ft 8 1/2 in) standard gauge

The Wayzata Subdivision or Wayzata Sub is a railway line that runs about 93 miles (150 km) from Willmar to Minneapolis, Minnesota. Currently operated by BNSF Railway, this was part of the Great Northern Railway's transcontinental line from Minneapolis to Seattle, Washington. Today, BNSF's Northern Transcon travels up the Staples Subdivision instead, which is a more direct route to Fargo, North Dakota. West of Target Field station the Wayzata Sub sees about 4-6 trains a day, consisting of manifest, grain, and ethanol traffic. The Wayzata Sub also occasionally sees other commodities such as coal and oil trains, and can sometimes receive intermodal or Amtrak reroutes when needed.

U.S. Highway 12 closely follows the Wayzata Subdivision. At its western end in Willmar, there are connections to the Morris Subdivision to Breckenridge, Minnesota and the Marshall Subdivision to Sioux City, Iowa. At Garretson, South Dakota a wye track goes to Sioux Falls, South Dakota. The line meets the Midway Subdivision in Minneapolis at the eastern end.

Some Great Northern passenger trains ran along this line, though service was cut back to just the Empire Builder upon the formation of Amtrak in 1971. Service to the Minneapolis Great Northern Depot stopped in the late 1978, when trains were shifted to Midway station in Saint Paul. The Empire Builder changed to its modern routing along the Staples Subdivision in late 1979 when the North Coast Hiawatha ended service.

There wasn't any passenger service on the line from that time until November 2009 when the Northstar commuter rail line began operation. The commuter train's southern terminus at Target Field station is at the extreme eastern end of the line. The Cedar Lake Trail bicycle route (and its continuation, the Hutchinson Spur) runs parallel to the Wayzata Sub from St. Louis Park into downtown Minneapolis along former Great Northern and Minneapolis and St. Louis Railway right-of-way. The proposed Metro Green Line Extension light rail line will briefly parallel the Wayzata Subdivision from the vicinity of Lyndale Junction to Cedar Lake Junction. Once in a while, the Empire Builder today will use the old routing when the Staples Sub is out of service, most recently in February 2022, when a derailment in Frazee, MN caused the train to traverse its original route through Minnesota once again.
