= Avard Subdivision =

Railway line in Oklahoma

The BNSF Avard Subdivision runs 177 miles (285 km) of track between Tulsa, Oklahoma, starting at milepost (MP) 425.2, to Avard, Oklahoma, MP 602, where it meets the BNSF Panhandle Subdivision.

== History ==
The Avard Sub was built by the St. Louis–San Francisco Railway (SLSF) also known as the Frisco. It was built in the late 1890s into the turn of the century. In the Frisco days it was separated by two subdivisions. From Tulsa to Perry, Oklahoma, was known as the Perry Sub, where it crossed the interlocking with the Atchison, Topeka and Santa Fe Railway (ATSF). It paralleled the ATSF for about six miles and then the Frisco turned to the west. Then from Perry to Avard was known as Avard Sub. The ATSF had trackage rights on the subdivision because of ATSF's intermodal business from Los Angeles, CA, to Memphis, TN.

In the early 1980s, nearly 100 years later, the Burlington Northern Railroad (BN) merged and bought all of the Frisco. The ATSF still had trackage rights but the two subdivisions (Perry & Avard Subs) were combined into one to form all 177 miles of the Avard Sub. Then in 1995, the BN and the ATSF were merged to form the BNSF Railway.

=== 1995 to present ===
After the merger the Avard Sub and all of its 100 years of existence, was track warrant control (TWC). There were no signals except at interlockings and between Black Bear (ATSF interlocking at Perry, OK), and just outside Perry. There was only about 20 to 30 trains a day operating on the Avard Sub, mostly intermodal traffic. Then in 2012, BNSF signed an agreement with Asian markets to have containers back in Asia (China, Japan, Korea, Vietnam, etc.), in 24 days. This meant more intermodal traffic. With the growing demands of crude oil and other general freight trains, BNSF was short on locomotives and train crews. It was crucial to upgrade the Avard Sub. CTC (centralized traffic control) and longer sidings were needed. In 2014 the Avard Sub was upgraded with CTC, PTC (positive train control), longer sidings, and a maximum speed of 70 mph for all qualified intermodal trains.

In February 2018, BNSF announced their intention to add a new siding to the Avard Sub near Hopeton, OK. The work was completed by Millstone Weber in August 2018.

== Trains ==
There are several types of trains that run today on the Avard Sub.

- Intermodal Trains (S, Q, & Z trains)
- Freight (Manifest) Trains (H & M trains)
- Unit Trains (Grain, corn syrup, and rock trains)

Intermodals are good to run 70 mph, however there are a lot of permanent speed restrictions across the Avard.
