= Coeur d'Alene Subdivision =

Railway line in Idaho

The Coeur d'Alene Subdivision is a railway line running about 12.3 miles (19.8 km) from Coeur d'Alene, ID to Hauser Junction near Hauser, ID. It is operated by BNSF Railway.

The territory is track warrant controlled.

BNSF has since removed the line from Coeur d'Alene to Hutter, ID. Currently the subdivision is currently only 8.4 miles (13.5 km) but the rail line is still timetabled to Coeur d'Alene
