= Moorhead Subdivision =

Railway line in Minnesota

The Moorhead Subdivision or Moorhead Sub is a railroad line which runs from Moorhead to Breckenridge, Minnesota. It briefly crosses the border into North Dakota around Wahpeton, across the Red River from Breckenridge. Currently operated by BNSF Railway, this was part of the Great Northern Railway's transcontinental line from Minneapolis to Seattle, Washington.

Today (as of 2010), BNSF's Northern Transcon travels up the Staples Subdivision instead, which is a more direct route between Minneapolis–Saint Paul and Fargo, North Dakota. Amtrak's Empire Builder, formerly a Great Northern Railway train, was shifted to take the Staples Subdivision in the late 1970s.

U.S. Highway 75 closely follows the rail line. The Red River Valley and Western Railroad interchanges with BNSF in Wahpeton. In the north, the line meets BNSF's KO Subdivision.
