= BNSF Railway =

American Class I freight railroad

- System map (trackage rights and former Montana Rail Link tracks in purple)

- BNSF train going through Clarendon Hills, Illinois

Overview
- Parent company: Berkshire Hathaway
- Headquarters: Fort Worth, Texas
- Reporting mark: BNSF
- Founder: Robert Krebs
- Locale: Western, Midwestern and Southern United States, Western Canada
- Dates of operation: September 22, 1995–present
- Predecessor: Atchison, Topeka and Santa Fe Railway; Burlington Northern Railroad

Technical
- Track gauge: 4 ft 8 1/2 in (1,435 mm) standard gauge
- Length: 33,400 miles (53,800 km)

Other
- Website: bnsf.com

Burlington Northern Santa Fe Railway (reporting mark BNSF) is the largest of the many freight railroads in the United States. One of six North American Class I railroads, BNSF has 36,000 employees, 33,400 miles (53,800 km) of track in 28 states, and over 8,000 locomotives. It has three transcontinental routes that provide rail connections between the western and eastern United States. BNSF trains traveled over 169 million miles (272 million kilometers) in 2010, more than any other North American railroad.

The BNSF Railway Company is the principal operating subsidiary of parent company Burlington Northern Santa Fe, LLC. Headquartered in Fort Worth, Texas, the railroad's parent company is a wholly owned subsidiary of Berkshire Hathaway Inc., of Omaha, Nebraska. The current CEO is Kathryn Farmer.

According to corporate press releases, BNSF Railway is among the top transporters of intermodal freight in North America. It also hauls bulk cargo, including coal.

The creation of BNSF started with the formation of a holding company on September 22, 1995. This new holding company purchased the Atchison, Topeka and Santa Fe Railway (often called the "Santa Fe") and Burlington Northern Railroad, and formally merged the railways into the Burlington Northern and Santa Fe Railway on December 31, 1996. On January 24, 2005, the railroad's name was officially changed to BNSF Railway Company using the initials of its original name. Warren Buffett's Berkshire Hathaway acquired BNSF Railway in February 2010, obtaining all of its shares and taking the company private.

BNSF and its chief competitor, the Union Pacific Railroad, have a duopoly on all transcontinental freight rail lines in the Western, Midwestern and West South Central United States and share trackage rights over thousands of miles of track.

== History ==
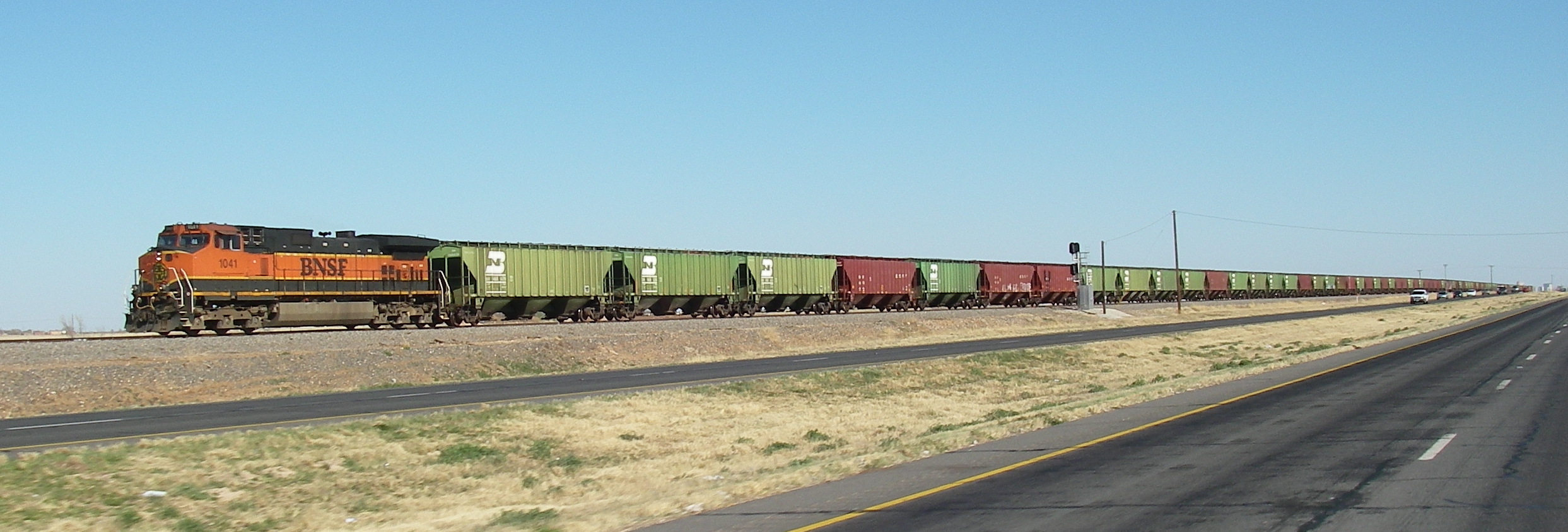
BNSF Dash 9-44CW #1041 leading a manifest freight train northwest of Shallowater, Texas, running on former ATSF railroad tracks that run parallel to U.S. Route 84 as they cross the high plains of the Llano Estacado. Immediately behind the locomotive are cars painted in the old Burlington Northern livery.

BNSF's history dates to 1849, when the Aurora Branch Railroad in Illinois and the Pacific Railroad of Missouri were formed by a group of millers who were granted a charter to build a 12 miles (19 km)-long railroad that connected Aurora with the Galena & Chicago Union Rail Road. The Aurora Branch eventually grew into the Chicago, Burlington and Quincy Railroad (CB&Q), a major component of successor Burlington Northern. Part of the Pacific Railroad became the St. Louis-San Francisco Railway (Frisco).

The Atchison, Topeka and Santa Fe Railway (ATSF) was chartered in 1859. It built one of the first transcontinental railroads in North America, linking Chicago and Southern California; major branches led to Texas, Denver, and San Francisco. The Interstate Commerce Commission denied a proposed merger with the Southern Pacific Transportation Company in the 1980s.

The Burlington Northern Railroad (BN) was created in 1970 through the consolidation of the Chicago, Burlington and Quincy Railroad, the Great Northern Railway, the Northern Pacific Railway and the Spokane, Portland and Seattle Railway. It absorbed the St. Louis-San Francisco Railway (Frisco) in 1980. Its main lines included Chicago-Seattle with branches to Texas (ex-Burlington) and Birmingham, Alabama (ex-Frisco), and access to the low-sulfur coal of Wyoming's Powder River Basin.

The city of Burlington, Iowa is the namesake of Burlington in each of Chicago, Burlington and Quincy Railroad, Burlington Northern Railroad, and BNSF.

=== BN-ATSF merger ===
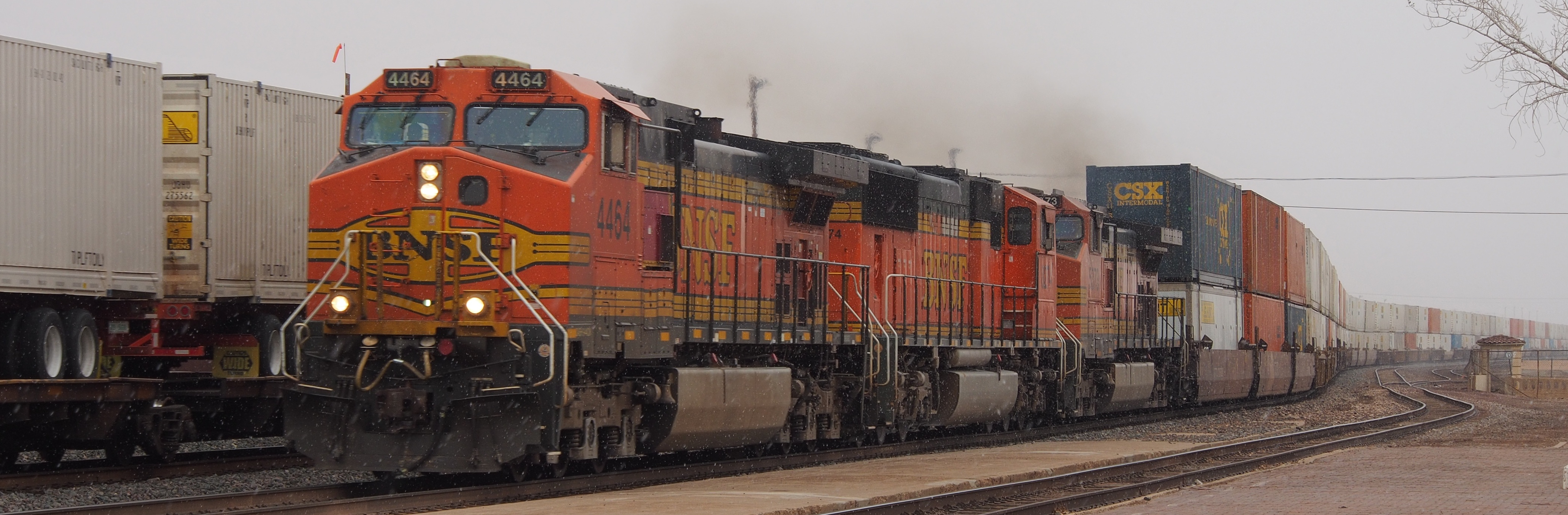
GE Dash 9-44CW 4464 leads a container train through Winslow, Arizona, in the rain on the BNSF Southern Transcon in Northern Arizona.

On June 30, 1994, BN and ATSF announced plans to merge. They were the largest and smallest (by track mileage) of the "Super Seven", the seven largest of the then-twelve U.S. Class I railroads. The long-rumored announcement was delayed by a disagreement over the disposition of Santa Fe Pacific Gold Corporation, a gold mining subsidiary that ATSF agreed to sell to stockholders. This announcement began the next wave of mergers, as the "Super Seven" were merged down to four in the next five years. The Illinois Central Railroad and Kansas City Southern Railway (KCS), two of the five "small" Class Is, announced on July 19 that the former would buy the latter, but this plan was called off on October 25. The Union Pacific Railroad (UP), another major Western system, started a bidding war with BN for control of the SF on October 5. The UP gave up on January 31, 1995, paving the way for the BN-ATSF merger. Subsequently, the UP acquired the Southern Pacific Transportation Company (SP) in 1996, and Eastern U.S. systems CSX Transportation and Norfolk Southern Railway split Conrail in 1999.

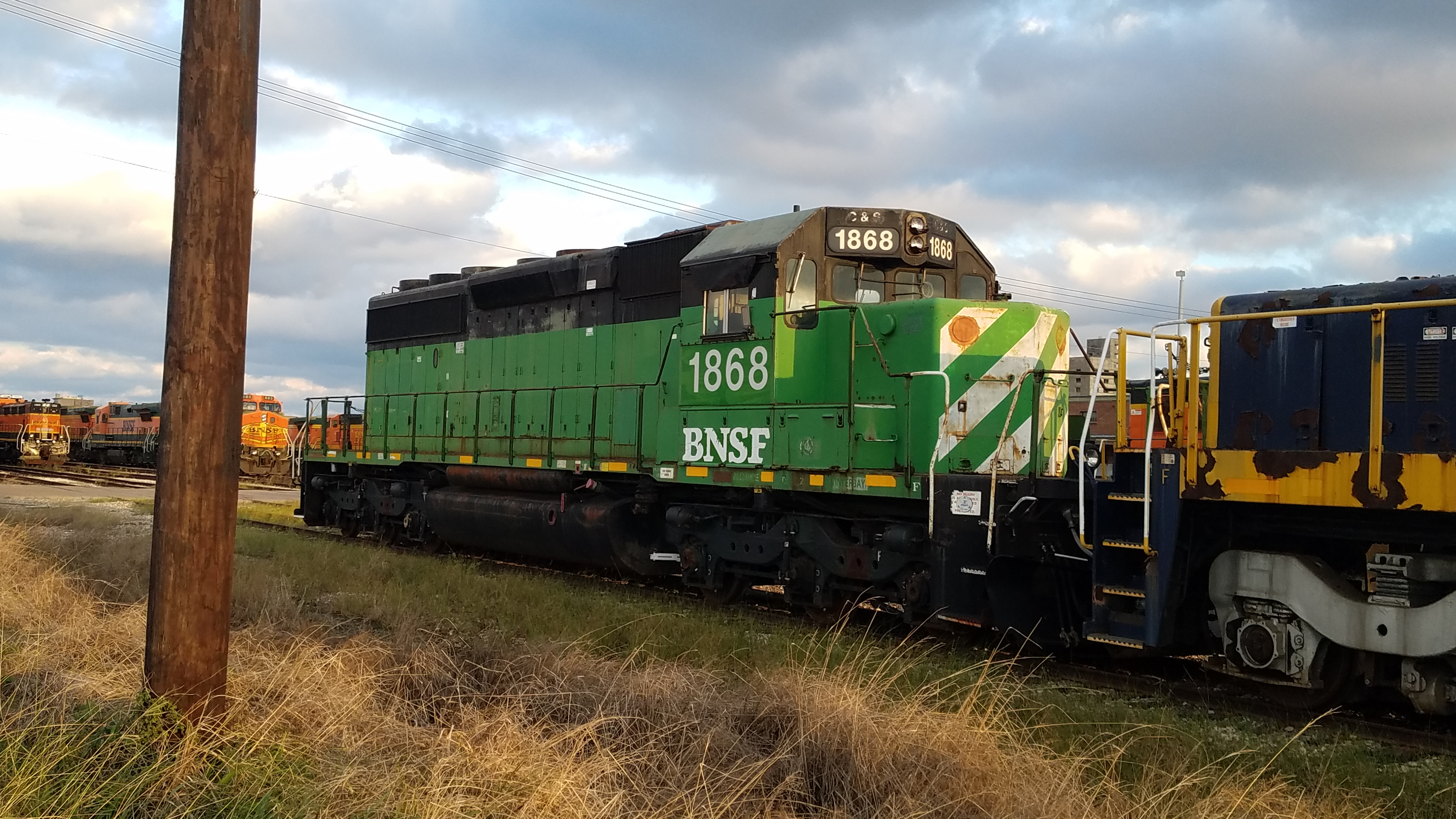
Ex. Burlington Northern BNSF SD40-2, sitting in Galveston, Texas, alongside many other locomotives.

On February 7, 1995, BN and ATSF heads Gerald Grinstein and Robert D. Krebs announced that shareholders had approved the plan, which would save overhead costs and combine BN's coal and ATSF's intermodal strengths. Although the two systems complemented each other with little overlap, in contrast to the Santa Fe-Southern Pacific merger, which failed because it would have eliminated competition in many areas of the Southwest, BN and ATSF came to agreements with most other Class Is to keep them from opposing the merger. UP was satisfied with a single segment of trackage rights from Abilene, Kansas, to Superior, Nebraska, which BN and ATSF had both served. KCS gained haulage rights to several Midwest locations, including Omaha, East St. Louis, and Memphis, in exchange for BNSF getting similar access to New Orleans. SP, initially requesting far-reaching trackage rights throughout the West, soon agreed to a reduced plan, whereby SP acquired trackage rights on ATSF for intermodal and automotive traffic to Chicago, and other trackage rights on ATSF in Kansas, south to Texas, and between Colorado and Texas. In exchange, SP assigned BNSF trackage rights over the former Chicago, Rock Island and Pacific Railroad between El Paso and Topeka and haulage rights to the Mexican border at Eagle Pass, Texas. Regional Toledo, Peoria and Western Railway also obtained trackage rights over BN from Peoria to Galesburg, Illinois, a BN hub where it could interchange with SP (which had rights on BN dating from 1990). The Interstate Commerce Commission (ICC) approved the BNSF merger on July 20, 1995 (with final approval on August 23), less than a month before UP announced on August 3 that it would acquire SP. Parents Burlington Northern Inc. and Santa Fe Pacific Corporation were acquired on September 22, 1995, by the new Burlington Northern Santa Fe Corporation. The merger of the operating companies was held up by issues with unions; ATSF merged on December 31, 1996, into BN, which was renamed the Burlington Northern and Santa Fe Railway Company.

=== Effect of UP-SP merger ===
Union Pacific's merger with Southern Pacific further enlarged the combined BNSF network. Unlike BN and ATSF, UP and SP had significant overlap, where the end of competition between the two risked creating a monopoly for freight carriage in much of the West. UP and BNSF announced in late September 1995 that, in exchange for BNSF not opposing the merger, it would obtain ownership of 335 miles (539 km) of line and about 3,500 miles (5,600 km) of trackage rights to reach these "two-to-one" shippers. Significant additions included rights over SP's Central Corridor from Denver via the Moffat Tunnel and Salt Lake City, and over Donner Pass, to the San Francisco Bay Area, with an alternate route through the Feather River Canyon along UP. The ATSF trackage in California's Central Valley was linked to BN's line into Oregon, through trackage rights over UP between Stockton and Keddie and acquisition of UP's section of the "Inside Gateway" to the beginning of BN trackage at Bieber. In Texas, BNSF received rights in several directions from the Houston area: west over UP to San Antonio, with a branch to Waco, and continuing over SP to Eagle Pass (replacing the haulage rights they had just obtained); south over UP to Brownsville; east over SP to New Orleans (including the purchase of this line east of Lake Charles); and northeast over SP to Memphis with a branch on UP to Little Rock. Ownership of a short connection between Waxahachie and Dallas also went from UP to BNSF. UP, in return, got a few short sections of trackage rights over BNSF, mainly connecting the SP at Chemult to the UP at Bend, Oregon, and connecting the SP at Mojave, California with existing UP rights on ATSF at Barstow, California. On April 18, 1996, UP, BNSF, and the Chemical Manufacturers Association entered into an agreement giving BNSF rights over the UP line between Houston and East St. Louis, paralleling the Houston-Memphis SP line, and allowing BNSF to participate in the UP's plan for directional running, in which each line would serve through trains in only one direction. The Surface Transportation Board, successor to the ICC, approved the UP-SP merger on July 3, and UP control of SP took effect on September 11, 1996. BNSF trackage rights operations began on the Central Corridor on October 10, and soon thereafter on other lines.

BNSF continued projects started by its predecessors, most notably BN's work on reopening Stampede Pass. BN had closed Stampede Pass, the Northern Pacific Railway's main line across Washington, in 1984, in favor of the ex-Great Northern Railway's Stevens Pass. BN never abandoned the line and began rehabilitating it in early 1996, and the route reopened in early December, relieving the crowded Stevens Pass. The ex-ATSF main line, now known as the Southern Transcon, has also seen steady work to add tracks, giving BNSF more capacity on this major intermodal route.

=== Attempted merger with CN ===
On December 20, 1999, BNSF and the recently privatized Canadian National Railway announced plans to combine as subsidiaries of a new holding company, North American Railways, which would control about 50,000 miles (80,000 km) of railroad. With CN's lines primarily in Canada and, through subsidiary Illinois Central Railroad, on a north–south corridor near BNSF's eastern edge, the two systems had little overlap. The combination would have benefited both companies by expanding available cash for capacity improvements and allowing for longer single-system movements. Shippers and the Surface Transportation Board expressed concern and surprise about the timing, since the merger that produced BNSF had been the only one in the 1990s that did not cause severe deterioration in service. On March 17, 2000, the STB imposed a 15-month moratorium on mergers involving any two Class I railroads, citing widespread opposition not only to the merger but its effects, likely starting the final round of mergers into two big systems. BNSF and CN immediately turned to the U.S. Court of Appeals, which on July 14 ruled that the STB's right to regulate mergers allowed a moratorium, and the two railroads called off the merger. The STB released its final rules on June 11, 2001, requiring any new application to merge two Class I railroads, with the exception of smaller Kansas City Southern Railway, to demonstrate that competition would be preserved and address effects of defensive moves by other carriers. No further Class I mergers would take place until the merger between Kansas City Southern and Canadian Pacific on April 14, 2023, creating the Canadian Pacific Kansas City Railway.

=== Acquisition by Berkshire Hathaway ===
The Burlington Northern Santa Fe Corporation was incorporated in 1993 to facilitate the merger of Burlington Northern, Incorporated, parent of the Burlington Northern Railroad, and Santa Fe Pacific Corporation, which owned the Atchison, Topeka and Santa Fe Railway (Santa Fe). The corporate merger was consummated on September 22, 1995, at which point shareholders of the previous companies became shareholders of BNSF and the two companies became wholly owned subsidiaries of BNSF. In December 1996, the two holding companies and two railroads were formally merged, and in January 1998 the remaining intermediate holding company was folded into the railroad.

Robert Krebs of Santa Fe Pacific was president of BNSF from the merger until 1999, chief executive from the merger until 2000, and chairman from 1997 until 2002. He was succeeded in all three positions by Matthew K. Rose.

On November 3, 2009, Berkshire Hathaway made a $26 billion offer to buy the remaining 77.4% of Burlington Northern Santa Fe Corporation it did not already own, valuing the purchase at $34 billion. The deal, including Berkshire's previous investment and the assumption of $10 billion in Burlington Northern debt, brings the total value to $44 billion. Consummated February 12, 2010, it is the largest acquisition in Berkshire Hathaway's history.

The deal was structured so that the Burlington Northern Santa Fe Corporation would merge with and into R Acquisition Company, LLC, an indirect, wholly owned subsidiary of Berkshire Hathaway. The deal closed on February 12, 2010, and at the same time, the now merged company changed its name to Burlington Northern Santa Fe, LLC. It remains an indirect, wholly owned subsidiary of Berkshire Hathaway.

=== Acquisition of Montana Rail Link ===
In January 2022, BNSF agreed to purchase Montana Rail Link, a private company, for $2 billion, through an "early lease termination". The return to BNSF control required the approval of the Surface Transportation Board, which was approved on March 8, 2023. The railroad had over 900 miles (1,400 km) of track, and served 100 stations. The main classification yard was in Laurel, Montana, with smaller yards in Missoula, Billings, Bozeman and Helena.

BNSF took over MRL operations on January 1, 2024. This absorbed the MRL into BNSF, integrating MRL operations, technology and personnel. All 1,200 employees were offered employment with BNSF.

=== Proposed merger with CSX Transportation ===
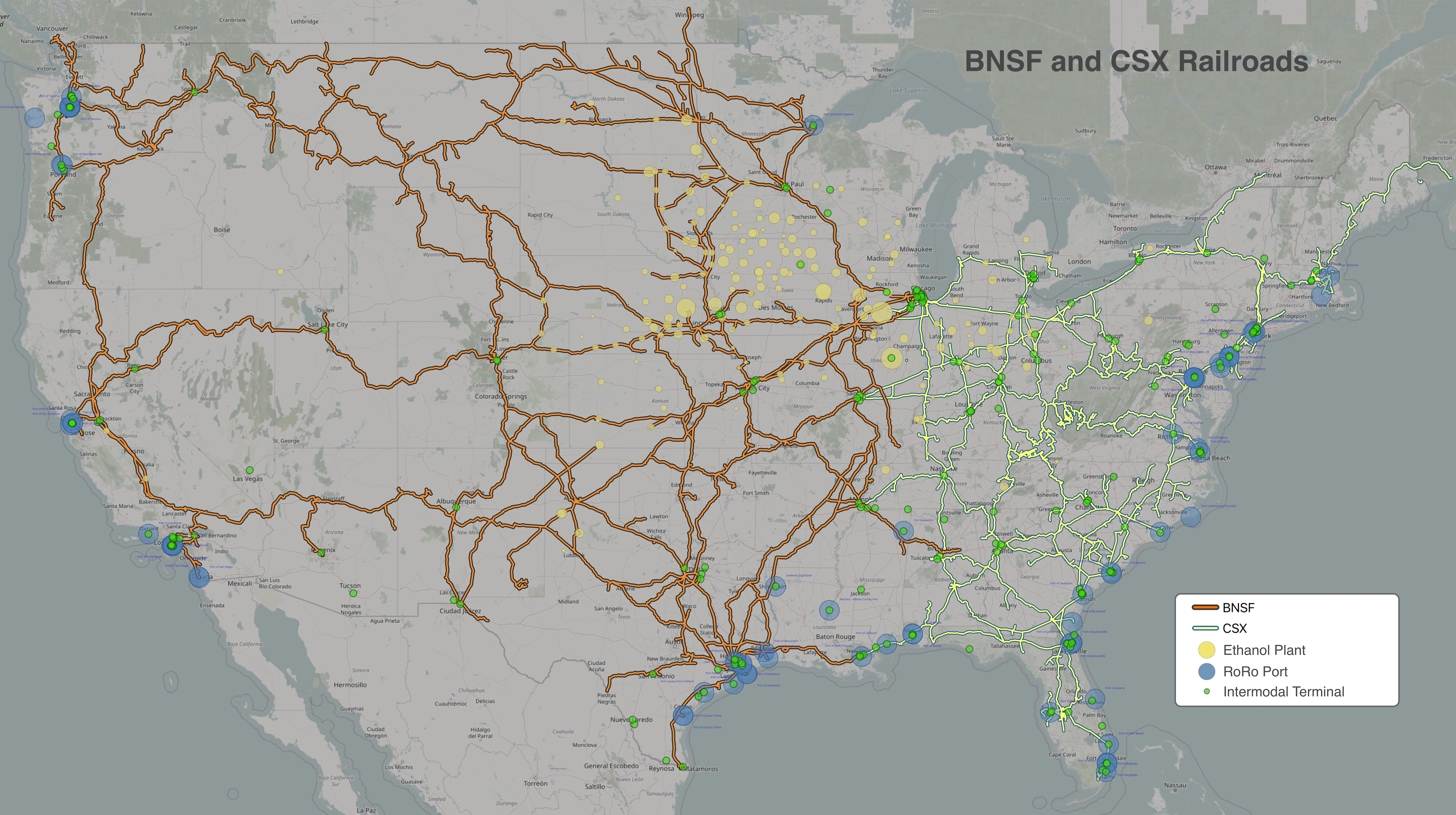
BNSF and CSX railroads

In August 2025, investor group Ancora Holdings, which recently became CSX's majority shareholder, urged the company to begin exploring a merger agreement with BNSF, the largest class I railroad in the West, in response to the announced proposed mega-merger project between Union Pacific and Norfolk Southern.

Warren Buffett, CEO and president of Berkshire Hathaway, BNSF's parent company, has denied that his railroad is seeking a merger with CSX or to submit a better offer for NS. Company executives also denied rumors of an eventual merger with one of the Eastern Class I rail companies. But the company reported that discussions are underway with CSX to launch new joint intermodal services from Jacksonville, Charlotte, Atlanta, and the ports of New York and Newark to BNSF's intermodal terminals in Phoenix, Kansas City, Barstow, Stockton, and San Bernardino.

== Operations ==
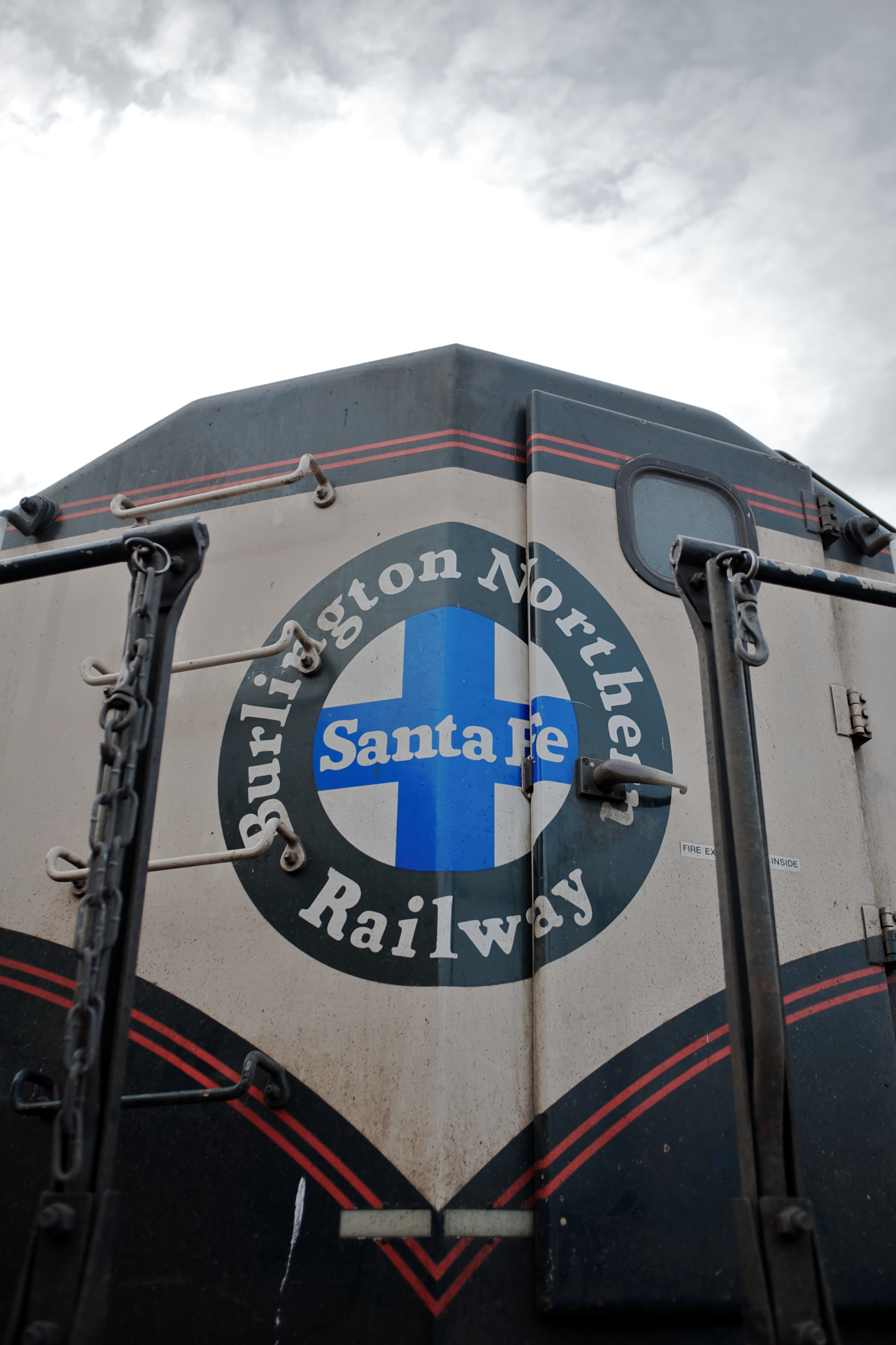
The BNSF 'heritage' logo found on an EMD SD70MAC. The colors of the logo represented the railroads that are part of BNSF.

=== Markets and services ===
With BNSF's large system, it hauls many different commodities, most notably coal and grain, as well as intermodal freight.

Predecessor Burlington Northern Railroad (BN) entered Wyoming's low-sulfur coal-rich Powder River Basin in the 1970s through construction of the Powder River Basin Joint Line with Union Pacific Railroad predecessor Chicago and North Western Transportation Company. Coal goes north in unit trains on the three-to-four-track Joint Line to Gillette or south to Orin, where older BN lines and other railroads take it in all directions to coal-burning power plants.

BNSF serves over 1,500 grain elevators, mostly in the Midwest on former BN lines. Depending on where the markets are, this grain may move in any direction in unit trains or wait in silos for demand to rise. Most commonly, grain moves west on the Northern Transcon to the Pacific Northwest and its export terminals or south to ports in Texas and the Gulf of Mexico.

The Atchison, Topeka and Santa Fe Railway's main contribution to BNSF was the Southern Transcon, a fast intermodal corridor connecting Southern California and Chicago. Most traffic is either trailers of trucking companies such as intermodal partner J. B. Hunt, or containers from the Ports of Long Beach and Los Angeles. The latter begins its trip on the triple-track Alameda Corridor, shared with the Union Pacific Railroad, and then follows BNSF rails from downtown Los Angeles. Its route, the Southern Transcon, has been almost completely double-tracked, and triple-tracking has begun in areas such as Cajon Pass.

BNSF transports Boeing 737 fuselages from the Wichita, Kansas plant to Renton, Washington.

=== Finances ===
BNSF Railway Company
- Founded: December 31, 1996, as Burlington Northern and Santa Fe Railway
- Key people: Kathryn Farmer (president and CEO)
- Revenue: ▲US$25.888 billion (2022)
- Operating income: ▲US8.6 billion (2022)
- Net income: ▲US$5.496 billion (2022)
- Total assets: ▲US$92.611 billion (2022)
- Total equity: ▲US$47.236 billion (2022)
- Number of employees: ▼36,250 (Dec 2022)
- Parent: Berkshire Hathaway

=== Trackage ===
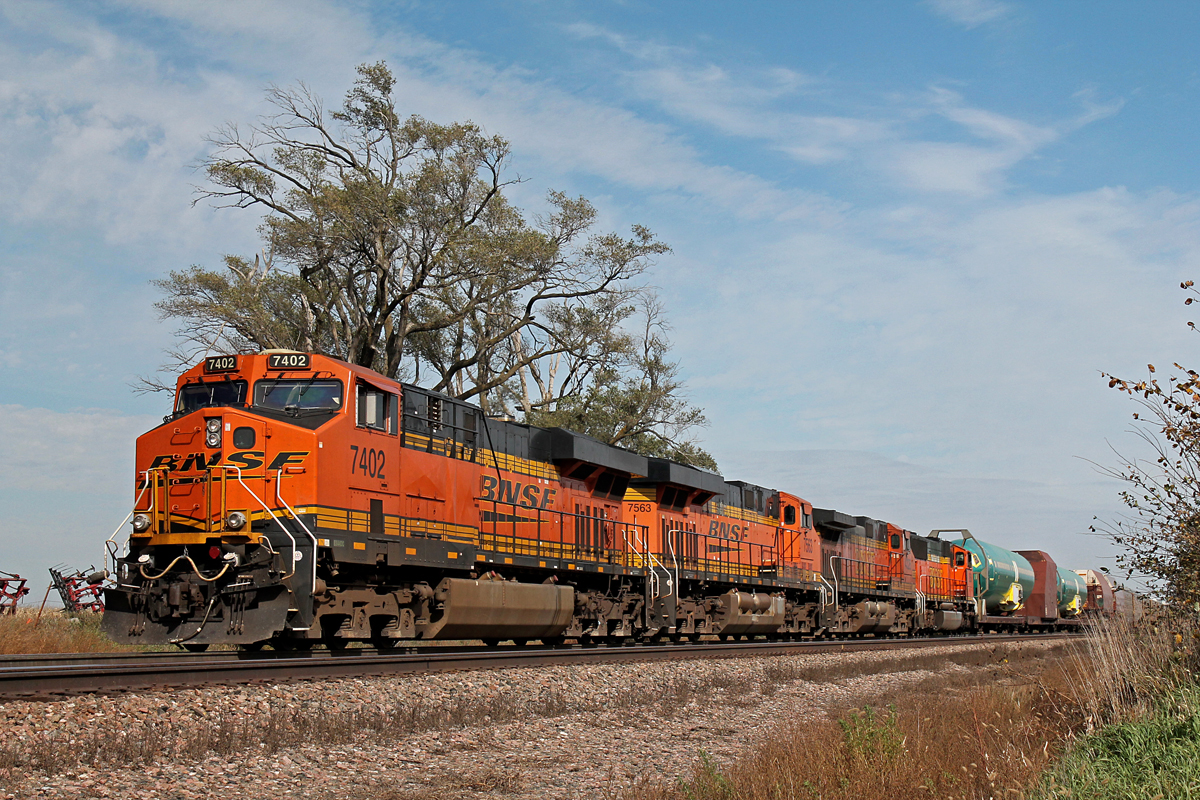
BNSF ES44DC 7402 leads a train of Boeing 737 fuselages at Greenwood, Nebraska, in October 2014

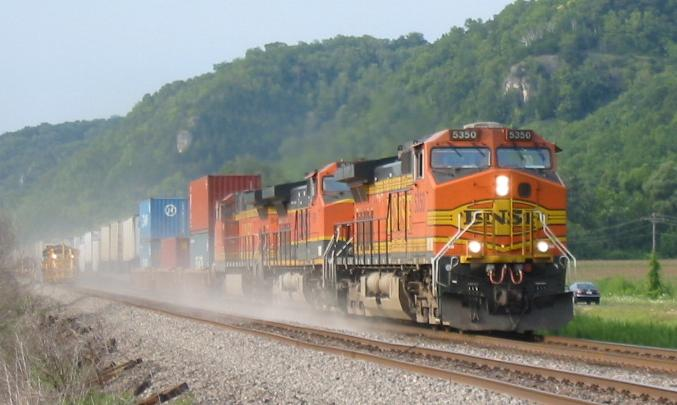
An eastbound BNSF Railway train passes some maintenance of way equipment in Prairie du Chien, Wisconsin, August 8, 2004. The lead unit is painted in the Heritage II scheme.

BNSF Railway directly owns and operates track in 28 U.S. states: Alabama, Arizona, Arkansas, California, Colorado, Idaho, Illinois, Iowa, Kansas, Louisiana, Minnesota, Mississippi, Missouri, Montana, Nebraska, Nevada, New Mexico, North Dakota, Oklahoma, Oregon, South Dakota, Tennessee, Texas, Utah, Washington, Wisconsin, and Wyoming. The railway also operates a small amount of track in Canada, including an approximate 30-mile (48 km) section that runs from the U.S.–Canada border to Vancouver, British Columbia, some tracks and a yard in Winnipeg, Manitoba, approximately 70 miles (110 km) of joint track with the Canadian National Railway, which runs south to the U.S. border at Emerson, Manitoba, and less than a kilometer of trackage at the border in Northgate, Saskatchewan.

For administrative purposes, BNSF is divided into two regions and ten operating divisions. The North Region includes the Montana, Northwest, Twin Cities, Heartland and Powder River divisions. The South Region includes the Red River, California, Chicago, Kansas and Southwest divisions. Each division is further divided into subdivisions, which represent segments of track ranging from 300-mile (480 km) mainlines to 10-mile (16 km) branch-lines. The former Texas and Gulf divisions were combined into the Red River Division, and the former Springfield and Nebraska divisions were combined into the Heartland Division, in the spring of 2016.

Not including second, third and fourth main-line trackage, yard trackage, and siding trackage, BNSF directly owns and operates over 24,000 miles (39,000 km) of track. When these additional tracks are counted, the length of track which the railway directly controls rises to more than 50,000 miles (80,000 km).

Additionally, BNSF Railway has gained trackage rights on more than 8,000 miles (13,000 km) of track throughout the United States and Canada. These rights allow the BNSF to operate its own trains with its own crews on competing railroads' main tracks. BNSF locomotives also occasionally show up on competitors' tracks throughout the United States and Canada by way of leases, mileage equalizations, and other contractual arrangements.

=== Yards and facilities ===
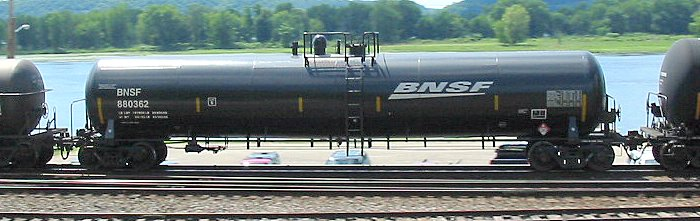
BNSF 880362, a DOT-111 tank car passing Glen Haven, Wisconsin, shows the new corporate logo on June 3, 2006

BNSF operates various facilities all over the United States, plus a yard in Winnipeg, to support its transportation system. Facilities operated by the railway include yards and terminals throughout its rail network, system locomotive shops to perform locomotive service and maintenance, a centralized operations center for train dispatching and network operations monitoring in Fort Worth, and regional dispatching centers.

BNSF Railway also operates numerous transfer facilities throughout the western United States to facilitate the transfer of intermodal containers, trailers, and other freight traffic. BNSF Railway has direct control over a total of 33 intermodal hubs and 23 automotive distribution facilities.

The BNSF mechanical division operates 13 locomotive maintenance facilities that perform preventive maintenance, repairs and servicing of equipment. The largest of these are in Alliance, Nebraska, and Argentine Yard in Kansas City, Kansas. The mechanical division also controls 46 additional facilities responsible for car maintenance and daily running repairs.

The BNSF system mechanical division, a subset of the mechanical division, operates two maintenance-of-way work equipment shops, responsible for performing repairs and preventive maintenance to BNSF's track and equipment, in Brainerd, Minnesota, and Galesburg, Illinois. The system mechanical division also operates Western Fruit Express's refrigerated car repair shop in Spokane, Washington.

On October 1, 2022, BNSF Railway announced plans to construct a $1.5 billion state of the art master planned rail facility in Southern California, the first such facility developed by a Class I railroad. The Barstow International Gateway, encompassing approximately 4,500 acres (1,800 ha, 7.0 sq mi), an integrated rail facility, will be on the west side of Barstow, California. This facility will enable more efficient rail operations from the Port of Los Angeles and Port of Long Beach to trains for transport through the Alameda Corridor onto the BNSF mainline to the new facility, and then move across the nation on the eastbound BNSF route network.

In June 2024, BNSF Railway announced plans to develop the Surprise Intermodal/Logistics Center, a regional rail-served facility near Phoenix, Arizona. The planned site is in northwest Maricopa County and covers 4,321 acres (1,749 ha) of land. The facility consists of three distinct, interrelated components:

- An intermodal facility on 1,770 acres (716 ha), which will provide a transfer hub for rail shipments by containers and trailers.
- A logistics park on 1,420 acres (575 ha), which will provide sites for warehouse and distribution facilities.
- A logistics center on 1,131 acres (458 ha), providing direct-rail-serviced sites for local industry.

==== Hump yards ====
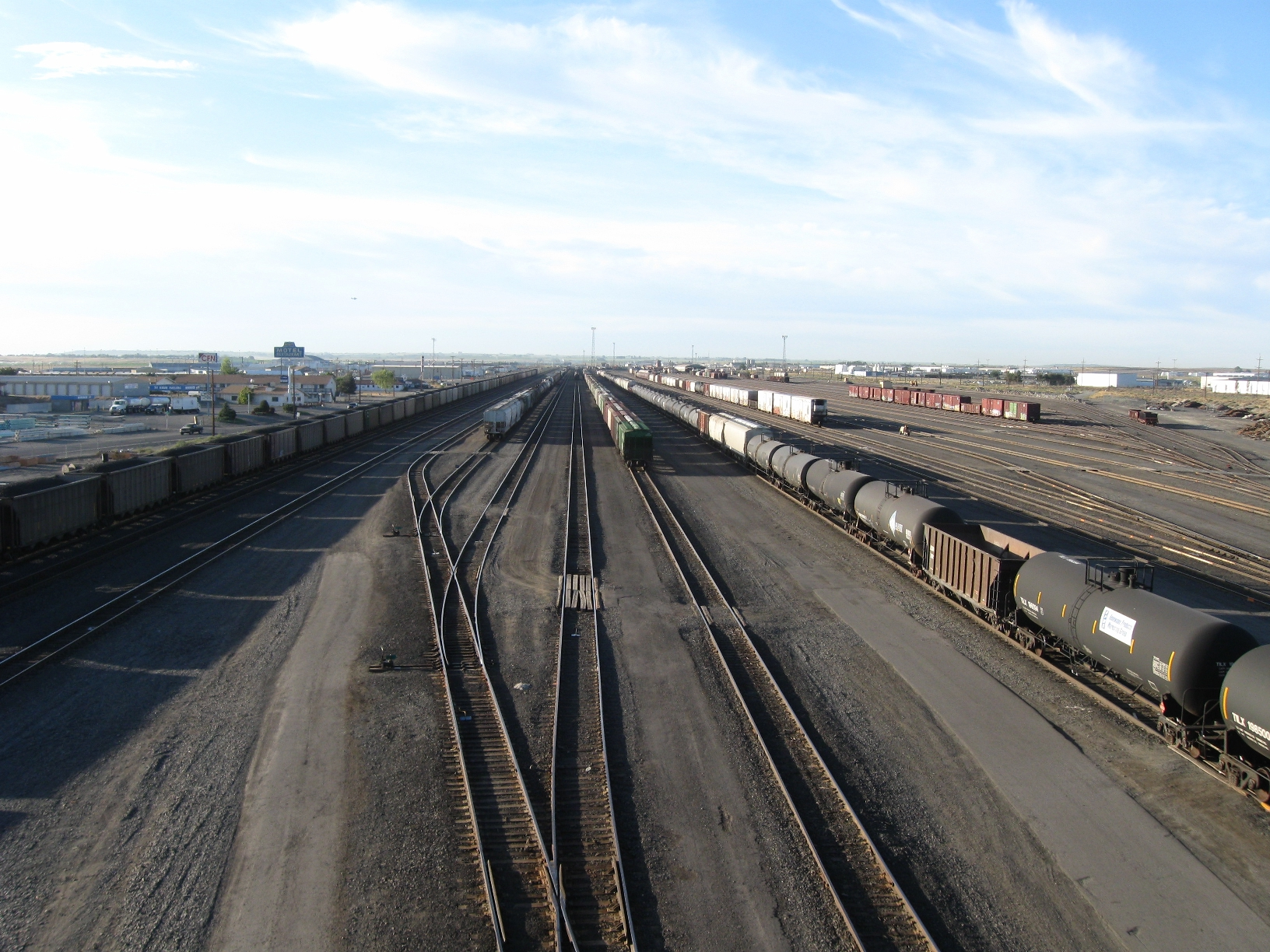
Pasco Yard

Large freight car hump yards are located throughout the BNSF system.

- Barstow, California – Barstow Yard
- Galesburg, Illinois – Galesburg Yard
- Kansas City, Kansas – Argentine Yard
- Lincoln, Nebraska – Hobson Yard
- Memphis, Tennessee – Tennessee Yard
- Minneapolis, Minnesota – Northtown Yard
- Pasco, Washington – Pasco Yard
- Tulsa, Oklahoma – Cherokee Yard

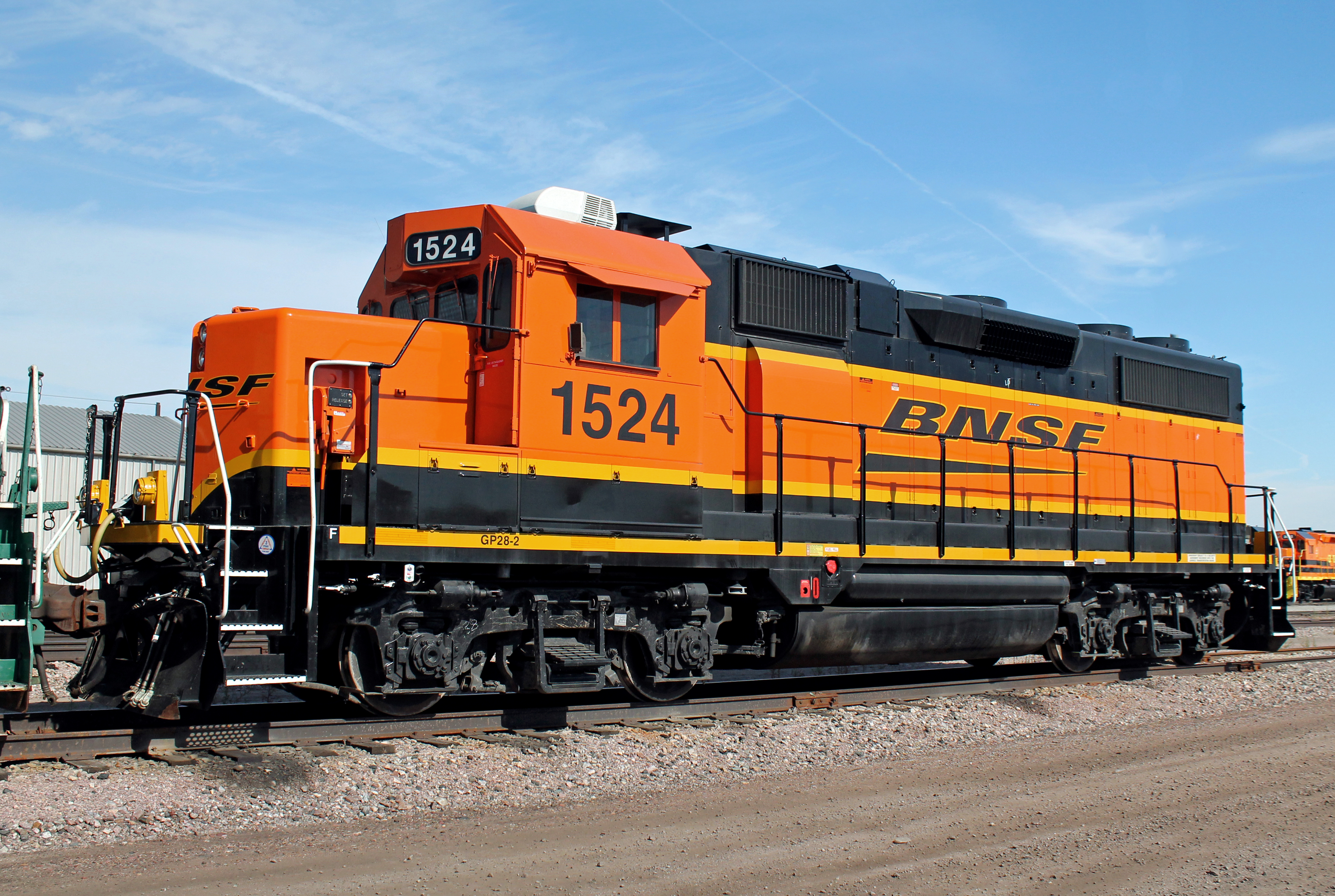
A second-generation Electro-Motive Diesel (EMD) yard-switching engine at Hobson Yard in Lincoln, Nebraska. This is EMD GP28-2 (GP28M) low emissions BNSF H4 1524.

==== Intermodal yards ====
Location of some intermodal yards:

- Cicero, Illinois – Chicago Cicero
- Chicago, Illinois – Corwith Intermodal Facility
- Commerce, California
- Edgerton, Kansas – Logistics Park Kansas City
- Elwood, Illinois – Logistics Park Chicago
- Hodgkins, Illinois – Willow Springs Intermodal Facility
- Haslet, Texas – Alliance Yard
- Los Angeles, California – Hobart Yard
- Memphis, Tennessee
- Oakland, California – Oakland International Gateway
- Omaha, Nebraska - Gibson Yard
- Seattle, Washington – Seattle International Gateway (SIG) Intermodal Facility

=== Routes ===
- The Northern Transcon runs between Seattle and Chicago. The route is a combination of parts of the old Great Northern, the Northern Pacific, and the Spokane, Portland and Seattle Railway.
- The Southern Transcon runs between Los Angeles and Chicago. The 2006 BNSF Annual Report states: "We also added about 33 miles (53 km) of second main track on our main line between Chicago and Los Angeles. All but 51 miles (82 km) of this high-volume 2,200-mile (3,500 km) route were double track, as of the end of 2006. Last year, we ran 100 trains per day on this expanded main line, compared with 60 per day in 2000." Technically, it is not double tracked in mid-Kansas where two routes are used: Mulvane to Wichita to Newton to Emporia for primarily eastbound traffic; Emporia to El Dorado to Augusta to Mulvane for primarily westbound traffic. In 2008, BNSF completed nearly sixteen miles (26 km) of a third main track through Cajon Pass in Southern California, increasing capacity on the transcontinental main route between Chicago and Los Angeles from 100 to 150 trains per day. BNSF started adding a second main track in Abo Canyon (east of Belen, New Mexico) the largest bottleneck on the Transcon with grading in 2008–2009, bridges in 2010 and signal work in late 2010 or early 2011. Approximately 1.7 million cubic yards (1.3 million cubic metres) of rock need to be excavated, mostly by blasting. The 2008 BNSF Annual Report states: "Following completion of the Abo Canyon project scheduled in 2011, our 2,200 miles (3,500 km) Transcontinental Corridor between Southern California and Chicago will have only about 30 miles (48 km) of single track."
- The Powder River Basin supplies forty percent of the coal in the United States. The 2008 BNSF Annual Report states that the quadruple track project was completed.

=== Operating divisions ===
The BNSF system is divided into 13 divisions grouped into three regions. Each division includes numerous subdivisions, normally comprising a single main line and branches. A fourteenth division, Colorado, has been consolidated with the Powder River Division, except for the Casper and Cody Subdivisions, which were transferred to the Montana Division.

Region	Division	States and provinces	Headquarters	Subdivisions	Notes
South	California	California, Nevada, Utah	San Bernardino, CA	Bakersfield, Cajon, Lucerne Valley, Mojave, Needles, San Bernardino, San Diego, Stockton	
South	Chicago	Illinois, Iowa, Minnesota, Missouri, Wisconsin	Chicago, IL	Aurora, Barstow, Brookfield, Chicago, Chillicothe, Marceline, Mendota, Ottumwa, Peoria, St. Croix, Thomas Hill	
Central	Gulf (Now the Red River Division)	Arkansas, Louisiana, Texas	Spring, TX	Bay City, Conroe, Galveston, Houston, Lafayette, Lampasas, Longview, Mykawa, Silsbee	
South	Kansas	Colorado, Kansas, Missouri, Nebraska, New Mexico, Oklahoma, Texas	Kansas City, KS	Arkansas City, Douglass, Emporia, Hereford, La Junta, Panhandle, Plainview, Slaton, Strong City, Topeka, Fort Scott	
South	Los Angeles	California	Los Angeles, CA	Alameda Corridor, Harbor, San Bernardino	
North	Montana	Montana, North Dakota, Wyoming	Billings, MT	Big Sandy, Broadview, Casper, Choteau, Circle, Cody, Colstrip, Crosby, Dickinson, Fairfield, Forsyth, Ft. Benton, Glasgow, Great Falls, Grenora, Helena, Hettinger, Hi Line, Kootenai River, Laurel, Lewistown, Milk River, Mobridge, MRL, Niobe, Sarpy Line, Sweet Grass, Valier	
Central	Nebraska (Now Heartland Division)	Illinois, Iowa, Kansas, Missouri, Nebraska	Lincoln, NE	Bayard, Beatrice, Bellwood, Council Bluffs, Creston, Des Moines, Giltner, Hastings, Lester, Napier, Neb City, Omaha, Ottumwa, Ravenna, Sioux City, St. Joseph, Wymore	
North	Northwest	British Columbia, California, Idaho, Montana, Oregon, Washington	Seattle, WA	Bellingham, Burbank, Cherry Point, Coeur d'Alene, Columbia River, Fallbridge, Gateway, Kettle Falls, Lakeside, Newport, New Westminster, Oregon Trunk, Scenic, Seattle, Spokane, Stampede, Sumas, Yakima Valley	
Central	Powder River	Colorado, Nebraska, New Mexico, Oklahoma, South Dakota, Texas, Utah, Wyoming	Gillette, WY	Akron, Angora, Big Horn, Black Hills, Boise City, Brush, Butte, Campbell, Canyon, Dalhart, Dutch, Front Range, Golden, Orin, Pikes Peak, Pueblo, Reno, Sand Hills, Spanish Peaks, Twin Peaks, Valley	
South	Southwest	Arizona, California, Colorado, New Mexico, Texas	Belen, NM	Clovis, Coronado, Defiance, El Paso, Ennis, Gallup, Glorieta, Lee Ranch, Phoenix, Raton, Seligman, Springerville	
Central	Springfield (Now Heartland Division)	Alabama, Florida, Arkansas, Illinois, Iowa, Kansas, Kentucky, Mississippi, Missouri, Oklahoma, Tennessee	Springfield, MO	Afton, Amory, Avard, Beardstown, Pensacola, Birmingham, Cherokee, Cuba, Fort Scott, Hannibal, Lead Line, River, Thayer North, Thayer South, Yates City	Includes most of the former St. Louis-San Francisco Railway
Central	Texas (Now Red River Division).	Kansas, Oklahoma, Texas	Fort Worth, Texas	BBRX, Chickasha, Creek, DFW, Ft. Worth, Madill, Red River Valley, Red Rock, Sooner, Venus, Wichita Falls	
North	Twin Cities	Iowa, Manitoba, Minnesota, Nebraska, North Dakota, South Dakota, Wisconsin	Minneapolis, MN	Aberdeen, Allouez, Appleton, Brainerd, Browns Valley, Canton, Casco, Clifford Line, Corson, Devils Lake, Drayton, Glasston, Grand Forks, Hanley Falls, Hannah, Hib Tac, Hillsboro, Hinckley, Hunter, Jamestown, KO, Lakes, Madison, Marshall, Mayville, Midway, Mitchell, Monticello, Moorhead, Morris, Noyes, P Line, Prosper, Rolla, Staples, St. Paul, Warwick, Watertown, Wayzata, Westhope, Zap Line	

=== Passenger train service ===
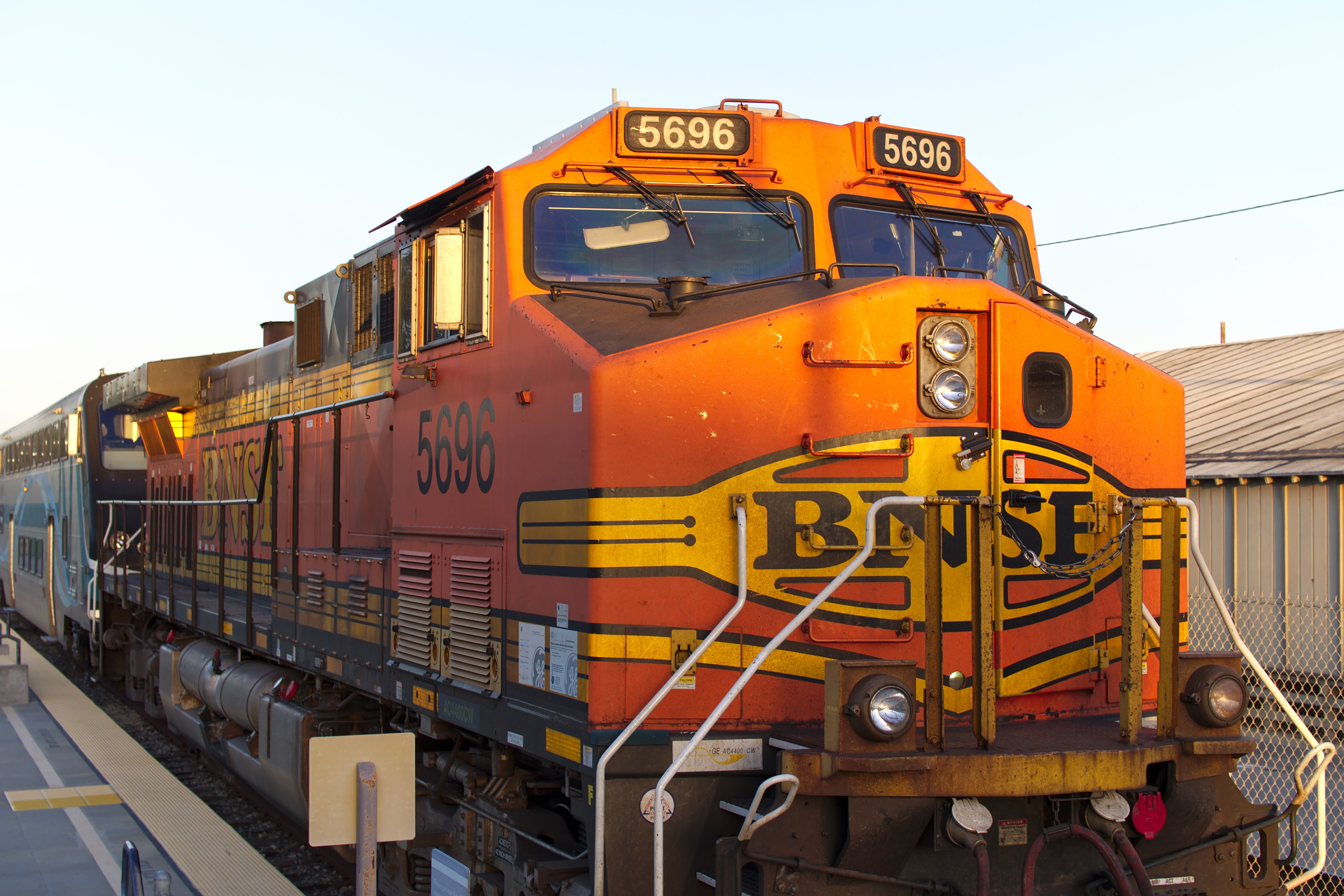
BNSF 5696 pulling a Metrolink train in the aftermath of the 2015 Oxnard train derailment

BNSF directly operates the BNSF Line for Metra in Chicago and the Sounder in the Puget Sound Region using BNSF-supplied crews in addition to running over its rails. Metra's fleet includes cars originally purchased by BNSF predecessor Chicago Burlington & Quincy with letterboards above the doors; some have the restored "BURLINGTON" lettering, while others read "BNSF Railway". Other Metra cars assigned to BNSF have the BNSF "swoosh" logo next to the door.

The company's network also hosts other commuter trains, including Metrolink in Southern California and, previously, the Northstar Line in Minneapolis. The line used by New Mexico Rail Runner Express was sold in 2005 to the state of New Mexico, but BNSF retained all freight rights on the line and operates freight trains as needed. Amtrak routes that use BNSF rails include the Amtrak Cascades, California Zephyr, Carl Sandburg, Coast Starlight, Empire Builder, Gold Runner, Heartland Flyer, Illinois Zephyr, Lincoln Service, Pacific Surfliner, Southwest Chief, Sunset Limited, and Texas Eagle.

After the 2015 Oxnard train derailment, BNSF loaned 40 of their AC4400CWs to Metrolink while their Rotem cab cars received upgrades. These 40 units were converted to PTC. The locomotives have since been returned after the cab cars went back into service.

Although it does not have a steam program like the Union Pacific, the BNSF has allowed for the Southern Pacific 4449, St. Louis–San Francisco 1522, Santa Fe 3751, Santa Fe 2926, Spokane, Portland and Seattle 700 and Milwaukee Road 261 steam locomotives to operate excursions over their rails.

=== Safety ===
BNSF has received E.H. Harriman Award for safety multiple times. But a number of accidents and incidents have occurred on the railway since its inception.

As one of the leading supporters of the Operation Lifesaver program to promote safety at railway crossings and rights-of-way, BNSF Railway established a grade-crossing closure program in 2000. This program, in which BNSF works with communities and landowners to identify unnecessary or redundant crossings, has helped close more than 2,900 of BNSF's railway crossings throughout the United States. BNSF has been the industry leader in lowering the number of grade-crossing collisions.

BNSF contracts with News Link, a small business in Lincoln, Nebraska, to publish employee newsletters focused on safety for some of the railroad's divisions and shops. These newsletters vary in length from four to 28 pages, published ranging from monthly to quarterly.

In 2014, the Occupational Safety and Health Administration ordered BNSF to pay over $526,000 to workers who had been terminated in 2010 and 2011 in contravention of provisions of the Federal Railroad Safety Act protecting whistleblowers after they revealed workplace injuries at the terminal in Havre, Montana.

In August 2016, a "huge number" of used hypodermic drug needles were found along a BNSF railroad bridge between the University Park and St. Johns neighborhoods of Portland, Oregon, that had become an encampment for the homeless. According to a conductor: "Pretty much see people down there at all hours of the night. We report them, but nobody does anything."

In March 2024, BNSF furloughed 360 mechanical workers, a small fraction of the railroad's 37,000 employees, but enough to elicit a condemning letter from the Transportation Trades Department labor coalition calling on the Federal Railroad Administrator to increase inspections. The unions maintain that these cuts will make it difficult for BNSF to finish needed repairs and inspections of its rolling stock. In a letter dated March 2024 sent to the FRA, the Shop Craft Unions at BNSF urged the Administration look at "safety and maintenance issues" in the railroad industry, presenting evidence of a 41% decrease in repair and maintenance departments since 2015. BNSF shippers complain that shipments to the northwestern U.S. have seen delays, most citing lack of enough crew as the reason. They also complained of high rates for secondary shuttle freight.

==== Safety culture assessment ====
In 2023, the FRA issued a safety culture report on BNSF. Regulators looked at ten areas of safety, including leadership, continuous learning, and how well safety is prioritized over other demands. The report said that BNSF is working toward a better safety culture but that it still needs to improve, particularly in communication and trust between management and employees.

One of the report's findings concerned the difference between what BNSF leadership says about safety and how employees experience it. Some employees felt that safety sometimes takes a back seat to getting the job done, especially with mid-level managers. The report said that safety issues are not always handled the same way across the company, and that some employees felt that safety concerns were not addressed fairly. It also noted positive steps, like BNSF's investment in safety training and efforts to promote ongoing learning.

The report gave several recommendations to help BNSF improve its safety culture, including better communication, building more trust between workers and management, and making sure safety is always the top priority. The FRA plans to monitor how BNSF responds to these recommendations.

=== Equipment ===
According to the 2007 BNSF Annual Report, at the end of 2007 the railway had more than 40,000 employees; 6,400 locomotives (8,359 as of 2018); and 85,338 freight cars (72,369 as of 2018).

- Broken down by specific kind of car, the BNSF owned:
  - 36,439 covered hoppers
  - 13,690 gondolas
  - 11,428 open hoppers
  - 10,470 flatcars
  - 7,948 boxcars
  - 4,196 refrigerated "reefer" cars
  - 427 tank cars
  - 416 automobile carriers
  - 81 private/business cars
  - 324 "other" types of cars
- In addition, the railroad also owned:
  - 3,253 domestic containers
  - 11,714 domestic chassis (Swap body) (?)
  - 4,070 company service vehicles
  - 1,200 trailers
  - 163 commuter passenger cars

At the end of 2007, the average age (from date of manufacture) was 15 years for the BNSF's locomotive fleet and 14 years for the freight car fleet.

On January 24, 2006, BNSF announced a US$2.4 billion program of infrastructure upgrades for 2006. The upgrade program includes: double- and triple-tracking 40 miles (64 km) of track and a second mainline track through New Mexico's Abo Canyon on the former ATSF transcontinental line; expanding the Lincoln, Nebraska, classification yard and double- and triple-tracking 50 miles (80 km) of track in Wyoming's Powder River Basin region; expansions at eight of the railroad's larger intermodal facilities, and extending many sidings and expanding and improving refueling facilities. In making the announcement, BNSF chairman Matthew K. Rose cited improvements in the company's return on invested capital and expressed hope for continued improvement. In March 2008, the railroad was completing the triple-tracking of Cajon Pass in California, creating four tracks through the pass—three BNSF (former Santa Fe and newly installed) and one Union Pacific (former Southern Pacific).

== Locomotive paint schemes ==
After Burlington Northern and the Atchison, Topeka and Santa Fe Railway, Topeka & Santa Fe Railway merged in 1995, BNSF Railway introduced a series of locomotive paint schemes reflecting its combined heritage. The initial post-merger design, unveiled in August 1995 on SD70MAC No. 9647, was a one-time commemorative scheme combining elements of Santa Fe's red-and-silver "Warbonnet" and BN's "Executive" green and cream livery. The unit featured "BNSF" lettering in place of "Santa Fe" on the nose and "Burlington Northern Santa Fe" along the side. Rail fans called it "Vomit Bonnet" due to its clashing colors. The locomotive was repainted with the standard Heritage III scheme in 2013.

By early 1996, BNSF began applying interim branding, patching existing BN and ATSF locomotives with "BNSF" lettering while developing a new standard livery. In May 1996, SD60M No. 9297 debuted in a scheme drawing from the pre-1967 orange and dark green colors of the Great Northern Railway. It also incorporated red and silver to symbolize other BN predecessors and Santa Fe. A new logo featuring "Burlington Northern Santa Fe Railway" within the Santa Fe cross accompanied the design. Employees selected one side's simpler striping configuration for future use, which was then adopted with minor adjustments as the railroad's new standard paint scheme, later called Heritage I. Santa Fe's Warbonnet design, modified with BNSF branding, remained in concurrent use.

Common locomotive paint schemes
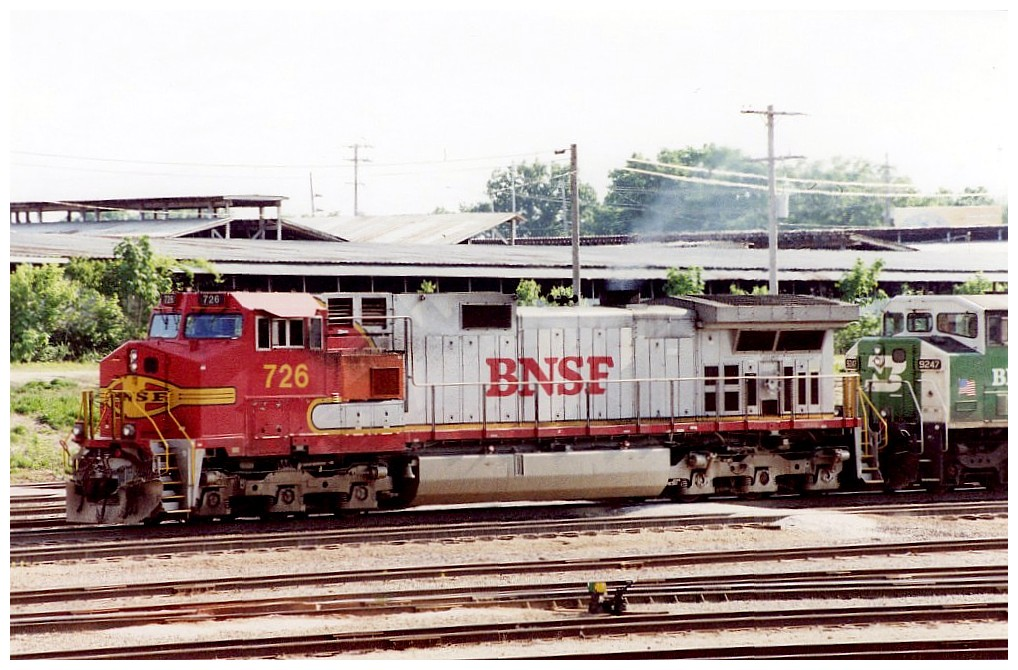
BNSF Warbonnet

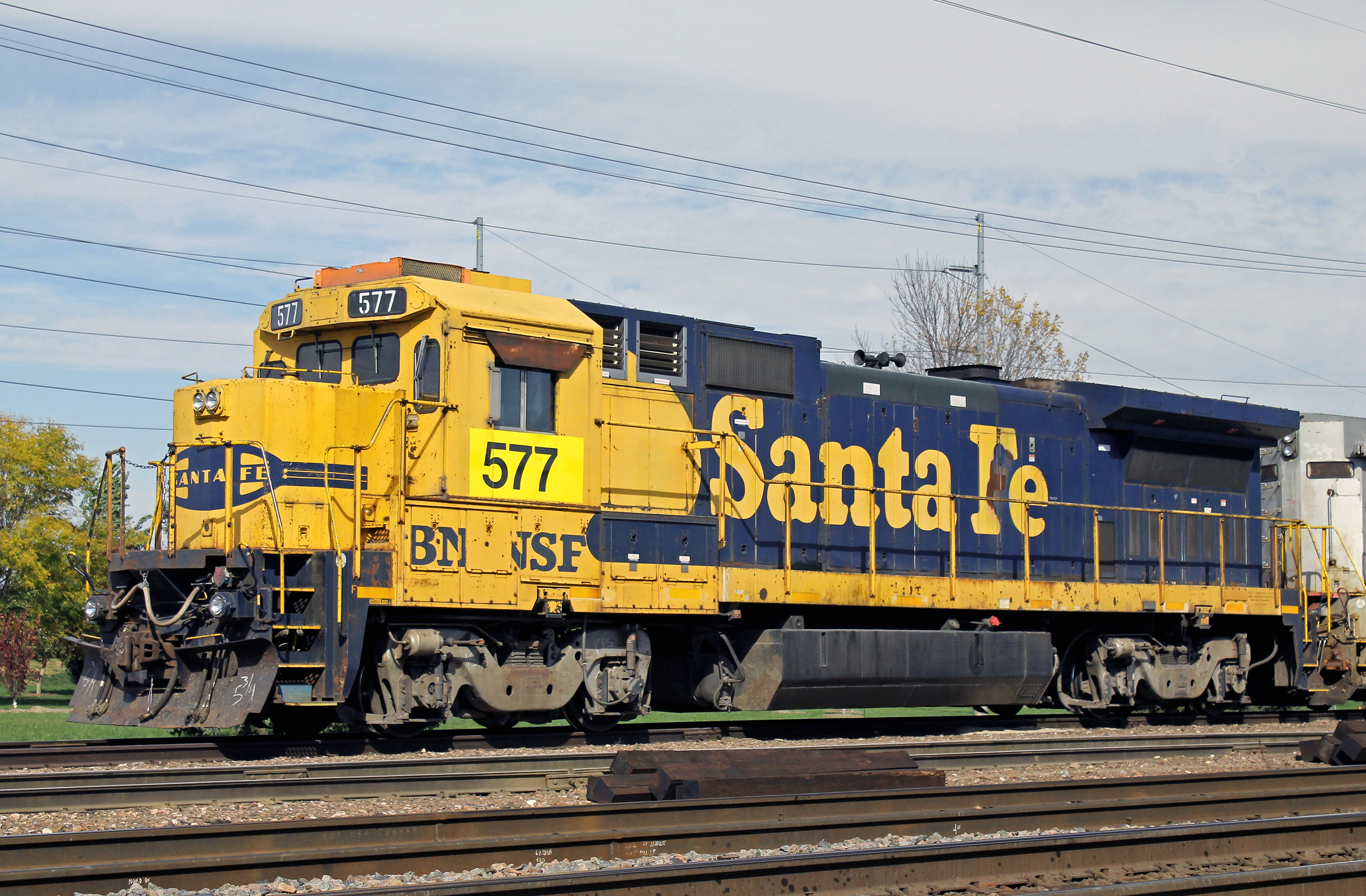
ATSF "Yellowbonnet" with Santa Fe lettering, also lettered for BNSF

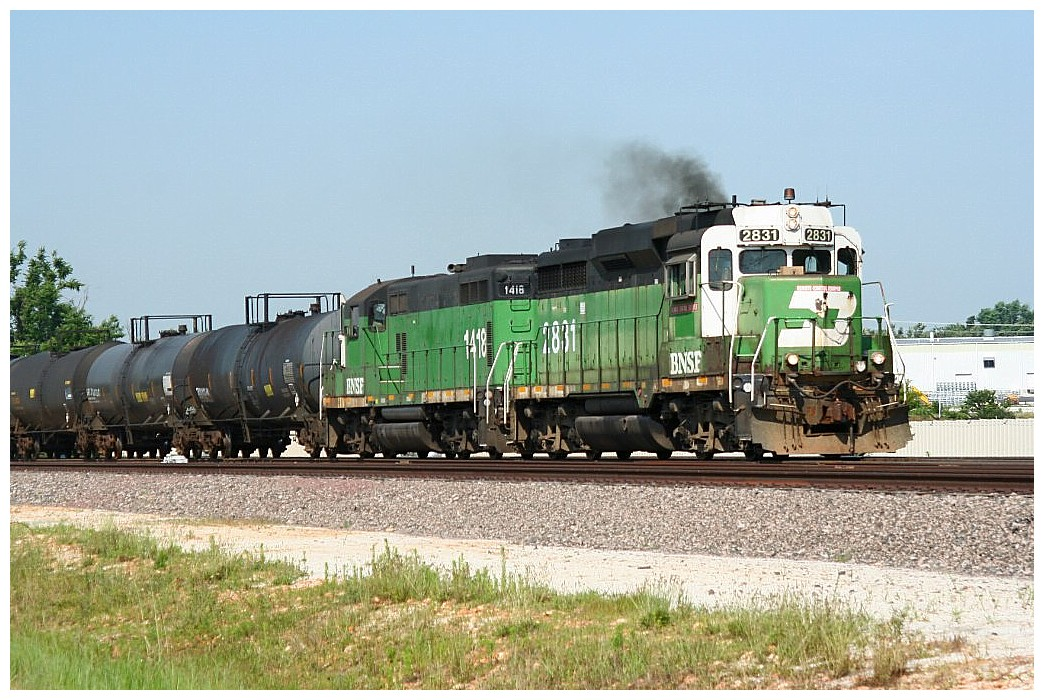
BN "Cascade Green" scheme lettered for BNSF

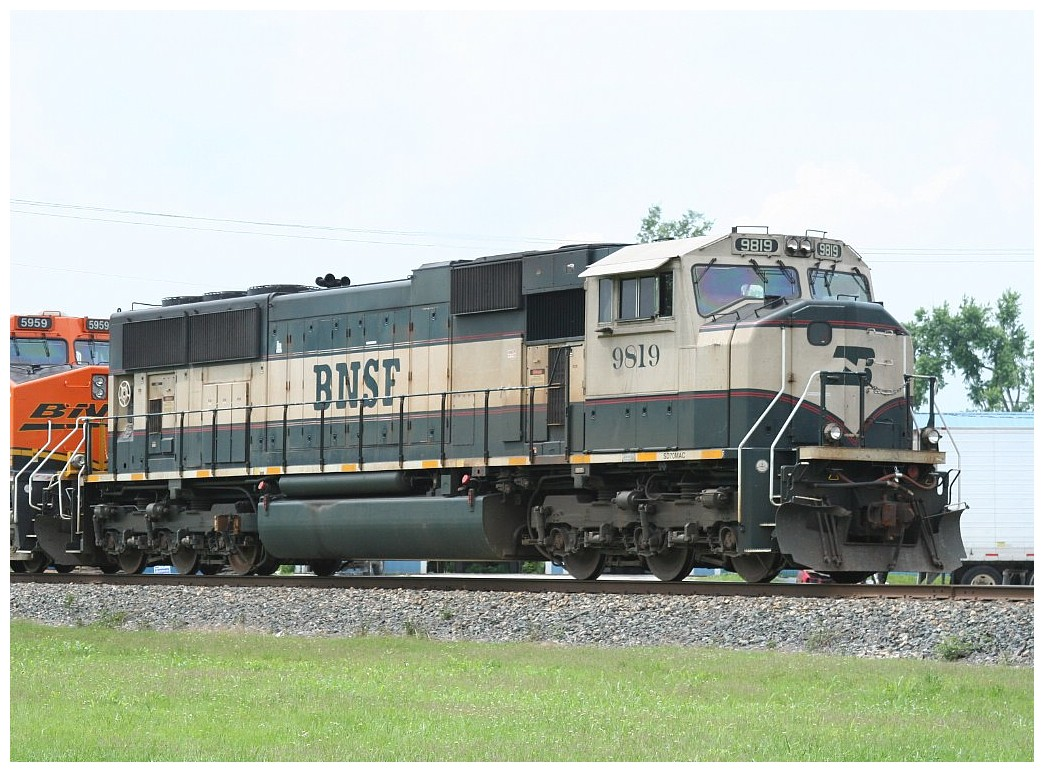
BN "Grinstein" Executive scheme lettered for BNSF

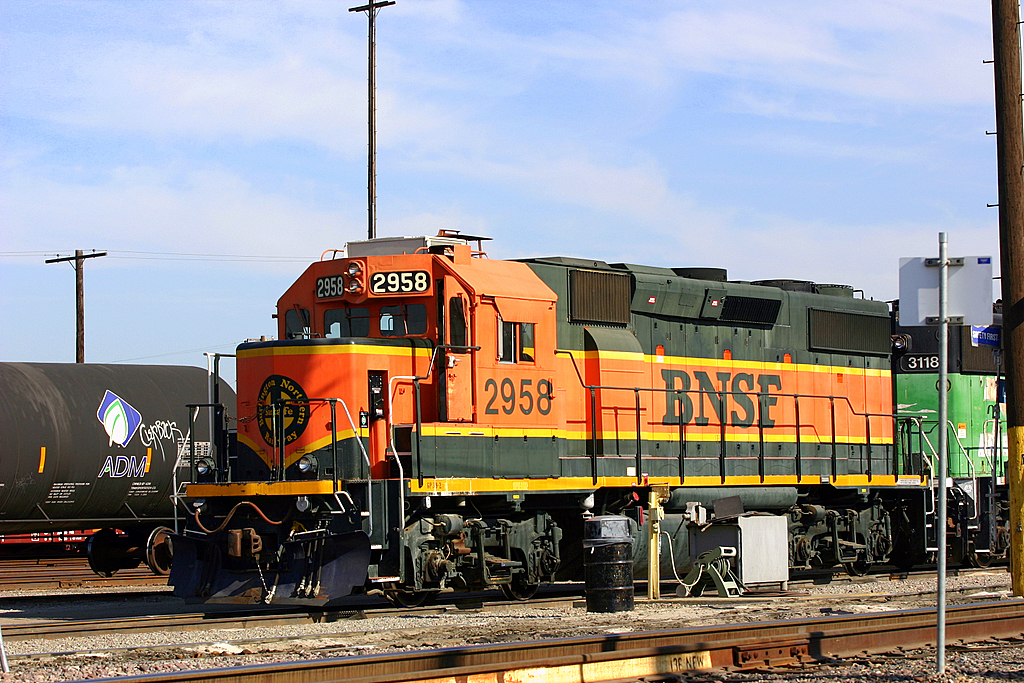
Heritage I or H1

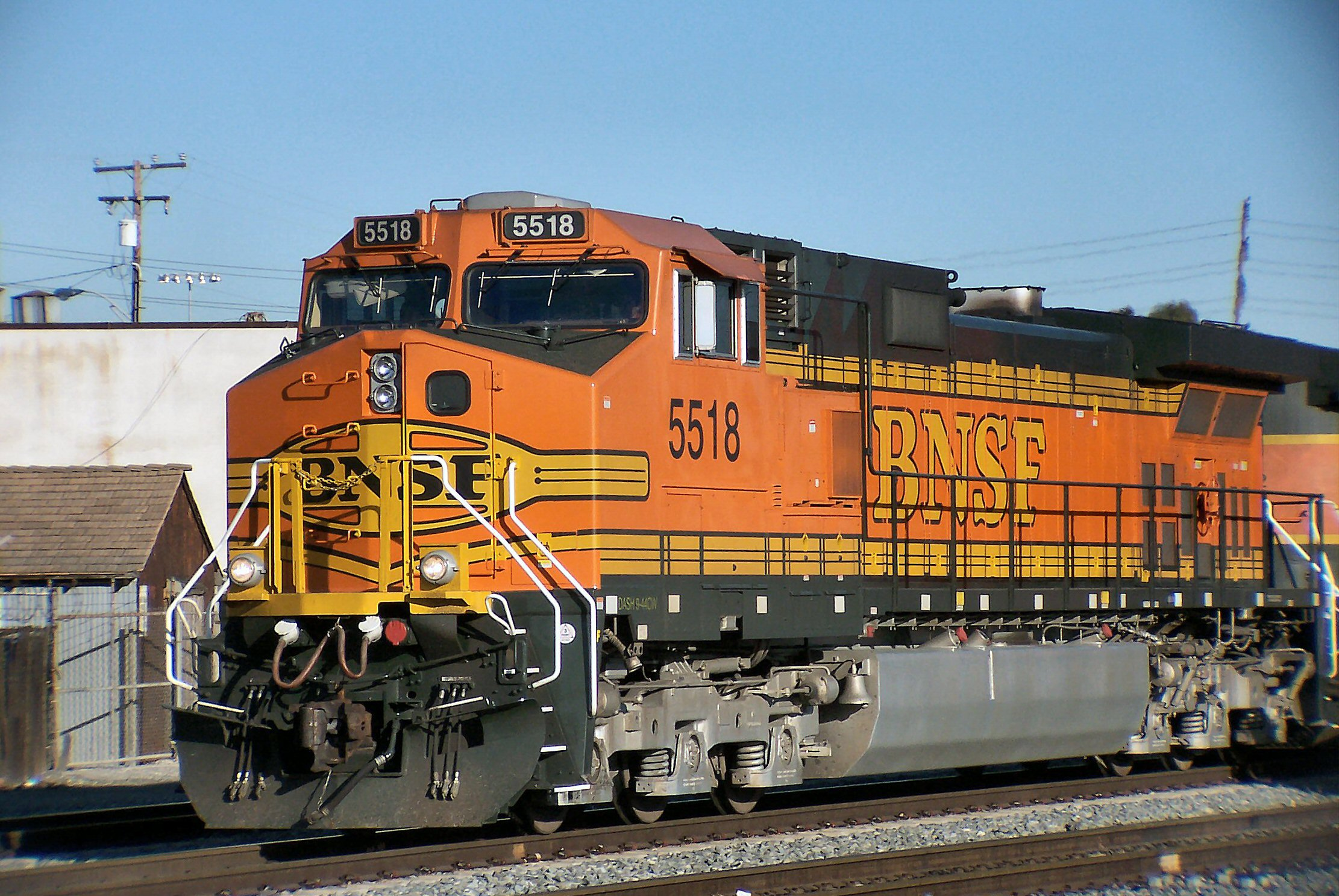
Heritage II or H2

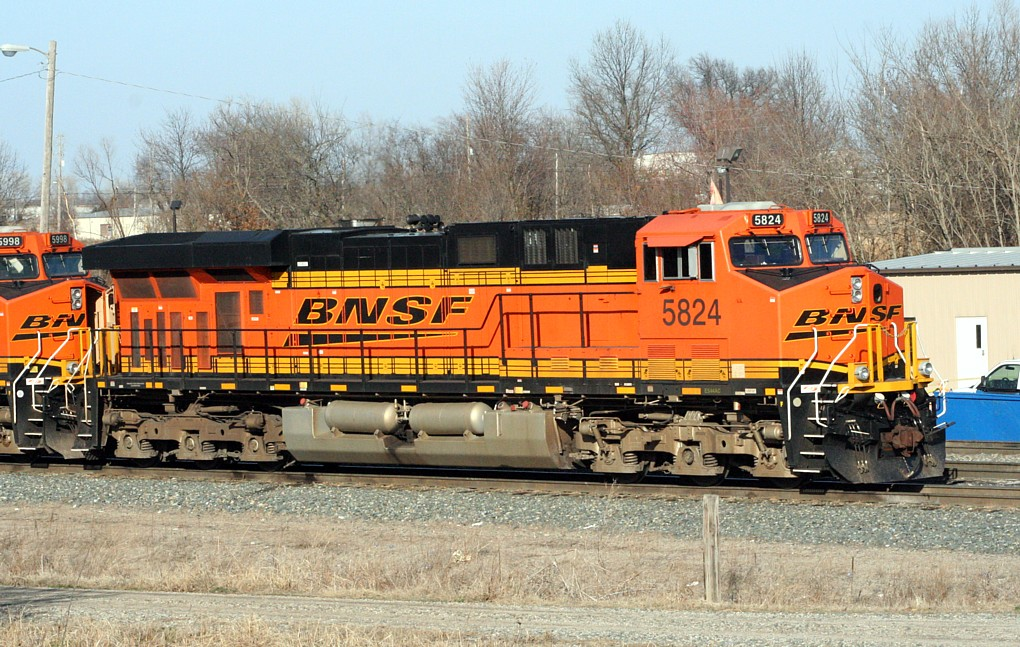
Heritage III or H3

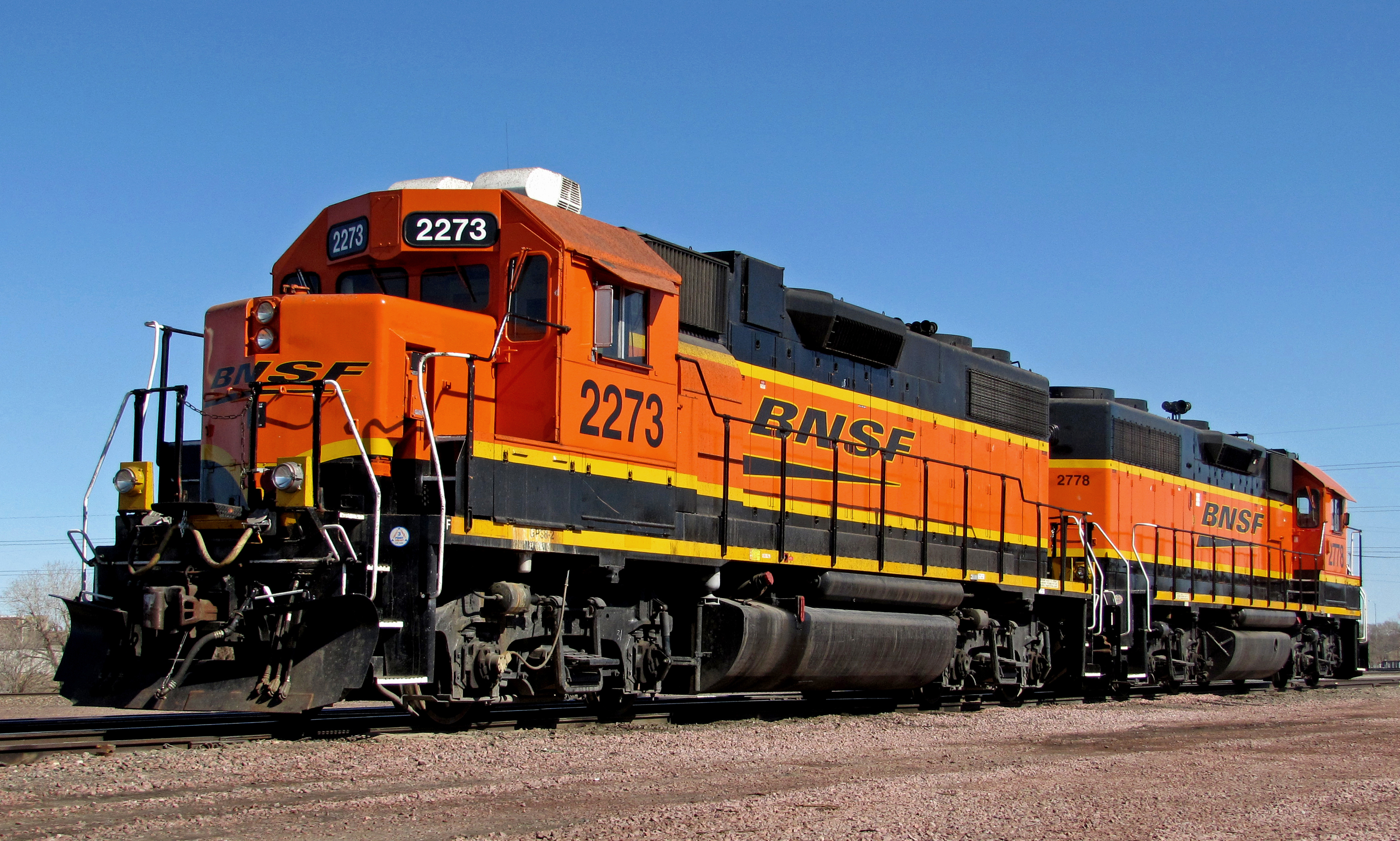
Heritage IV or H4

In January 2005, BNSF Railway adopted a new name and corporate logo to mark its tenth anniversary. This rebranding was followed by the introduction of the Heritage III livery, first applied to ES44DC No. 7701 in March 2005. Heritage III retained elements of earlier schemes but used black in place of dark green and included the updated BNSF logo.

Since 2006, locomotives designated for switching and local service have typically been painted in what is informally called the Heritage IV scheme. This version closely resembles Heritage I but incorporates black paint and the modern BNSF logo.

A number of older locomotives remain in pre-merger liveries or earlier BNSF schemes, but many of these are being retired, rebuilt, or repainted as part of the company's ongoing fleet modernization efforts.

BNSF logo adopted in 1996

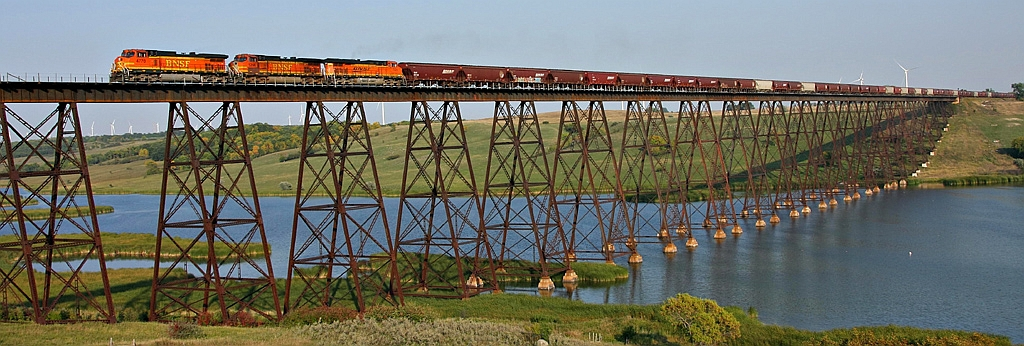
A BNSF train crosses Lake Ashtabula on the Sheyenne River west of Luverne, North Dakota. The 2,736 ft (834 m) Sheyenne River Bridge was erected in 1912 by the Great Northern Railway. The North Country Trail, a 4,600 mi (7,400 km) recreational trail, passes beneath the bridge.

== Lawsuits ==
=== Swinomish trespassing lawsuit ===
In 2015, BNSF was sued by the Swinomish Tribe in Washington state for violating the terms of a 1991 easement agreement between BNSF and the tribe that allows trains crossing the Swinomish Reservation to carry no more than 25 cars per day, with the tribe alleging that BNSF was running trains with four times as many cars as permitted under the easement agreement. In 2023, US District Court Judge Robert Lasnik ruled that BNSF "willfully, consciously and knowingly exceeded the limitations on its right of access" from September 2012 to May 2021 "in pursuit of profits," finding that BNSF made a unilateral decision to increase the number of trains and cars crossing the reservation without the tribe's consent. In June 2024, Lasnik ordered BNSF to pay $400 million to the tribe, after holding a four-day trial to determine how much in what Lasnik termed "ill-gotten" profit BNSF made by trespassing on the Swinomish Reservation from 2012 to 2021.

=== WildEarth Guardians and Western Watershed Project lawsuit ===
In 2023, two wildlife protection organizations, WildEarth Guardians and the Western Watershed Project, brought legal action against BNSF for ignoring the Endangered Species Act and not attempting to diminish the number of grizzly bears allegedly killed by trains in Montana since 2008. The groups maintain the company has been responsible for the deaths of 63 bears in that time. BNSF has applied to the United States Fish and Wildlife Service for a permit that would eliminate any penalty to the railroad for killing bears. According to the plaintiffs, the U.S. government never issued the permit and therefore the BNSF is liable.

== See also ==
- BNSF Railway Police, the law enforcement agency responsible for policing BNSF trackage and property
- Burlington Northern Santa Fe Manitoba, a subsidiary of BNSF, in Winnipeg, Manitoba
