= Carolyn Jane Rodriguez =

American teacher and politician

Carolyn Jane (Deshon) Rodriguez (January 25, 1944 – March 7, 2002) was an American teacher and politician.

Born in San Francisco, California, Rodriguez received her degree from the University of Texas and went to the University of Madrid. In 1976, Rodriguez moved to Minnesota. She served in the Minnesota House of Representatives as a Democrat from 1981 until 1984 from Apple Valley, Minnesota. She died of bone cancer in Apple Valley, Minnesota. Rodriquez was a member of the Metropolitan Council and known for her work involving transit. She authored the legislation that allowed for the creation of the suburban opt-out transit authorities such as Maple Grove Transit, Plymouth Metrolink, SouthWest Transit, and Minnesota Valley Transit Authority.
