= I-35W & 46th Street station =

Bus rapid transit station in Minneapolis on the Orange Line

I-35W & 46th St
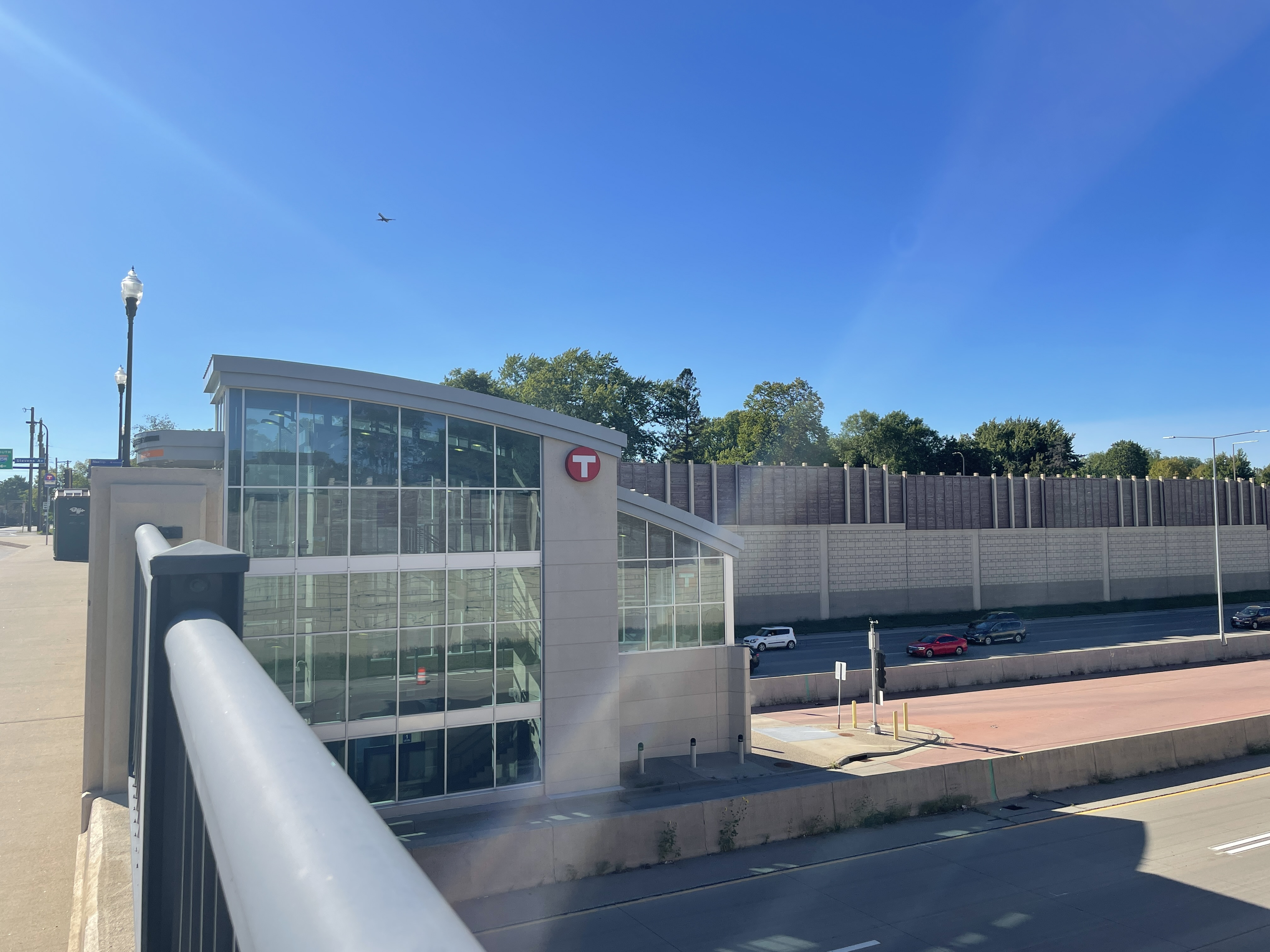
- I-35W & 46th St station as seen from the 46th St overpass

General information
- Location: 175/180 East 46th Street; Minneapolis, Minnesota
- Coordinates: 44°55′11″N 93°16′29″W
- Platforms: 1 island platform
- Connections: Metro Transit: 11, 46

Construction
- Accessible: Yes

History
- Opened: December 4, 2010

Passengers
- 2025: 171 daily
- Rank: 70 out of 129

Services
Preceding station	Metro	Following station
I-35W & Lake Street toward Marquette-2nd Avenue & 3rd Street-Washington	Orange Line	I-35W & 66th Street toward Burnsville Heart of the City
Location

I-35W & 46th Street station is a Metro Orange Line bus rapid transit station located in Minneapolis, Minnesota. In addition to the BRT service, the station is also served by Metro route 578. The station was constructed as part of the I-35W/Minnesota State Highway 62 Crosstown Commons reconstruction project and opened in 2010. Consisting of two levels, one on East 46th Street, and the other in the median of Interstate 35W, the station was the first of its kind in Minnesota. The station allows for transit routes operating on I-35W to stop for riders without leaving the region's high occupancy toll lane system. The station was designed in anticipation of full bus rapid transit service along I-35W to downtown Minneapolis, a vision that was realized in 2021 with the opening of the Metro Orange Line. The station cost $4.5 million to build.

== Background and history ==
While making plans to restructure transit service in the south metro areas in 2002, Metro Transit planners proposed constructing transit stations at locations along I-35W at Diamond Lake Road, 46th Street, and 35th/36th Streets. Stations along I-35W were not planned to accommodate park-and-ride facilities. At the time there was no crosstown service on 46th Street. The approved plan created Route 46 which travels between Edina and Saint Paul along 46th Street among other streets. A new route that was eventually replaced by the Orange Line, Route 535, was also instituted to provide all-day express transit service between Bloomington, Richfield, and downtown Minneapolis.

The Minnesota Legislature passed a bill to study BRT in the I-35W corridor from Lakeville to Minneapolis in 2003 with bipartisan support from Lakeville and Minneapolis legislators. Plans for the station were included in the Crosstown Commons reconstruction project. The Minnesota Department of Transportation was required to request municipal consent from the city of Minneapolis for project but were initially denied consent in 2004 due to the city's concern that MnDOT was not sufficiently committed to BRT on I-35W. MnDOT appealed to a board created under state law. The appeals board created a plan to create the 46th St Station and have MnDOT commit to funding transit projects. Minneapolis eventually approved municipal consent in April 2005 after it reach an agreement with MnDOT to extend BRT north from the Crosstown Commons project border to downtown. Extending BRT to downtown would involve the then unfunded I-35W Access Project. Unresolved issues included how buses would travel from the HOT lanes in the center to bus only shoulder lanes after 46th Street and into downtown. Transit stops and a potential BRT station at Lake Street were other concerns.

Plans for the 46th Street Station in 2004 were compared to the Uptown Transit Center minus the parking and turnaround space for buses which was a smaller proposal than a bus hub proposed in 2000. There was no funding identified for the 46th Street Station in 2004. By 2006 the state legislature approved $3.3 million in the bonding bill for design and construction of the station. Construction of the station was predicated on the replacement of the 46th Street bridge over I-35W and phasing of the Crosstown Commons reconstruction but was expected to open in 2010 or 2011. Federal funding was also identified when the region applied through the Urban Partnership Agreement which identified ways to reduce congestion, especially along the I-35W corridor.

== Opening ==
When the station opened in December 2010, transit service in the area was restructured to allow for transfers between I-35W buses and crosstown routes, improve travel times to suburban locations, and the introduction of full BRT service along the I-35W corridor. Thirteen routes were impacted. Transit service on crosstown Route 46 had its frequency increased from every 30 minutes to every 15 minutes. Local neighbors were concerned about people "park-and-hiding" where riders park in local streets and walk to the station. Upon opening, the portion of the station serving I-35W was open five days a week with transit service on the 46th Street portion of the station available all week. An estimated 330 people were expected to begin using the station on weekdays with up to 550 on weekdays once full BRT service was implemented with an expected opening in 2012.

Full BRT service was finally implemented in 2021 with the opening of the Metro Orange Line . Local and express transit service in the area was again restructured to coincide with the opening of the Orange Line. Two bus routes were eliminated, Routes 535 and 597, and replaced by the Orange Line. The Orange Line offers service to the station on seven days a week.

== Station ==
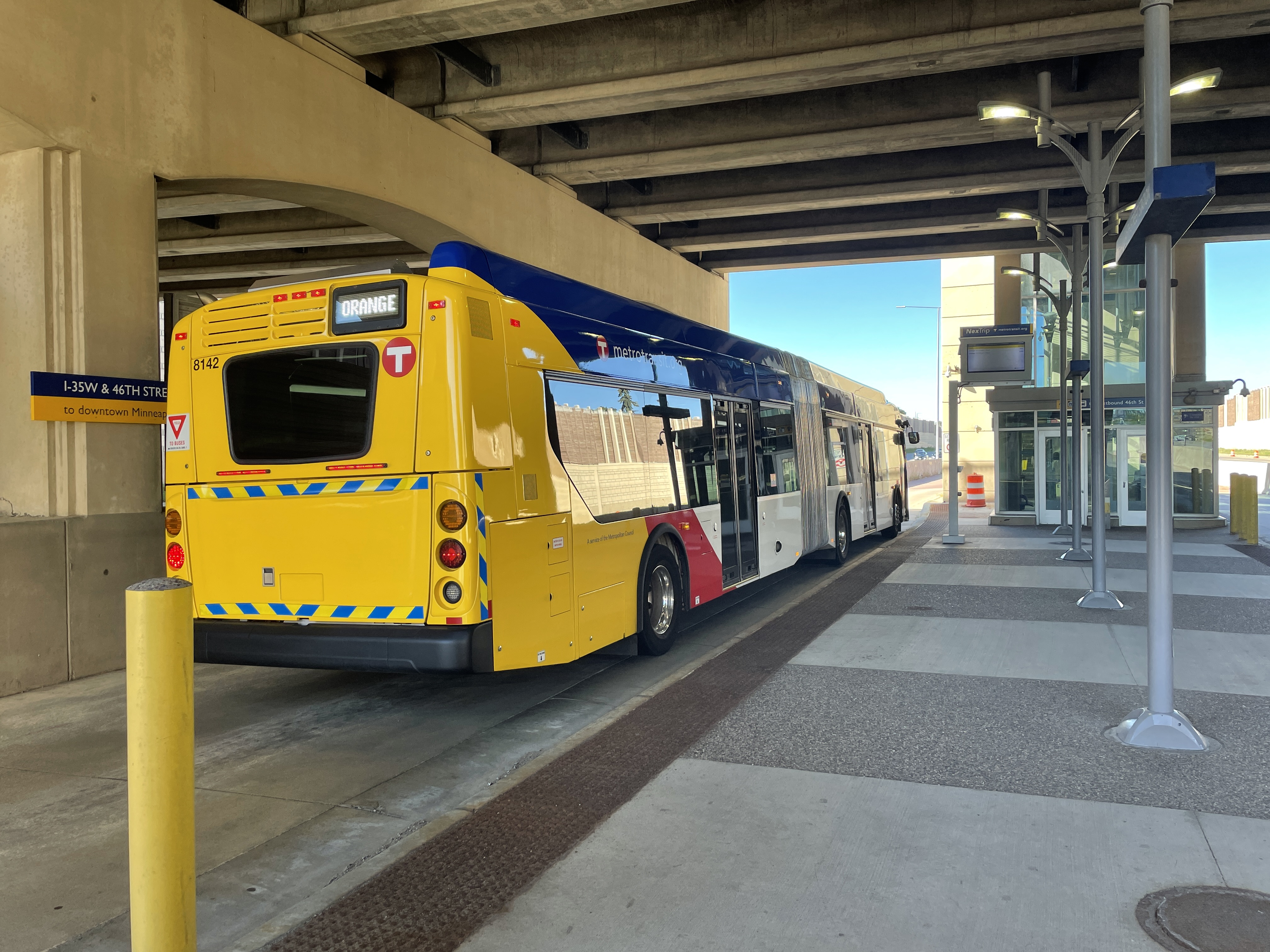
A METRO Orange Line bus boards passengers heading northbound on the freeway level of station

The station uses a single center platform for passenger pick-up and drop-off. Buses on the route use the standard right-hand traffic configuration with entrance/exit doors on the right, so the northbound and southbound busways cross over each other immediately north and south of the station so that the doors will face the platform. Bus traffic is controlled via gates and traffic signals through the cross over portion of the travel lanes so that buses do not collide with each other. Northbound riders board and disembark on the west side of the platform while southbound riders do so on the east side of the platform. The station has real-time transit information and indoor waiting areas. Geothermal heating and cooling is provided by 24 geothermal wells.

The station is compliant with the Americans with Disabilities Act and has a pair stairway and elevator towers, one on each side of the 46th Street bridge. The interior of the station can hold around 100 people and the platforms outside around 180.

== Gallery ==
I-35W & 46th Street station gallery photos
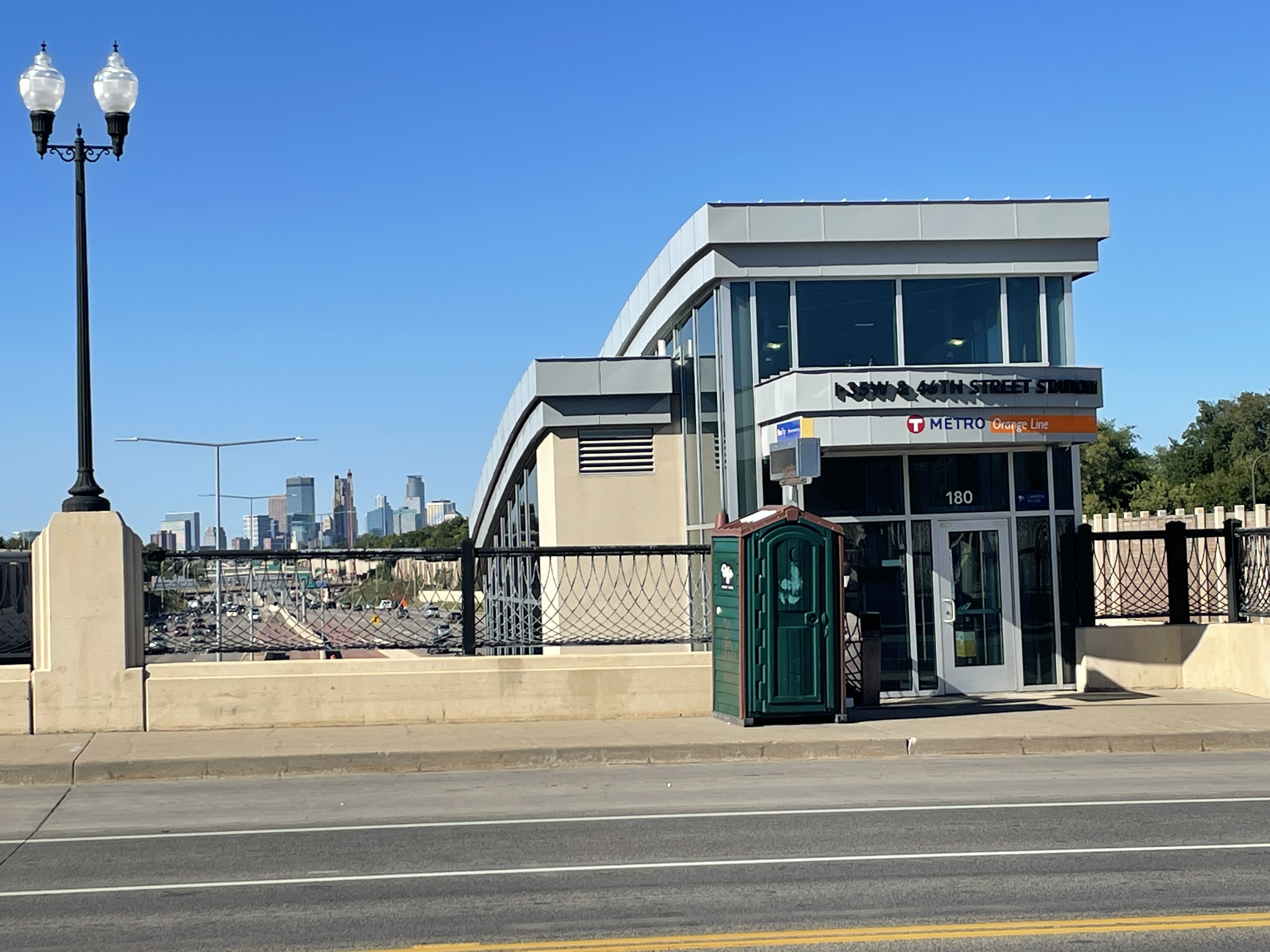
North entrance to the station from 46th Street.

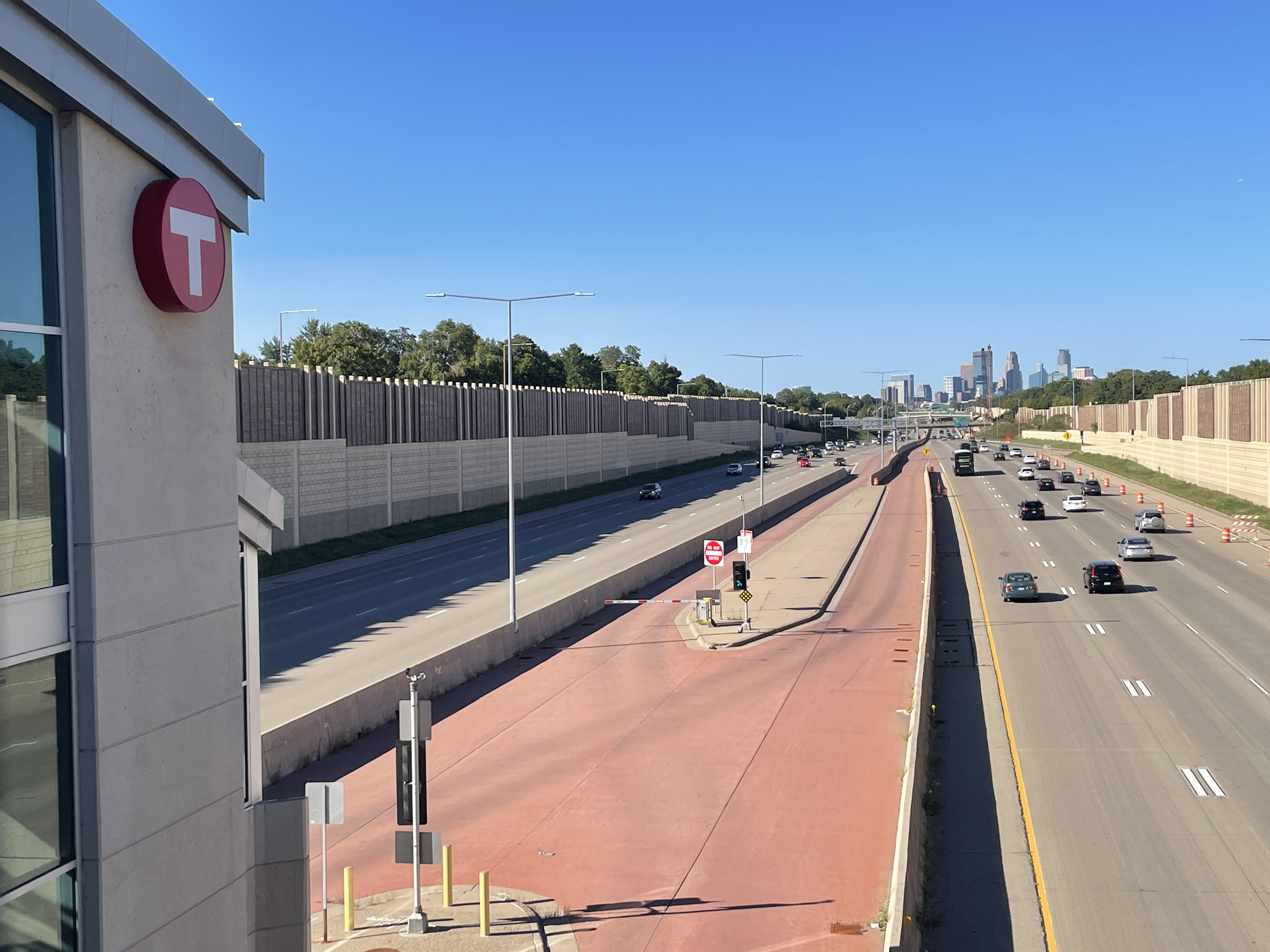
A view from the bridge towards downtown Minneapolis.
