= Marq2 transit corridor =

Public transit corridor through Minneapolis, Minnesota

Marq2
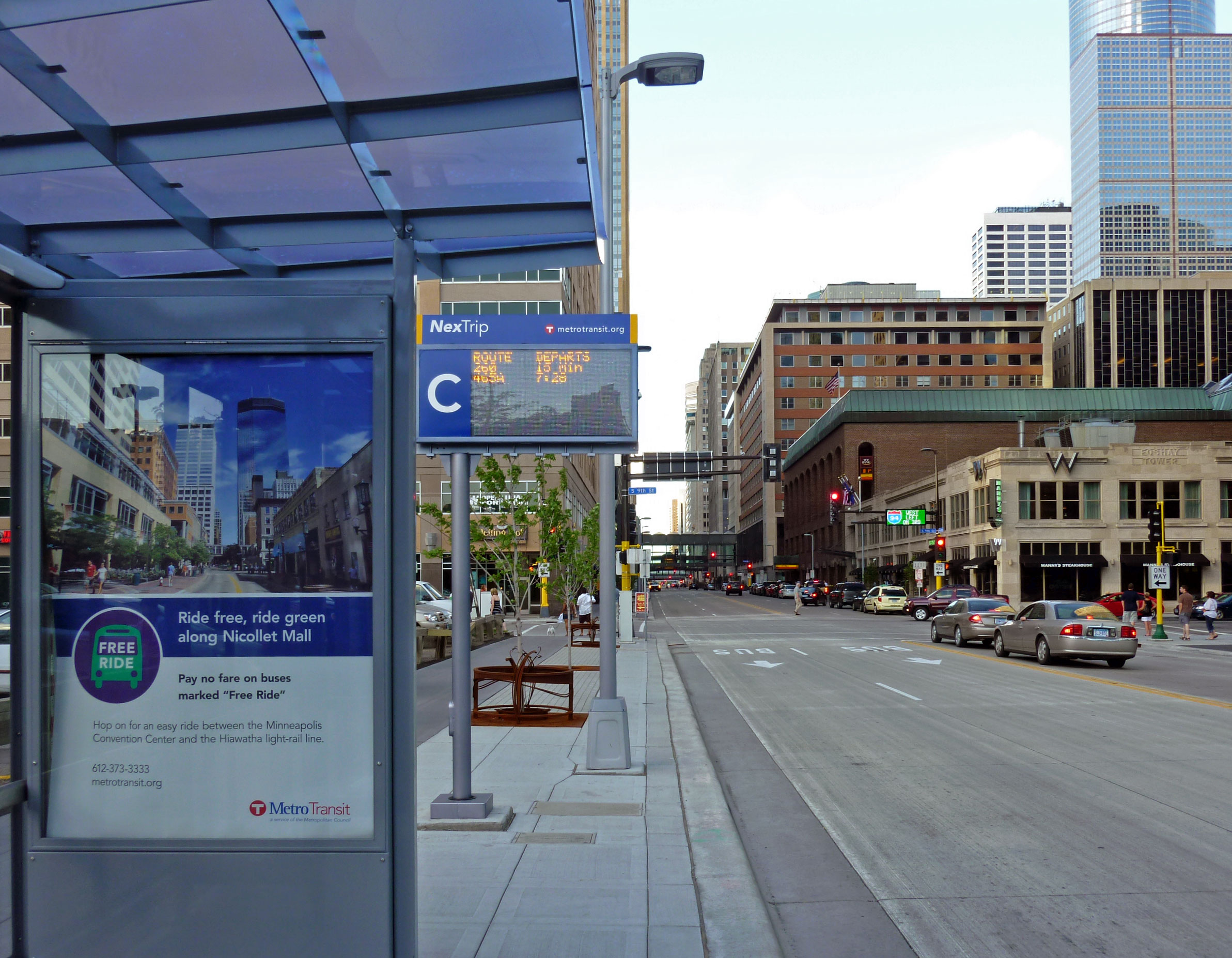
- Stop Group C on the Marq2 transit corridor.

Overview
- Operator: Metro Transit; Maple Grove Transit; Minnesota Valley Transit Authority; Plymouth Metrolink; SouthWest Transit
- Status: Open
- Began service: December 14, 2009

Route
- Route type: Bus rapid transit
- Locale: Minneapolis, Minnesota
- Start: Washington Avenue
- End: 12th Street

The Marq2 transit corridor is a north–south thoroughfare in Minneapolis, Minnesota, United States. It consists of the parallel streets of Marquette and Second avenues in the downtown area. Each public streetway has two contraflow bus lanes with two lanes available for general-purpose traffic in the opposite direction. Vehicular transit flows south on Marquette Avenue and north on Second Avenue. The inner curb lane allows buses to stop for riders, while the second bus-only lane allows buses to pass each other along the corridor. Bus routes that operate on the corridor stop at every other block at an assigned gate with each route assigned a northbound and southbound gate. Gates are assigned letters A, B, C, or D on Marquette Avenue and E, F, G, and H on Second Avenue. Custom bus shelters are installed at each stop with heaters and real time transit information. The corridor primarily serves express buses operated by all five public transit agencies in the Twin Cities.

Transit has existed in the corridor since 1879 with the opening of steam railways which were eventually replaced by streetcars, and then buses. After both streets were converted to one-way traffic, a contraflow bus lane was installed in the 1970s. Eventually the corridor's capacity became overwhelmed with the amount of buses so that operating conditions and speeds were severely impacted. The city of Minneapolis proposed consolidating express bus traffic in the city in the corridor and secured funding to reconstruct the streets in 2007. The redesign added an additional bus lane, increased space for pedestrians, and improved waiting amenities for customers. Upon opening in 2009, capacity for buses in the corridor was tripled, which allowed most express bus service in downtown Minneapolis to be consolidated onto the two streets. Operating speeds increased in the corridor, and some trips took 10 fewer minutes to travel out of downtown. The Metro Orange Line began using the corridor in 2021 when it began operation.

== History ==
Marquette and Second avenues have been important to mass transit since its introduction to Minneapolis. In May 1879 the Lyndale Railway Company opened the Motor Line along First Avenue (now Marquette), running from First Street near Minneapolis Union Depot to 13th Street, where it continued south along Nicollet Avenue. By the mid-1880s the steam trams operating the line became a nuisance downtown, and the company, now Minneapolis, Lyndale & Minnetonka Railway, responded with several forms of experimental traction along First Avenue. The company collaborated with Charles Van Depoele for trains to be towed by an electric locomotive between Washington Avenue and Sixth Street. There were three tests: one in December 1885 and in January and February 1886, all of which proved to be unsatisfactory. The electric locomotive experienced intense vibrations and other mechanical problems, and current collection was unreliable. Van Depoele personally invested $25,000 (equivalent to $895,833 in 2025) to perfect the system. The railway then adopted an experimental soda motor, where steam is generated by the addition of caustic soda to the boiler. These locomotives also proved to be unreliable. In 1887 Minneapolis passed an ordinance requiring the Motor Line to use cable or other source of power within city limits. Van Depoele's efforts had produced reliable electric traction, but the Minneapolis, Lyndale & Minnetonka Railway was suffering financially and could not adapt to the ordinance. This prompted the line to be leased to the Minneapolis Street Railway, later Twin Cities Rapid Transit, to operate the line and make the required improvements. First Avenue was electrified September 22, 1890, and the Motor Line was dissolved into First Avenue South streetcar lines.

Marquette and Second avenues became one-way streets in the 1950s. The first express buses to use Interstate 35W used Marquette and Second avenues while running through downtown in 1972. Contraflow bus lanes debuted on the corridor on September 29, 1974. Bus lanes were between 18 and 21 feet wide which is much wider than a standard 12 foot wide lane.

North-south bicycle traffic in Minneapolis began changing in the late 1990s, when proposals to ban bicycles from Nicollet Mall emerged. Bus drivers were concerned about unsafe conditions with sharing Nicollet Mall between bicycles and buses. One proposal had one direction of bus traffic on Nicollet Mall removed and bus traffic in that direction diverted to Marquette Avenue. The Minneapolis City Council was leaning towards separating north-south bus traffic onto Nicollet and Marquette until Metro Transit offered to help pay for installing bike lanes on Marquette and Second avenues in exchange for banning bicycles from Nicollet Mall for at least portions of the week. Ultimately bike lanes were installed on Marquette and Second avenues in September 1998, and bicycles were banned from Nicollet Mall on weekdays from 6 a.m. to 6 p.m.

== Capacity problems ==
The amount of bus traffic on the pair of lanes eventually overwhelmed the corridor's capacity and hampered operations. With bus stops on each block and only one bus travel lane, many buses would make two stops on each block with one at the beginning and the other at the end of the block. It regularly took buses two stoplight cycles to progress to the next block. Attempts were made to improve the corridor's performance with mixed results that often had their own drawbacks. Some bus routes were scheduled to travel in general-purpose lanes heading south on Second Avenue South, where buses heading south on the corridor would normally use Marquette Avenue. Other bus routes were moved to other streets like Nicollet Mall but travel times on Nicollet Mall were even slower than on the corridor. Faster travel times were available on nearby streets like Hennepin Avenue to the west or 3rd Avenue S to the east but both are further from downtown's central core.

Minneapolis developed a transportation plan in 2006 that proposed adding a second bus lane to speed up bus travel by allowing buses to pass each other. The 10-year transportation plan proposed concentrating all express buses serving the suburbs to use the Marquette and Second Avenue pair of streets. While many express buses used Marquette and Second avenues, some were still on Nicollet Mall. At the time there were also bike lanes on each street but the plan proposed that by removing the bike lanes and adding an additional bus lane, capacity in the corridor would be tripled. Wider sidewalks would also be added for riders waiting for the bus. Bus speeds in the corridor were only around 5 miles per hour (8.0 km/h) at the time. When the transportation plan was approved by the city council in 2007, it was estimated that changes could happen in five years at the earliest and only after the two streets were reconstructed with the goal of using a federal grant to help pay for the changes. Without the federal grant, changes would happen in 2012 at the earliest instead of 2009.

== Funding and construction ==
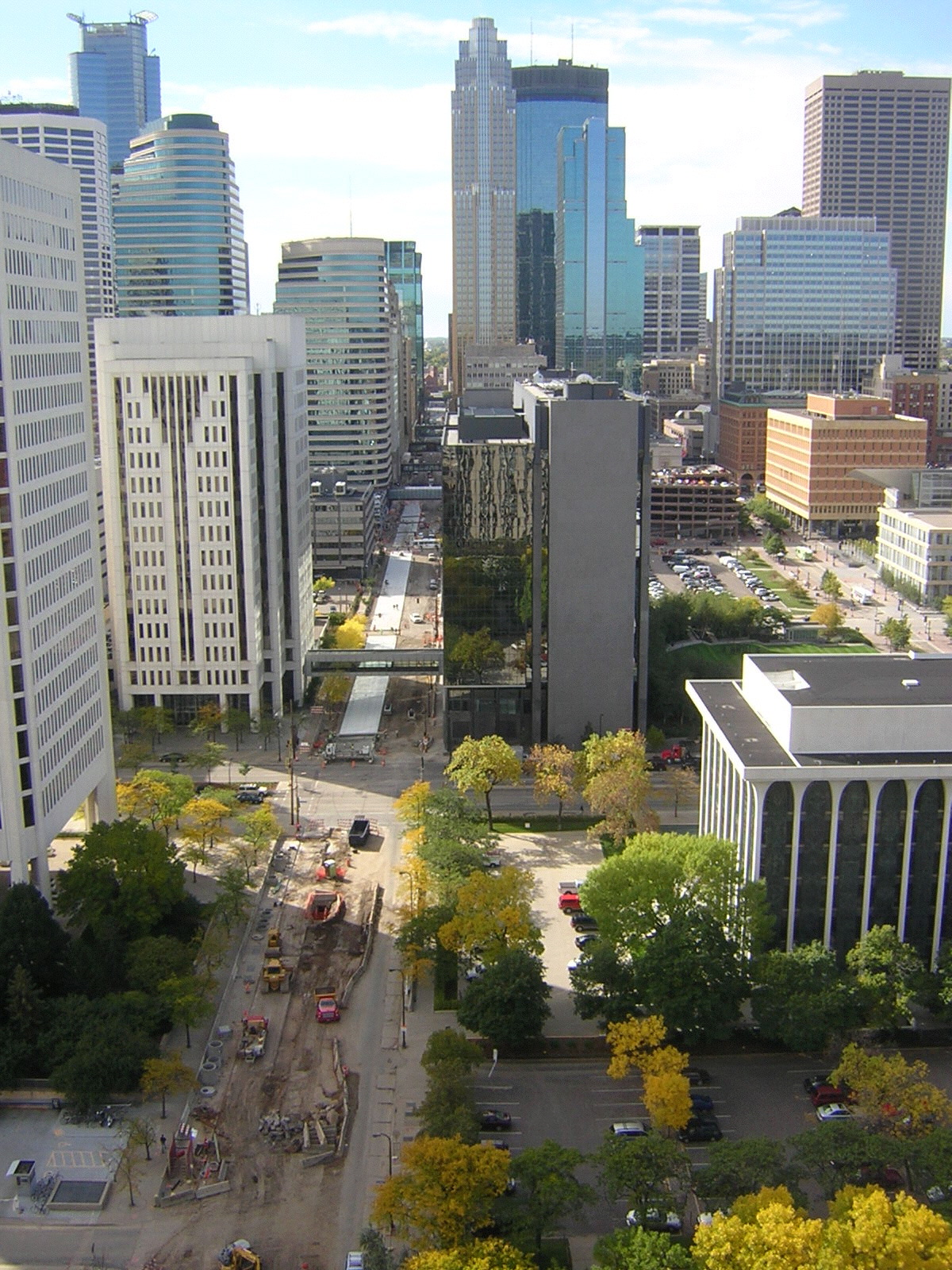
Marquette Avenue under construction in 2008

The federal government awarded the metropolitan region, as well as four other cities, funds in a program called the Urban Partnership Agreement in 2007. The $133 million grant would also fund other transit and roadway improvements like park and ride facilities and toll lanes along I-35W. Almost 30 cities had competed for the grants and the state of Minnesota matched the grant with $55 million of their own funding in June 2008. A planned opening of December 2009 was given for the bus lane improvements. The overall cost of the Marq2 portion of the Urban Partnership Agreement project cost was $32 million.

Construction was planned to begin after the 2008 Republican National Convention in September 2008. The project was constructed on an accelerated timeline that took roughly half the time it would typically take. Several techniques to ensure the accelerated construction timeline was successful were used, including early coordination of utility relocation and bonuses for construction contractors. The work on Marquette and Second avenues had a required completion of December 31, 2009, while other portions of the Urban Partnership Agreement project had later deadlines.

By removing express buses from Nicollet Mall, the mall was changed to allow bicycles at all times of day where previously bicycles were banned during peak periods. The change to Nicollet Mall allowed the existing bicycle lanes on the Marquette and Second Avenue pair of streets to be removed. Bus traffic on Nicollet Mall was reduced by 35 percent with the move of buses to the Marq2 corridor which improved the experience for pedestrians and sidewalk cafe patrons on Nicollet Mall. The loss of bike facilities in the corridor concerned groups like the Minneapolis Bicycle Coalition, which later became the transportation advocacy organization Our Streets Minneapolis. Along with allowing bicycles on Nicollet Mall all day, bicycles are allowed in the corridor bus lanes during off peak periods.

Bus travel times in the corridor were expected to improve by 5–10 minutes for each of the 1,400 weekday bus trips. Adding the second bus lane increased capacity from about 60 buses per hour to 180 buses per hour. The corridor consolidated around 80 percent of downtown transit service on the two streets. With 14 routes shifted from Nicollet Mall, a total of 67 bus routes would utilize the corridor shortly after opening. Metro Transit as well as the six suburban transit authorities, including Southwest Transit and Minnesota Valley Transit Authority, began using the corridor when it opened on December 14, 2009.

== Operations since opening ==
While the target speed of buses in the corridor was 8 miles per hour (13 km/h), average speeds for buses in the corridor increased from 3.5 miles per hour (5.6 km/h) to 5.5 miles per hour (8.9 km/h) after the new lanes opened. Ridership also increased from 23,700 to 28,000 rides per weekday. The greatest improvement in speeds was on Second Avenue South in the morning rush hour where speeds increased by 74 percent. Ridership in the I-35W south corridor increased by 9 percent between 2009 and 2011 and at least 85 percent of riders rated bus reliability and travel times as good or very good. Around half of riders surveyed said the Marq2 project increased bus speeds and reliability. Buses from I-94 West, I-35W North, I-35W South, and I-394 all fed into the Marq2 lanes, which made them the busiest transit corridor in downtown Minneapolis. The number of buses on the corridor increase by 52 percent in the afternoon rush hour.

The addition of the heated shelters on Marq2 in combination with A Line heated shelters was identified in 2018 as a source of potential disparate impact and disproportionate burden for low-income and minority riders. This was because Marq2 riders are predominantly not low-income or minority, while other riders in the Metro Transit system—that were more likely to be low-income or minorities—did not receive the same level of benefits. These evaluations are required as part of Title VI of the Civil Rights Act of 1964. To maintain compliance with Title VI, heated shelters were added on Nicollet Mall and other locations that serve more low-income and minority riders.

Utility work closed a portion of Marquette Avenue to buses in 2019. When buses were shifted to the general-purpose lanes on Second Avenue, severe congestion impacted the ability of buses to exit downtown and resulted in long delays of up to an hour. Southwest Transit officials wrote a letter to the city of Minneapolis requesting improved priority for buses, which they felt were not being given priority by traffic control agents. The city of Minneapolis insisted that buses were given priority and met with Southwest Transit, Minnesota Valley Transportation Authority, and Metro Transit officials to discuss the traffic congestion and transit. Minneapolis adjusted signal light timing and parking meters to improve conditions for transit. Minnesota Valley Transportation Authority eventually temporarily detoured several bus routes off of the transit only lanes on Marquette to 4th and 3rd Avenues South in an effort to improve travel times.

While the first real-time information signs used cellular connections to receive data, upgrades on 36 signs in the corridor were replaced with signs that have fiber optic connections in 2021. The change was partially done to improve reliability of the signs as sign unreliability was a frequent customer complaint. The Metro Orange Line was designed around using the corridor, and during planning stages, project staff identified several possibilities on connecting I-35W to the Marq2 lanes. The final design included a transit-only ramp from I-35W to 12th Street where buses could either travel eastbound using general-purpose lanes to the 12th Street Ramp on the E-ZPass lanes or travel westbound from the ramp to a bus-only contraflow lane connecting to Marq2. The Orange Line began using the Marq2 transit lanes on December 4, 2021, when the line began service. Most intersections along the corridor allow for transit signal priority for Orange Line buses.

== Design ==
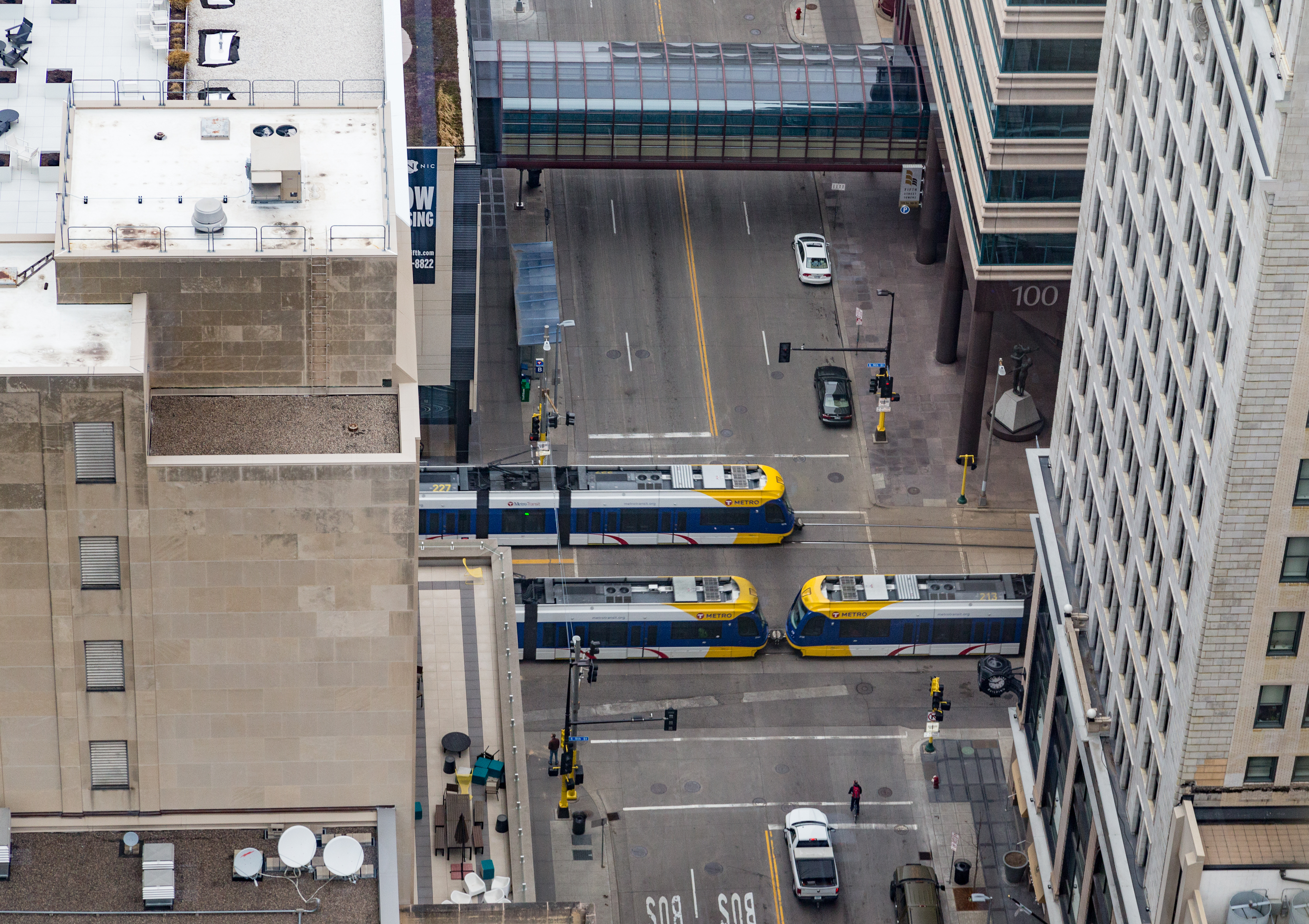
View of contraflow lanes from above at Fifth Street where the Blue and Green Lines operate

The designed project covers 24 blocks. The design was partially inspired by the Portland Transit Mall. Each roadway contains four lanes, two in either direction. Buses travel southbound on Marquette Avenue and northbound on Second Avenue, with general traffic operating the opposite direction in the other lanes. Each stop can accommodate two buses, with there being two stops per block. The inner lane allows buses to pass stopped buses.

Marquette and Second avenues are 80 feet (24 m) wide from building width to building width. The total width of the paved street is 49 feet (15 m) with 21 feet (6.4 m) dedicated to pedestrian and streetscape uses. Initially the construction design called for a concrete roadway for buses and asphalt for general-purpose traffic in the other direction, but an all concrete roadway surface was close enough in cost that an all concrete roadway was built. The previous road surface was recycled and used as a base with 9 inches (23 cm) of reinforced concrete place on top. The curing process for the roadway took two to three days. The concrete roadway stands in contrast to the mostly asphalt streets within the rest of downtown. The curbside bus lane is 11 feet (3.4 m) feet wide while the second passing lane is 13 feet (4.0 m) feet wide.

As part of pedestrian and streetscape improvements, 200 trees were added to the corridor. The trees were held in structural cells designed to allow for tree growth and the cells were covered with 15,000 square feet (1,400 m^{2}) of porous pavers to allow for some storm water retention. Buried underground were 11,000 plastic cells that look like milk crates. The cells are filled with soil which prevents soil compaction but still allows for excess water to leave the system. Up to 21,000 cubic feet (590 m^{3}) of storm water is diverted from the sewer system after a rainstorm. The system also helps increase the lifespan of street trees, which are otherwise frequently replaced after only five to seven years. With an average of 588 cubic feet (16.7 m^{3}) of soil dedicated for each tree, each tree pit captures water from an average surface area of 300 square feet (28 m^{2}). The overall cost of the system was about $8,038 per tree. After seven years many of the trees were no longer looking as healthy as when they were planted. The manufacturer of the cell system conducted a study to see why the trees were struggling and blamed trees planted at an improper depth and tree root girdling as the primary reasons for the decline.

== Stops and stations ==
Stops along the corridor are organized by gates, with buses stopping every other block at their designated gate. Gates on Marquette Avenue are lettered A, B, C, and D, and gates on Second Avenue are lettered E, F, G, and H. Orange Line buses stop at most C and F gates, which are enhanced with pylon markers, additional security and real-time departures, and off-board fare collection. Bus stops at each gate are 135 feet (41 m) long. Gates are spaced 40 feet (12 m) apart.

Custom transit shelters were installed at opening, and sidewalks on the bus stop side of the street are three feet (0.91 m) wider than on the other side. The average annual maintenance costs for each shelter was $5,038 in 2016.
