= Southtown Center =

Shopping mall in Hennepin County, Minnesota, U.S.

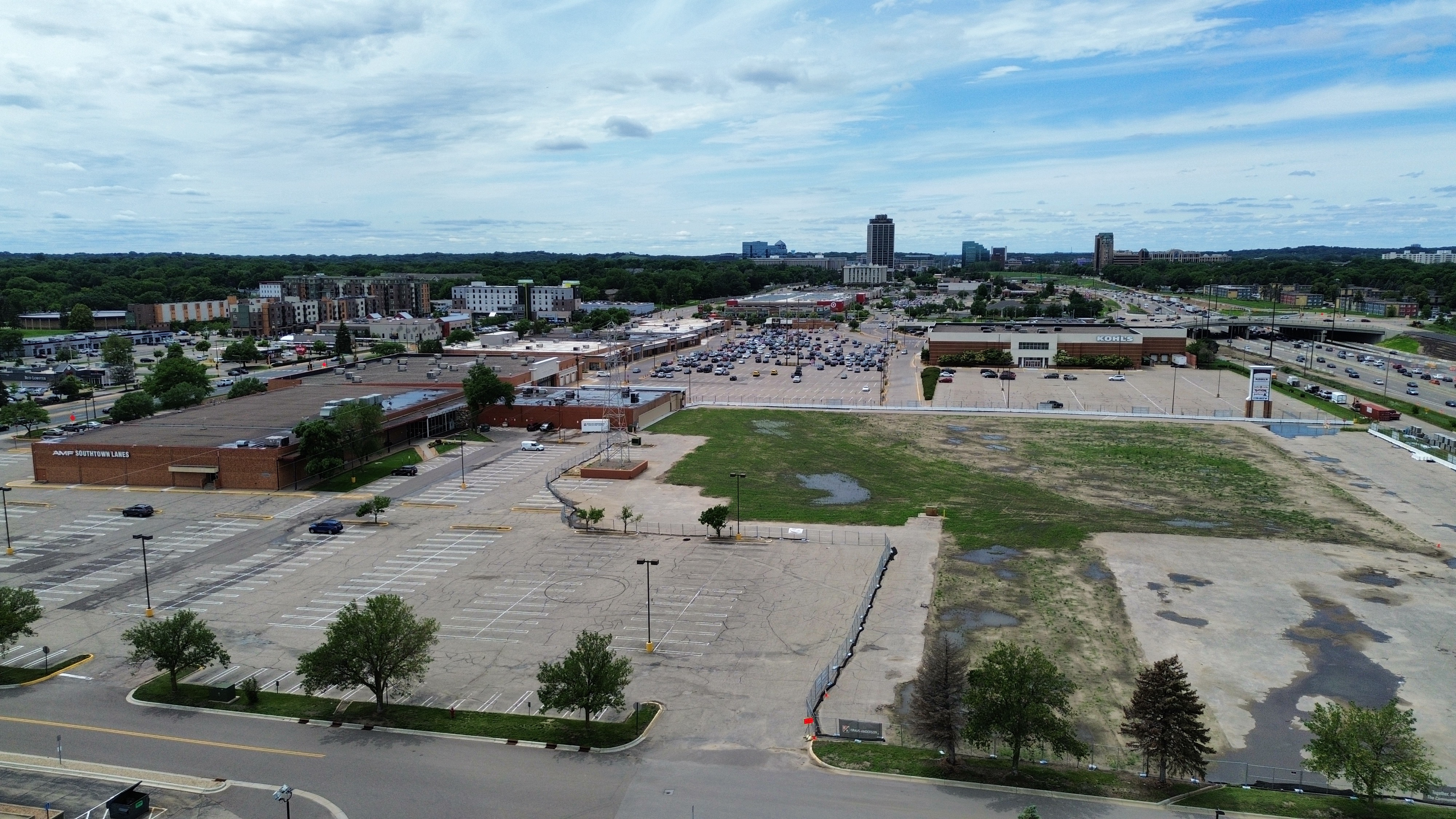
- Southtown Center looking west over the demolished Herberger's and Toys "R" Us stores in June 2024.
- Location: Bloomington, Minnesota, U.S.
- Coordinates: 44°51′37″N 93°18′18″W
- Address: 7800 Penn Avenue South (at Interstate 494)
- Opened: November 3, 1960
- Developer: Kraus-Anderson, Inc.
- Manager: Kraus-Anderson, Inc.
- Owner: Kraus-Anderson, Inc.
- Num. of stores: 38
- Num. of anchor tenants: 5 (4 open, 2 vacant)
- Floor area: 534,650 square feet (50,000 m^{2})
- Floors: 1 (2 in Kohl's and former Herberger's)
- Parking: 2,100
- Public transit: Metro Transit
- Website: southtownbloomington.com

Southtown Center, colloquially known as Southtown, is a regional shopping mall in Bloomington, Minnesota, a suburb of the Twin Cities. Southtown Center consists of 534,650 square feet (50,000 m^{2}) of retail space. The center contains 38 retail tenants and is anchored by AMF Bowling Centers, Kohl's, and TJ Maxx.

The first phase of Southtown Center opened on November 3, 1960, with two more phases proceeding in 1963 and 1964. The mall is partially enclosed, while the majority of the center contains open air structures. Several additional buildings were constructed on the property throughout the years, while minimal renovations took place to maintain the mall's appearance.

== History ==
=== 1960–62: Construction, grand opening, and additions ===
Southtown Center opened on November 3, 1960 in Bloomington, Minnesota and became Bloomington's "first regional shopping center". The center was developed by Kraus-Anderson, Inc., a Bloomington-based construction firm, with founder Lloyd Engelsma taking over as the site's project manager. According to Engelsma, Southtown was built atop "a strip of cow pasture" near a busy intersection in Bloomington, taking up nearly 37 acres of land; Engelsma had "high expectations for the new center." During construction of the mall, three labor strikes occurred which heavily delayed construction; unideal and inclement weather created further setbacks during the construction. Montgomery Ward, a Chicago-based department store, announced that they would be opening up a location at Southtown, and became the mall's only anchor; Ward filled a 188,050 square feet (17,000 m^{2}) building, the largest Ward department store in the United States.

The center's former movie theater.

After the center's opening, several additions took place at the mall. During 1963, a 43,000 square feet (4,000 m^{2}) AMF Bowling Center was constructed on the north side of the property; the bowling alley is still currently in use today. In 1964, a Mann Theatres was constructed on the property; Southtown Mann Theatre became the first movie theater to be attached to a shopping center in the Twin Cities. However, the cinema was completely remodeled in 1980, removing some of its original decor, before being torn down in 1995 to make way for additional retail. Southtown was also home to Minnesota's first ShowBiz Pizza Place that opened in late 1981.

=== 1998–present: Store closings and rezoning ===
Montgomery Ward prospered as Southtown's largest tenant until 1998, when Ward announced that they would be closing nine underperforming locations as part of their "ongoing operations and strategic initiatives to return to profitability." Filling Ward's vacancy was Herberger's, a Minnesota department store, who had agreed to purchase several other closed Montgomery Ward stores in the Twin Cities area. Toys "R" Us agreed to lease the other side of the Ward store that Herberger's had not leased.

In September 2014, several plans were created by the city of Bloomington in order to rezone several parts of the shopping center. However, Southtown's owner, Kraus-Anderson, stated that the rezoning would "threaten Southtown's existence and that customers like things how they are." Several Bloomington locals and customers of Southtown created a website to persuade the city of Bloomington not to continue with any redeveloping plans. Despite the creation of the website and Kraus-Anderson's frustration and concern during the proposed redevelopment, the city council approved the project in July 2015. The rezoning will encourage more pedestrian and transit supportive development patterns. New developments could include multi-story mixed-use developments and a new street grid. As part of the agreement, a 3-acre portion in the southeast of the mall would be preserved to be a higher-intensity density development. In April of the same year, Southtown's 44,548 square feet (4,100 m^{2}) Toys "R" Us closed after their 26-year lease expired. Despite this closing, Southtown Center has maintained a 99 percent occupancy rate for many years.

== Post rezoning in 2015 ==
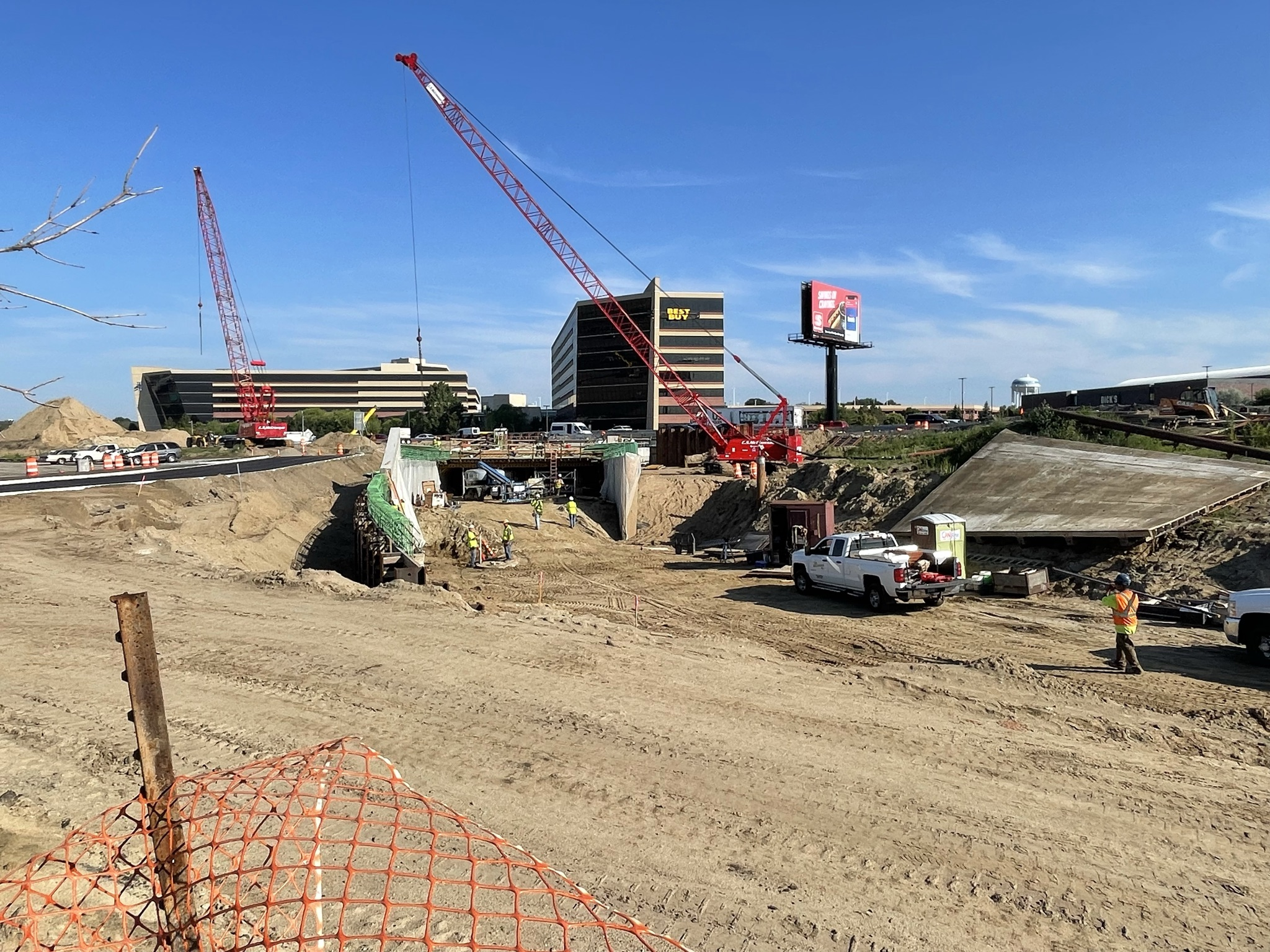
Knox Ave Transitway under construction

The Metro Orange Line travels along Knox Ave adjacent to the site. During the 2015 rezoning discussions, the location of the transitway in relation to Southtown was a point of disagreement. Plans for the transitway first called for a trench direction from Knox Ave to travel underneath I-494, but Kraus-Anderson called for a loop around a restaurant to the east to preserve future development options. The design with the loop was ultimately built and opened in 2021.

The Southtown location of Hancock Fabrics was one of three Minnesota locations closing in 2016 as Hancock Fabrics faced bankruptcy. On April 18, 2018, it was announced that Herberger's would be closing as parent company The Bon-Ton Stores was going out of business. The store closed on August 29, 2018. Bed Bath & Beyond announced the Southtown location would close in 2023 amidst the closing of 150 other stores due to financial issues.

Kraus-Anderson proposed building a Hy-Vee grocery and liquor store at the site in 2021. The proposal was withdrawn a few months later as Hy-Vee changed plans about expanding into the Twin Cities.The vacant Herberger's and Toys "R" Us stores were torn down in January 2024. In December 2024, plans for Dick's House of Sport consisting of a two-story, 120,000-square-foot with an 18,000-square-foot outdoor athletic field, as well as site improvements such as landscaping and sidewalks, and a future phase medical office. Slumberland Furniture began the process of relocating its Bloomington location that had previously been just west of Southtown to the former Bed Bath & Beyond building in 2024.

The Hold Steady released a song on their Boys and Girls in America record titled "Southtown Girls" which features directions to Southtown Center. The Hold Steady lead sing, Craig Finn, grew up in nearby Edina, Minnesota.
