= Metro Orange Line (Minnesota) =

Bus rapid transit line

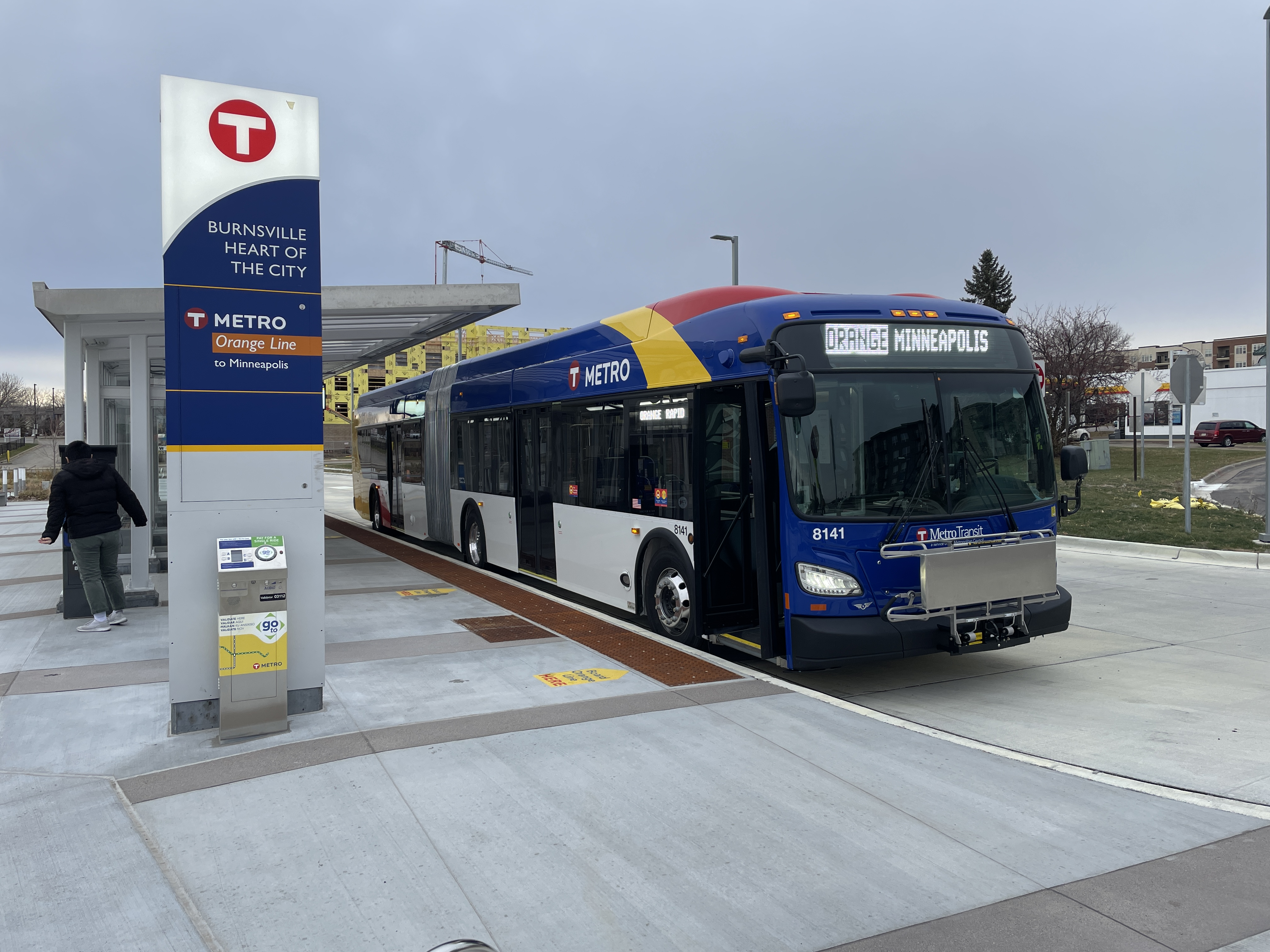
- An Orange Line bus laying over at the southern terminus

Overview
- System: Metro
- Operator: Metro Transit
- Garage: South
- Vehicle: New Flyer XD60
- Status: Operational
- Began service: December 4, 2021
- Predecessors: 535

Route
- Route type: Bus rapid transit
- Locale: (Hennepin County); Minneapolis, Minnesota; Richfield, Minnesota; Bloomington, Minnesota (Dakota County); Burnsville, Minnesota
- Start: Downtown Minneapolis
- Via: I-35W
- End: Burnsville, Minnesota
- Length: 17 miles (27 km)
- Stations: 12 (4 station pairs downtown)

Service
- Journey time: 35 minutes
- Ridership: 2,023 (avg. weekday, 2025)

The Metro Orange Line is a bus rapid transit line in the Twin Cities, Minnesota operated by Metro Transit. The line operates primarily along Interstate 35W from downtown Minneapolis through Richfield and Bloomington before terminating in Burnsville, Minnesota. The Orange Line provides access to 198,000 jobs with roughly a quarter of them outside downtown Minneapolis. The route serves a mix of stations located in the center of the highway, stations near highway exits, and on-street stations. The line has features typical of bus rapid transit systems with off-board fare payment, articulated buses with extra doors, stations with improved passenger amenities, and transit-only bus lanes on portions of the route.

Express bus service in the I-35W corridor has existed since the 1970s and efforts to improve transit in the corridor through light rail or bus rapid transit have been worked on for nearly as long. Bus rapid transit was identified for study in the early 2000s and several transit facility improvements in the corridor were made by 2009 through grants by the federal government. The project was known as the I-35W Bus Rapid Transitway until July 2011 when the Metropolitan Council officially renamed the project the METRO Orange Line as part of the branding of the METRO system. Identifying funds to improve the transitway was difficult despite the project drawing bipartisan support. Full funding for the project was secured in 2018. Construction was completed in 2021 and the line opened December 4, 2021. By 2040, an estimated 11,400 rides a day will be taken on the Orange Line and facility improvements along the corridor funded as part of the project will benefit 26,500 rides a day.

== Route description ==
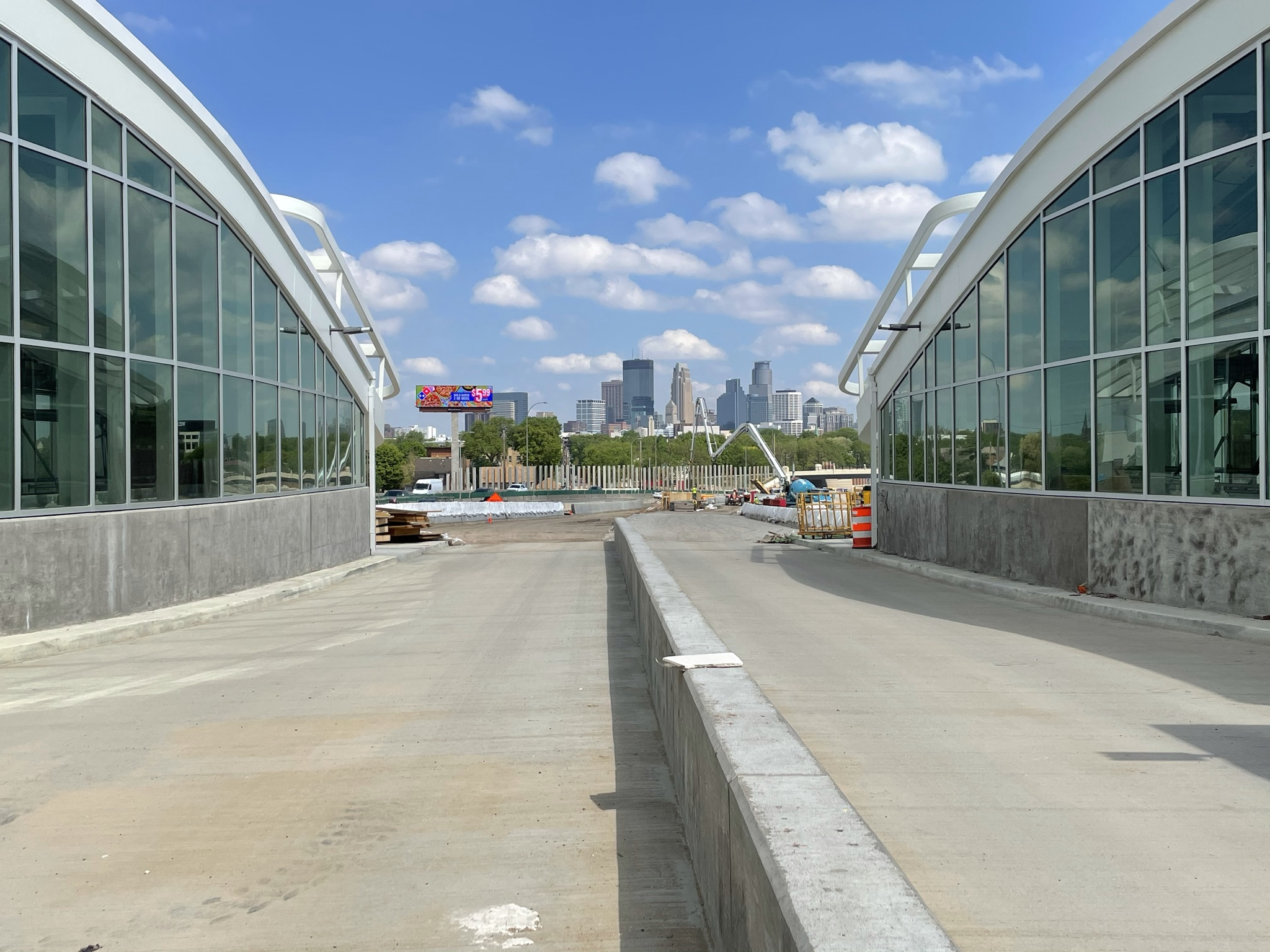
A view from the Lake St. Station towards downtown Minneapolis

An Orange Line bus going north on Interstate 35W.

The Orange Line's northern terminus is a pair of stops at 3rd St in downtown Minneapolis. The first four stops at 3rd St, 5th St, 7th St, and 11th St are on paired one-way streets, Marquette Ave and 2nd Ave. The two streets were redesigned for transit improvements in 2009 as part of an Urban Partnership Agreement that brought contraflow bus lanes to the streets. The Marq2 transit corridor serves 80 percent of express bus trips to downtown Minneapolis from regional park and ride facilities. From downtown, buses connect directly to the I-35W MnPASS lanes on a ramp constructed for only transit vehicles that will serve 700 weekday bus trips. While traveling along the MnPASS lanes, the route serves two stops located in the center of the highway at Lake St and 46th St. After passing Minnesota State Highway 62, buses exit the freeway to serve stops at 66th St before reentering the freeway. The route travels off the freeway to serve stations and a park and ride at Knox Ave and 76th St near the Best Buy Richfield headquarters. The transit-only Knox Avenue transitway travels underneath I-494 to the American Blvd station located near Southtown Center and the Penn-American district in Bloomington. The route re-enters I-35W for a short distance before again exiting at 98th St to serve the South Bloomington Transit Center and park and ride. The route crosses the Minnesota River and enters Burnsville to serve the final pair of stops in a loop. The Heart of the City station is located near Minnesota State Highway 13 and the Burnsville Transit Station.

=== Route ===
Metro Orange Line interactive map

== History ==
The I-35W corridor has a long history of transit, being the first freeway in the Twin Cities to have express bus service, starting in 1968. 14 routes used I-35W by 1972. Ramp metering that allowed buses to bypass the delay was brought to the corridor in 1974. Beginning in the mid-to-late 1980s light rail was studied but nothing was done. A commuter rail line that was proposed between Minneapolis and Northfield was halted in 2002 by the Minnesota Legislature banning public money from going to studies of the line. The state legislature mandated MnDOT study bus rapid transit on the corridor in 2003.

=== Background work ===
In January 2005, the Minnesota Department of Transportation released their plans to improve transit service on the corridor. They chose that BRT using existing and proposed HOV lanes would be the best option. This came just a month after Metro Transit did a complete restructure of I-35W bus services, adding better service to the corridor, including new route 535, an all-day highly frequent bus route between Downtown Minneapolis and South Bloomington Transit Center. Metro Transit's future plans in the restructure report show possible expansion of Route 535's service from just weekdays to everyday service, and route extensions to the University of Minnesota, and south to Burnsville Transit Station. About 20–30 years ago a bus stop was built on the I-35W bridge over Lake Street. The Crosstown Commons section of the freeway was reconstructed from 2007 to 2010. The project extended HOV lanes north to 42nd Street and added a station located in the median of the freeway at 46th Street. Future MNDOT and Metro Transit plans to relocate the Lake St. Station to the median of the freeway.

A 2007, $133.3 million, Federal-State Urban Partnership Agreement, designed to alleviate congestion in the Minneapolis area, allowed the construction of a center high-occupancy toll lane or price-dynamic shoulder lane (for the exclusive use of buses, high-occupancy vehicles, and drivers willing to pay the dynamically priced toll) running on I-35W from Lakeville to downtown Minneapolis—a lane that could be used for the planned BRT line.

=== Orange Line development ===
Highway BRT on I-35W was included in plans for the 2030 Transportation Policy Plan in 2010. Plans released in 2012 called for the METRO Orange Line to run from downtown Minneapolis to the "offline" (off-highway) Burnsville Transit Station, stopping at the "online" (on-highway) stations at Lake Street, 46th Street, and American Boulevard, and the "inline" (slightly off-highway) stations at 66th Street and 98th Street, with a potential extension to the Kenrick Ave Park and Ride in Lakeville that had been created with Urban Partnership Agreement funds.

Plans in 2014 showed 100 buses an hour were expected to travel through the Lake St Station. Funding for the $150 million project was identified from local, state, federal, and Metropolitan Council funds including 30% from the Counties Transit Improvement Board. Project development approval for engineering and environmental work was granted by the FTA in 2014, and a decision on an additional $64 million in funding was expected by 2016. The corridor had 14,000 riders in 2014 with an estimated 20,000 by 2030. Routing of the Orange Line through the Southtown Center area created issues during rezoning and redevelopment plans in 2015. An opening date of 2019 was still expected in 2015 with updated ridership estimates showing 11,400 Orange Line rides and 26,500 corridor rides by 2040. There were concerns about the final routing in Burnsville and if traveling off I-35W to serve the Heart of the City would add too much time for riders, with comparisons made to the Metro Red Line and the Cedar Grove Transit Station. Additional travel time would have been especially an issue if the route was extended further to the Kenrick Avenue Park and Ride station in Lakeville in the future. Ultimately two stations in Burnsville served in a loop were approved with the design allaying Dakota County commissioner concerns.

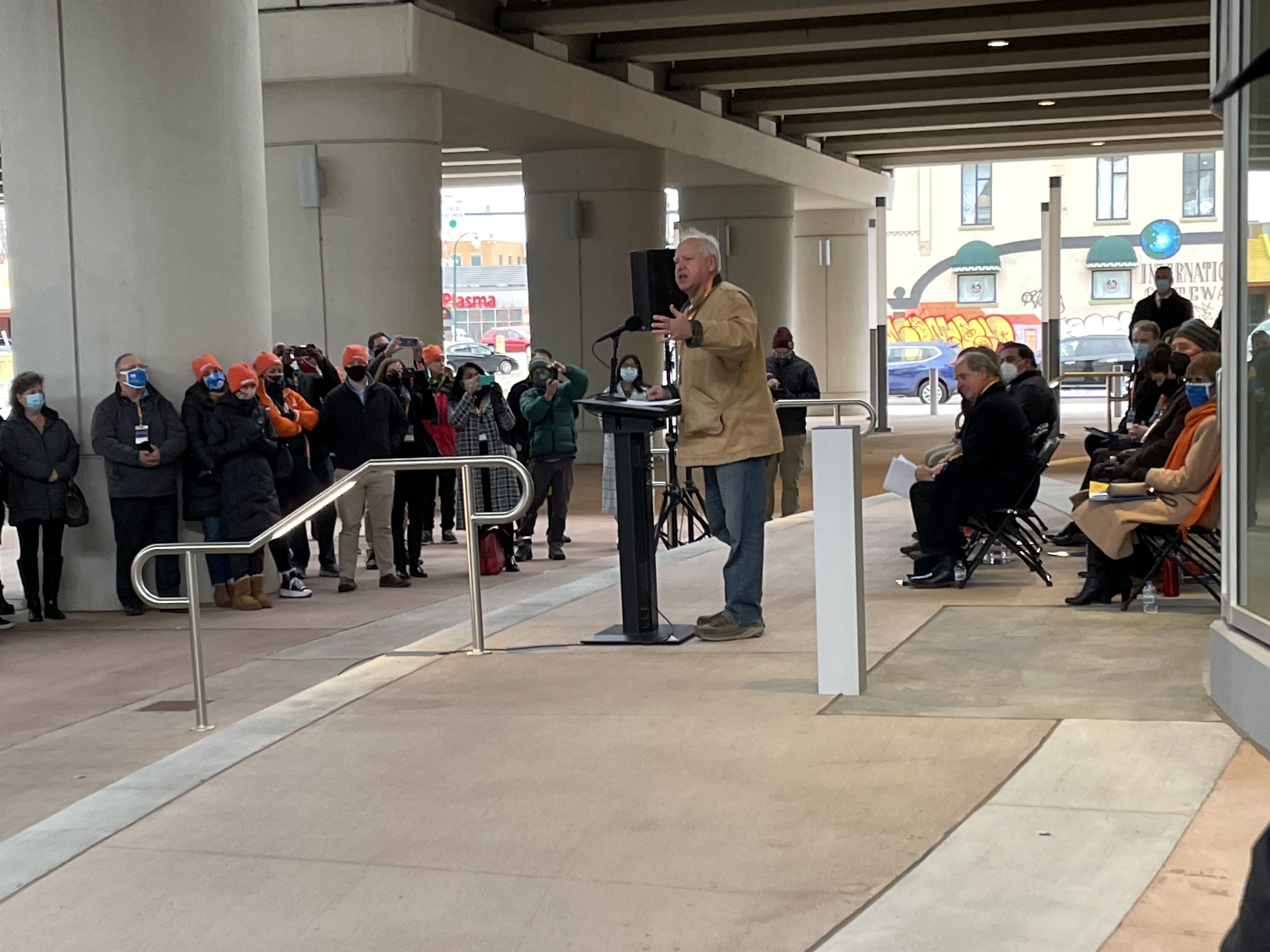
Minnesota governor Tim Walz speaking at the opening ceremony of the line

After Dakota County withdrew from CTIB causing its dissolution and the failure to secure funding from the state during the 2016 legislative session, concerns about the financial viability of the line were questioned. $45 million for the project was expected to come from CTIB and $12 million from the state. The line drew bipartisan support from cities and elected officials, partially due to lower costs compared to light rail projects like the Metro Green Line Extension. CTIB reduced its contribution which required Dakota County, Hennepin County, and the Metropolitan Council to make up the gap. Ultimately, CTIB only contributed $8.6 million with Hennepin County, Dakota County, and their regional railroad authorities covering the gap.

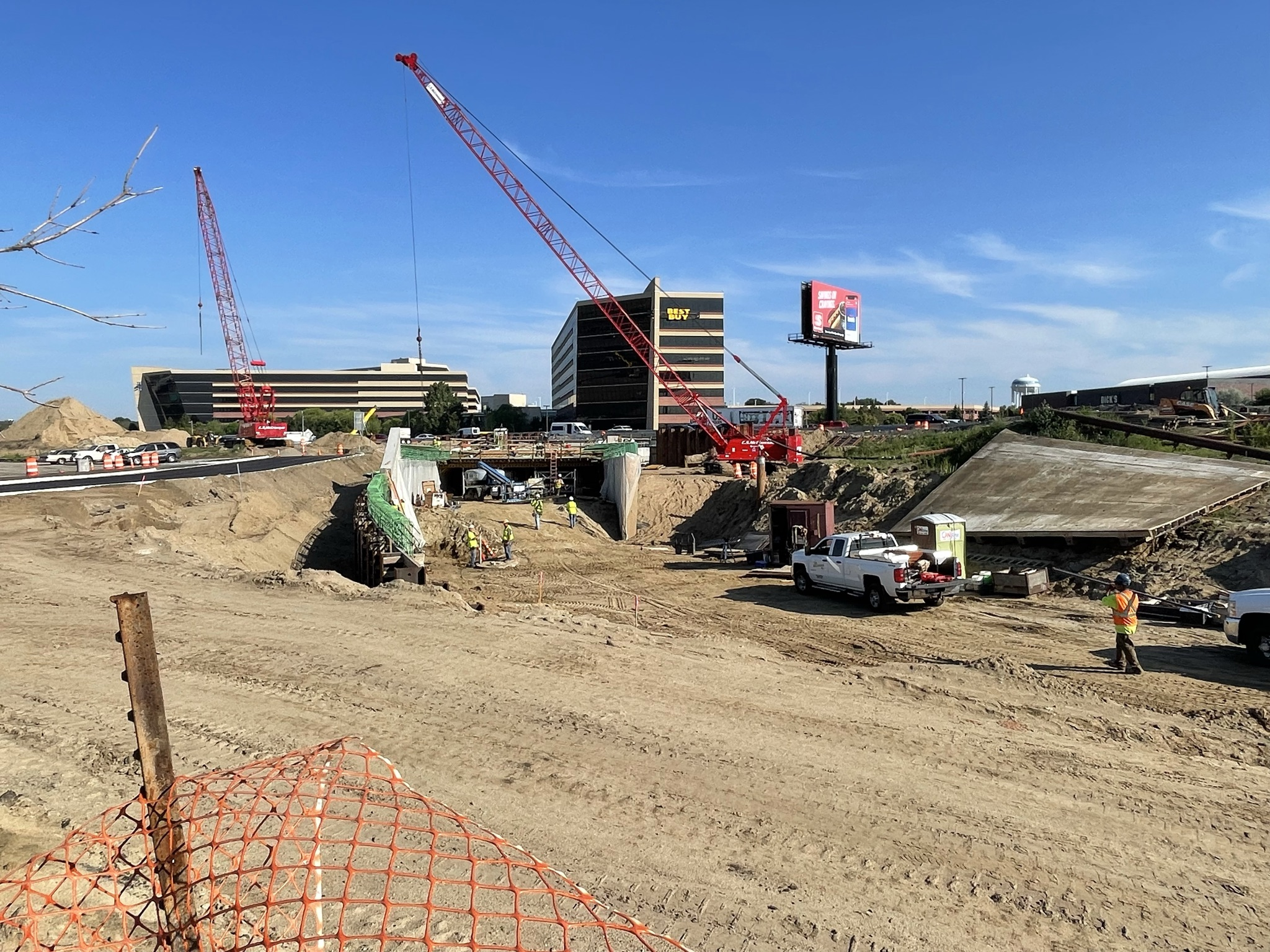
The south portal of the under-construction Knox Ave. Transitway

By November 2016, preliminary designs of the stations were completed and opened to public comment. With FTA approval, the Orange Line began construction in 2017, despite a lack of committed federal funding. The construction began as a part of Minnesota Department of Transportation's larger Downtown-to-Crosstown road construction project on I-35W. In November 2018 the Orange Line secured $74 million in federal funding. This was the last portion of the funding to be secured for the $150.7 million project. A groundbreaking ceremony for construction was held in July 2019 and service began on December 4, 2021. By May 2022, weekday ridership on the Orange Line passed 1,000 rides a day, double the ridership served by the bus route it replaced, Route 535. Weekend service, which did not exist on Route 535, was serving 300-400 rides a day.

== Features ==
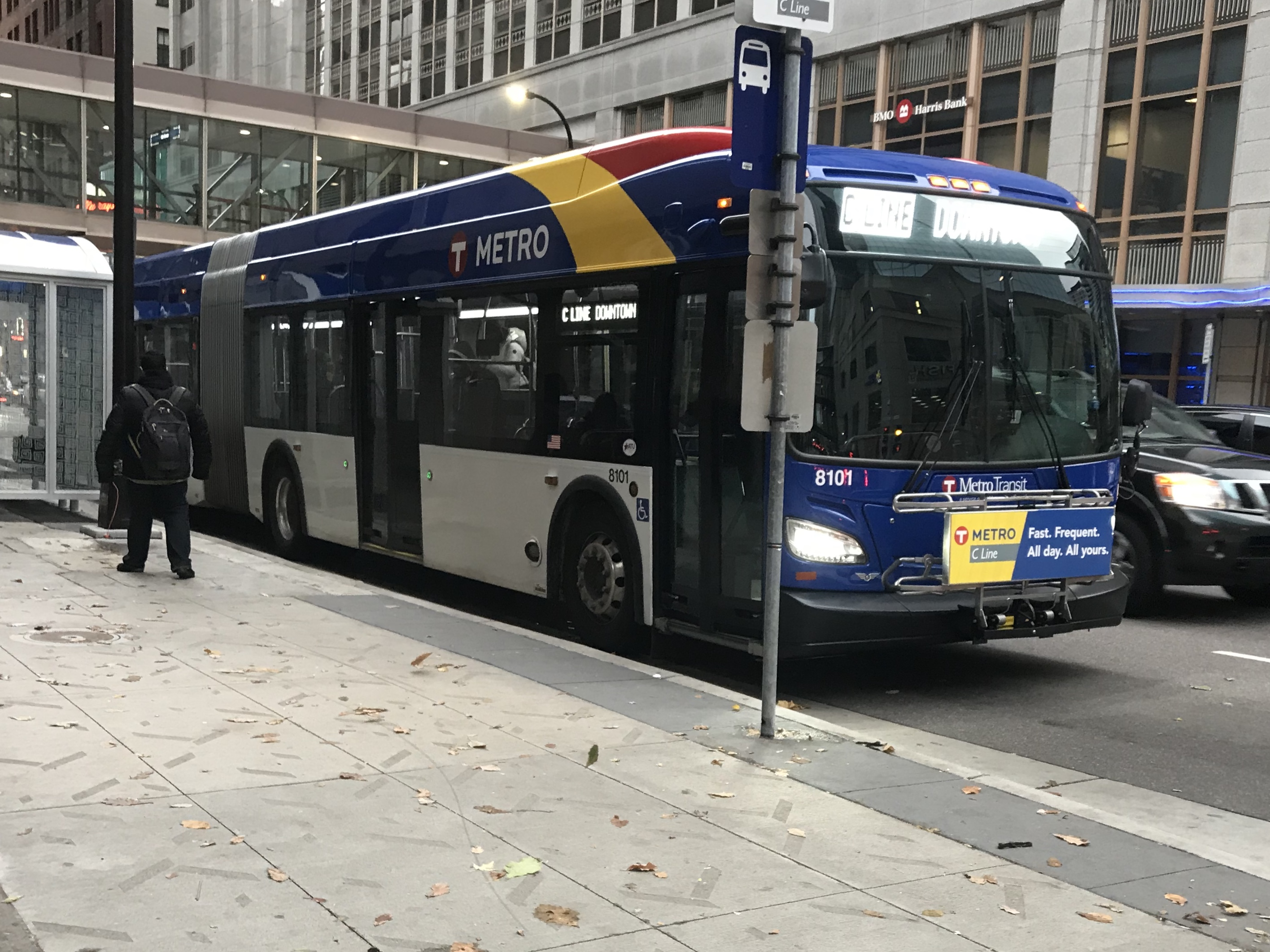
Articulated bus in METRO livery used on the Orange Line

The Orange Line has many bus rapid transit features although it lacks some features considered needed for a true bus rapid transit system such as dedicated lanes throughout. From downtown Minneapolis, the Orange Line operates in the Marq2 transit corridor which has contraflow bus lanes. A transit-only ramp allows for a direct connection from 12th St in downtown to the I-35W MnPASS lanes. While traveling through Minneapolis the Orange Line operates in MnPASS lanes which are HOT lanes that guarantee consistent travel times through the corridor through dynamic pricing. Stations at Lake St and 46th St are served in the center of the highway eliminating the need to exit and re-enter the freeway. While serving stations at 76th St and American Blvd the line travels on a transit-only tunnel under I-494 which allows for a direct path between two activity centers in Richfield and Bloomington.

Buses on the Orange Line are diesel articulated with three doors and wider aisles. The buses are branded to match the METRO system.

Service on the route was expected to be every 10 minutes during rush hours and every 15 minutes in off-peak times with larger headways during early mornings and late evenings. Due to a bus driver shortage, the Orange Line opened with 15-minute headways all day during weekdays with less frequent service during early mornings and evenings. Buses come every 30 minutes on Saturdays and Sundays.

Transit service in the corridor was reevaluated and redesigned similarly to how service changed when the Metro Green Line opened in 2014. An initial service redesign was presented to the public in January 2021 for public comment with a final plan sent to the Metropolitan Council for approval in May 2021. The final proposal increased transit service hours 20% on weekdays. Changes were proposed for 11 existing routes, complemented with the addition of five new routes. Ultimately a driver shortage prevented all changes from being implemented upon opening day on December 4, 2021. Minnesota Valley Transit Authority added a route to serve the Orange Line in Burnsville at the Heart of the City station.

== Stations ==
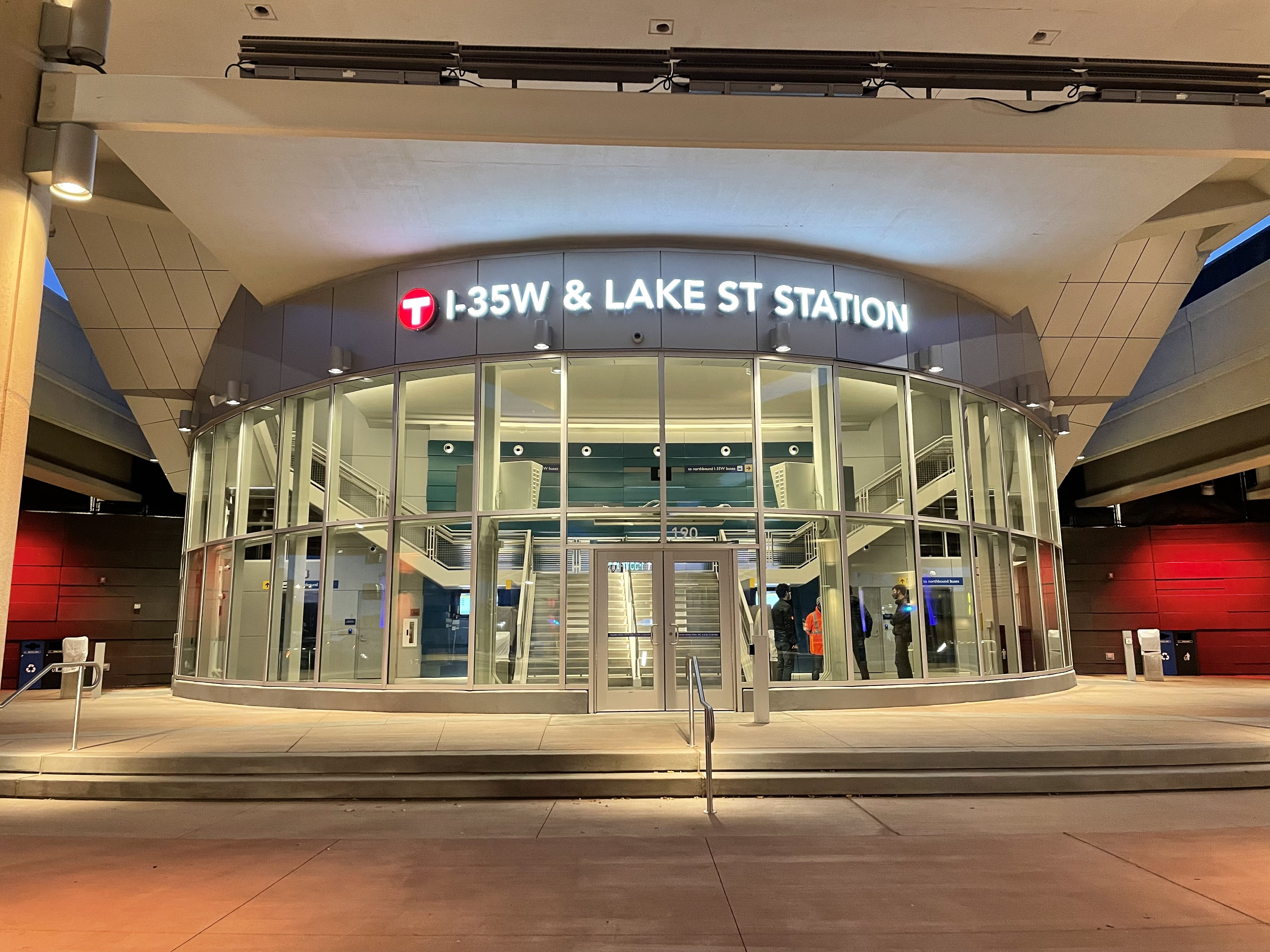
One of two entrances to the Lake St. station on the lower level

Preliminary designs of the stations were completed by November 2016. All stations are ADA accessible and include higher curbs to facilitate easier boarding to a bus. While the stations do not have completely level boarding, the higher platforms reduces the gap compared to typical bus stops. Amenities at the stations would include bike parking, benches, real-time bus arrival information, heating, trash and recycling bins, a station marker, and an information kiosk. The designs call for energy-efficient LED lighting to be used at each station. New sidewalks were added in some locations, to better connect the stations to the surrounding neighborhoods.

Station		Neighborhood(s)	City	Opened	Connections	Weekday Ridership
Marquette & 3rd Street	2nd Avenue & Washington	Downtown West	Minneapolis	December 5, 2009 (transit facilities); December 4, 2021 (Orange Line)	Many downtown routes	171
Marquette & 5th Street	2nd Avenue & 5th Street	Downtown West	Minneapolis	December 5, 2009 (transit facilities); December 4, 2021 (Orange Line)	Many downtown routes, Metro Blue Line, Green Line	97
Marquette & 7th Street	2nd Avenue & 7th Street	Downtown West	Minneapolis	December 5, 2009 (transit facilities); December 4, 2021 (Orange Line)	Many downtown routes, short walk to Metro C Line	306
Marquette & 11th Street	2nd Avenue & 11th Street	Downtown West	Minneapolis	December 5, 2009 (transit facilities); December 4, 2021 (Orange Line)	Many downtown routes	163
I-35W & Lake Street		Central, Phillips West, Lyndale, Whittier	Minneapolis	October 21, 2021 (station); December 4, 2021 (Orange Line)	Routes B Line, 27, 460, 464, 465, 470, 472, 475, 477, 479, 578, 579, 600, 695	352
I-35W & 46th Street		Field, King Field, Regina, Tangletown	Minneapolis	December 4, 2010 (station); December 4, 2021 (Orange Line)	Routes 11, 46, 578, 579	171
I-35W & 66th Street		Richfield		December 4, 2021	Route 515	157
Knox & 76th Street		Richfield		December 4, 2021	Route 540	183
Knox & American Boulevard		Bloomington		December 4, 2021	Routes 4, 534, 538, 542	174
I-35W & 98th Street		Bloomington		December 4, 2021	Routes 18, 465, 534, 539, 546, 547	296
I-35W & Burnsville Parkway (Note: Nouthbound service only)		Heart of the City	Burnsville	December 4, 2021	Route 444	31
Burnsville Heart of the City		Heart of the City	Burnsville	December 4, 2021	Routes 425. Routes 444, 460, 465, 495 a short walk at Burnsville Transit Station.	254
