= SouthWest Transit =

Public transportation agency in Minnesota, US

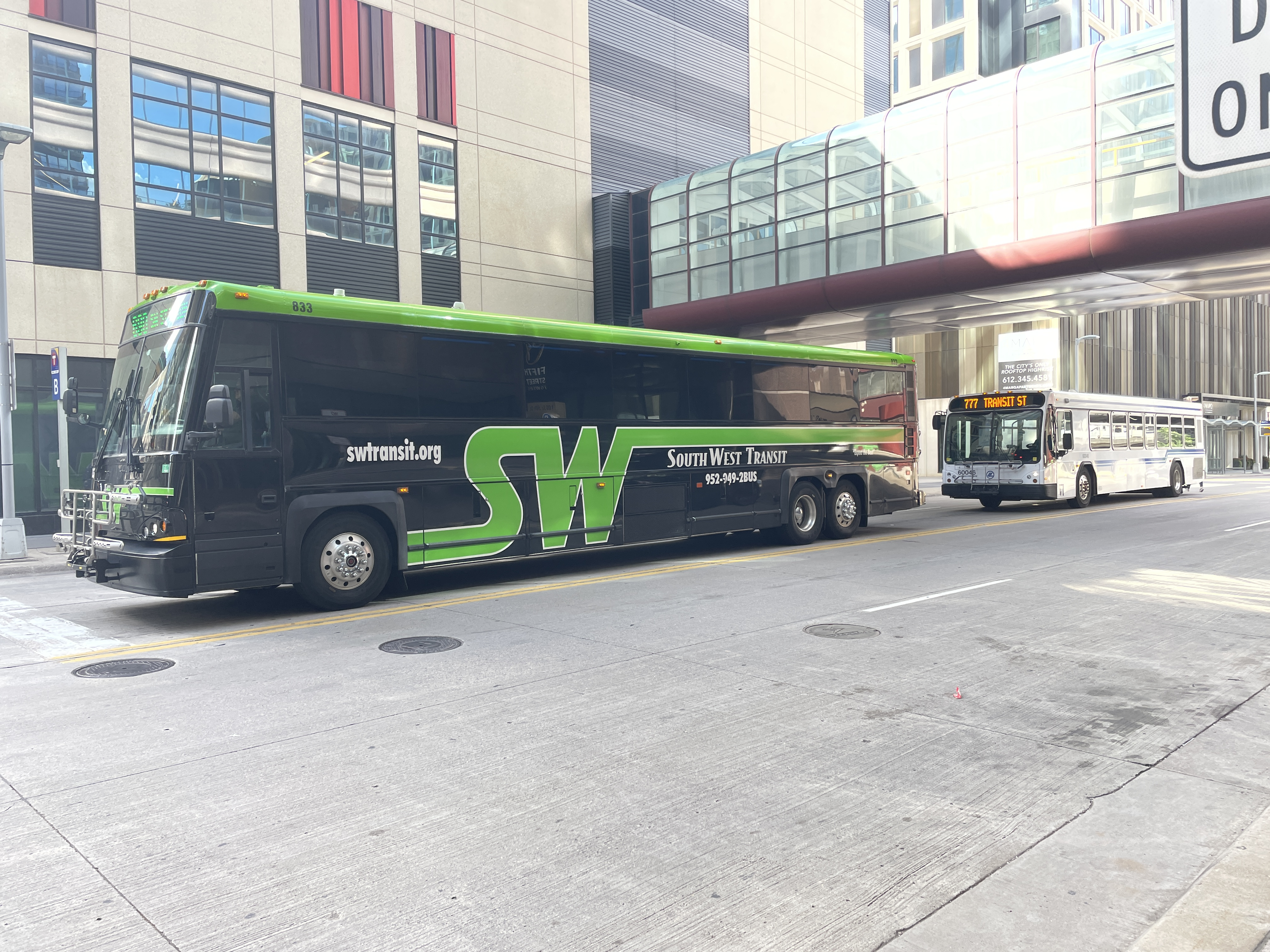
- SouthWest Transit bus at Marquette Ave and 5th St on the Marq2 transit corridor
- Headquarters: 14405 W 62nd St, Eden Prairie, Minnesota
- Service type: bus service, paratransit
- Destinations: Eden Prairie, Chanhassen, Chaska, Minneapolis, University of Minnesota
- Daily ridership: 1,400 (weekdays, Q2 2026)
- Annual ridership: 537,300 (2025)
- Website: swtransit.org

SouthWest Transit is a public transportation agency that is based in Eden Prairie, Minnesota. The agency was formed in 1986 when the southwest Minneapolis suburbs of Chaska, Chanhassen, and Eden Prairie chose to opt out of the Metropolitan Transit Commission transit system in accordance with Minnesota State Statutes. Under a joint powers agreement between the three cities, they created their own transit system, SouthWest Metro Transit. In 2025, the system had a ridership of 537,300, or about 1,400 per weekday as of the second quarter of 2026.

Now known as SouthWest Transit, the agency continues to be the public transit agency for Chaska, Chanhassen, and Eden Prairie, as well as Carver and Victoria. It currently offers fixed route service to and from the southwest Minneapolis suburbs, downtown Minneapolis, the University of Minnesota. In addition to fixed route services, SouthWest Transit offers microtransit services (SouthWest Prime) for communities in its service area, as well as special event services to events around the Twin Cities such as sports games, concerts, the state fair, and other highly attended events.

== Service ==
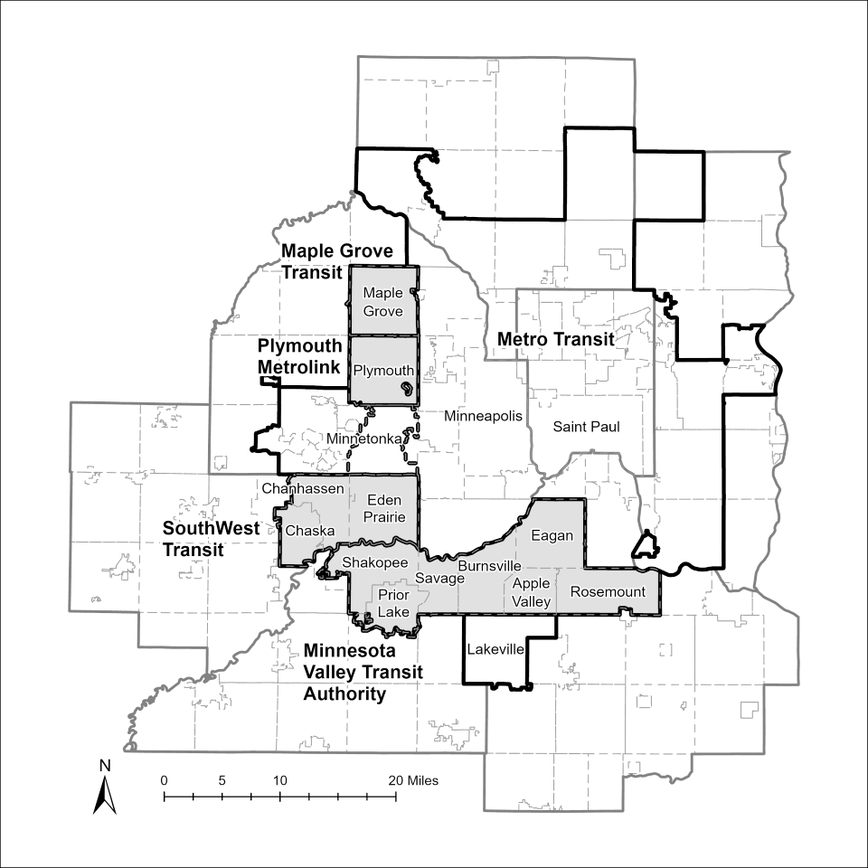
Southwest Transit serves Chaska, Chanhassen, and Eden Prairie in the southwest area of the Twin Cities metropolitan area.

In addition to their regular service, SouthWest Transit also offers a number of seasonal services, including State Fair, Twins Express, Vikings Express, Gophers Express, Summer Adventures, select concerts, and more.

In 2004 SouthWest Transit was named Transit Agency of the Year by the American Public Transit Association.

During the COVID-19 pandemic, SouthWest Transit initially laid off 50% of its drivers but has since struggled to re-staff its workforce like transit agencies across the nation.

=== Southwest Prime ===
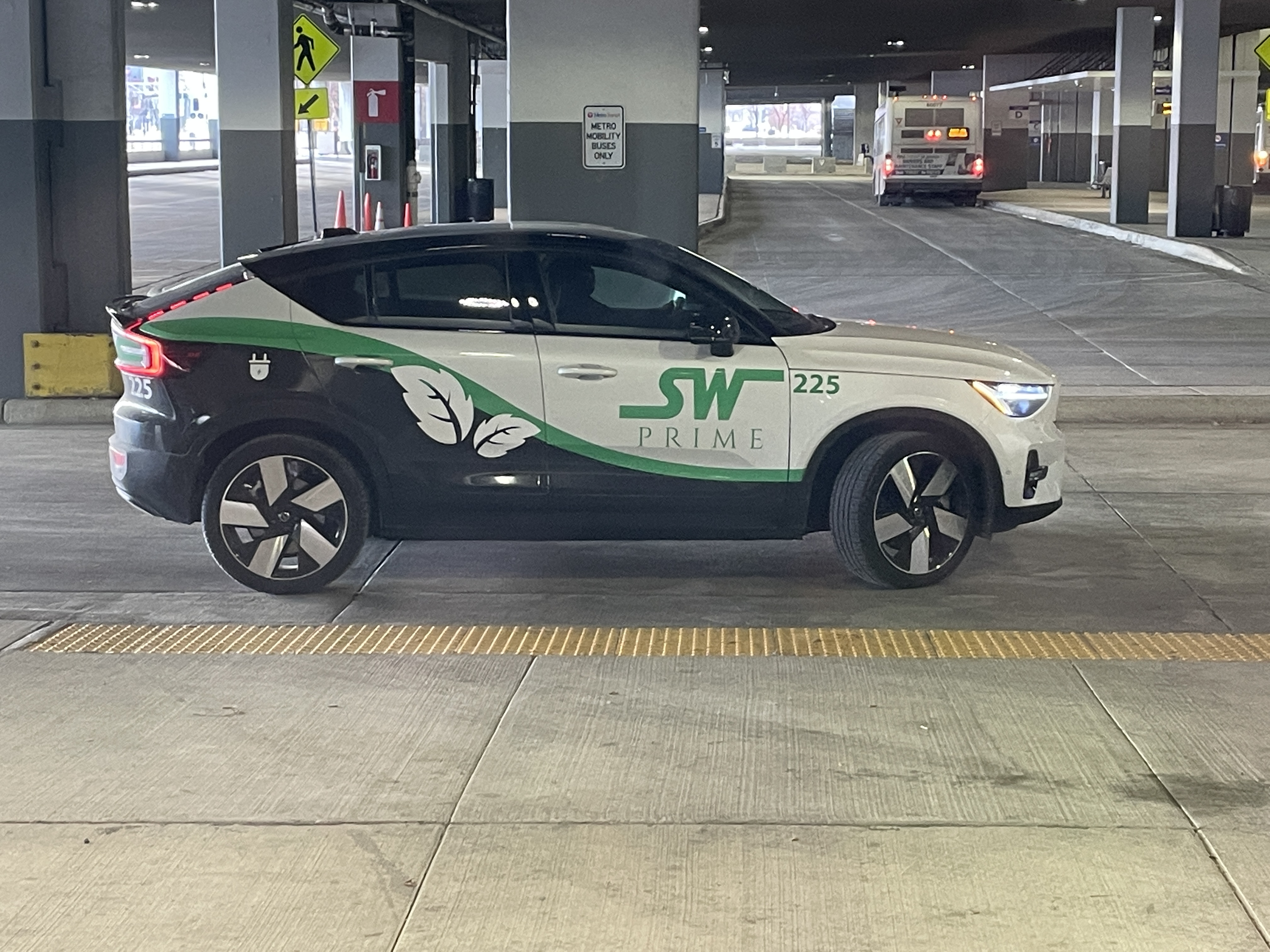
SouthWest Prime electric vehicle at Mall of America station

SouthWest Transit also operates a microtransit service, SW Prime. This service operates in the cities of Carver, Chanhassen, Chaska, Eden Prairie, and Victoria. Other regional transit providers provide similar services with the Metropolitan Council's Transit Link, Maple Grove Transit's My Ride, MVTA's Connect, Plymouth Metrolink's Click-And-Ride, and Metro Transit's microtransit pilot Metro Transit micro. SW Prime was the first microtransit service to launch in the Twin Cities. The service accepts the region's low-income fare program. Drivers of the service belong to a union.

SouthWest Transit offered a dial-a-ride transit service in the 1990s that required riders to book a trip by phone several days in advance. The service had high rates of trip cancellations and customers no-showing. SW Prime was launched in July 2015 and allowed customers to book a ride by phone or via a smartphone app. The service was initially offered Monday through Friday, but it has since expanded to Saturdays as well. The service was expanded to medical rides in 2019. Some service is offered to select areas of Shakopee and I-494 strip. Prior to the COVID-19 pandemic, around 500 SW Prime rides were served a day. Ridership lowered during the pandemic and in January 2021 was roughly 50% of pre-pandemic ridership, but by June 2022 ridership was 94% of pre-pandemic numbers. SW Prime ridership rebounded faster than SouthWest Transit express ridership. Ridership in August 2023 was higher than pre-pandemic ridership in 2019. In 2024, Southwest Transit planned to replace the Prime service along the I-494 corridor to the Mall of America with a fixed-route service which will help reduce costs.

On March 31 2025, SouthWest Transit began operating route 686 to replace SW Prime Airport service. This bus utilizes I-494 for express service and American Blvd for local service. Both local and express service stop at the Mall of America and Minneapolis-Saint Paul International Airport Terminal 1 and 2. SW Prime Airport service is planned to shut down on April 26, 2025, with the remainder of SW Prime service unaffected.

== Routes ==
Bold route number denotes an express route.

Route	Origin/Destination		Major Destinations/Transit Stations	Notes	Link
686	SW Station	Minneapolis-Saint Paul International Airport Terminal 2	Transit stations: SouthWest Station, Mall of America, MSP Airport Terminal 1 & 2	Express service, denoted "X", only stops at SW Station, Mall of America, MSP Terminal 1, and MSP Terminal 2. Local service, denoted "L", travels along American Blvd to reach the same destinations.	link
695	East Creek	Downtown Minneapolis, University of MN	Transit Stations: East Creek Station, SouthWest Village, SouthWest Station; Downtown Minneapolis: Wells Fargo; University of Minnesota		link
698	698: East Creek	Downtown Minneapolis, University of MN	Transit Stations: Carver Station, East Creek Station, SouthWest Village, Chanhassen Station, Southwest Station; Downtown Minneapolis: 2nd Avenue Stop F, Marquette Avenue Stop D; University of Minnesota	The 698L Stops at East Creek or Carver Station if requested.	link

== Park & Ride Facilities ==
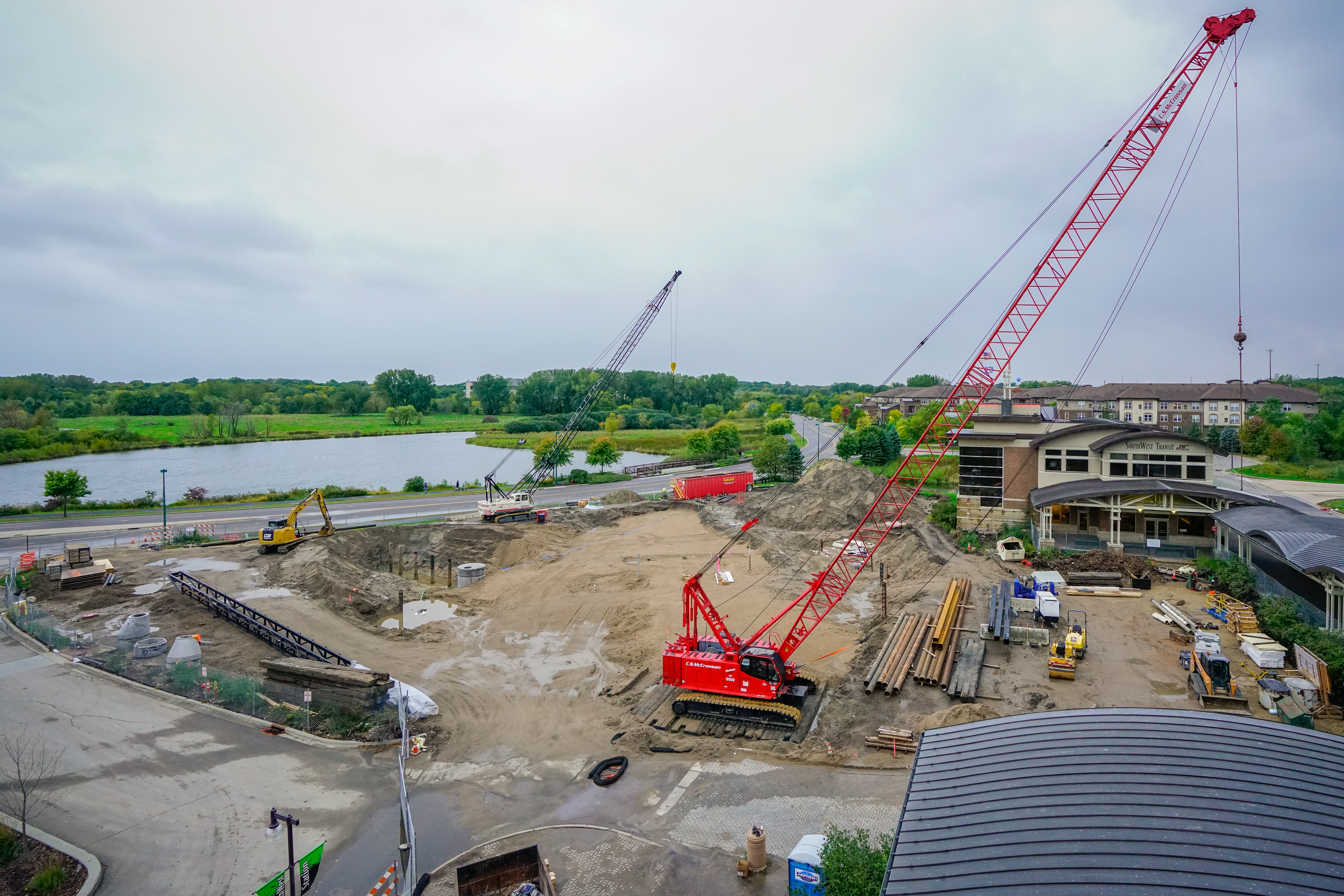
SouthWest Station in Eden Prairie under construction in anticipation of the Metro Green Line Extension

SouthWest Transit operates out of the following park-and-ride locations:

- Southwest Station – Hwy 212 & Prairie Center Drive, Eden Prairie
- SouthWest Village – Hwy 212 & Hwy 101, Chanhassen
- Chanhassen Transit Station – 500 Market St., Chanhassen (currently not providing regular service)
- East Creek Station – Hwy 212 & Hwy 41, Chaska
- Carver Station – Hwy 212 & Jonathan Carver Pkwy, Carver (owned by the City of Carver)

=== Park and ride expansions ===
SouthWest Transit opened three new park & ride facilities near Highway 212. The first, SouthWest Village, is at County Road 101 and Highway 212 in Chanhassen. The second new park & ride is East Creek Station in Chaska. That facility was opened in early June 2008 at the southwest corner of Highway 212 and County Road 41. The third new park & ride is Chanhassen Transit Station opened in December 2011 and is located north of Highway 5, just next to the Chanhassen Dinner Theatres on Market St.

Due to near capacity issues, in 2007 the East Creek Station Park and Ride CMAQ (Congestion Mitigation and Air Quality – a federal program) grant submittal was approved for the construction of 450 park and ride stalls, a transit station and busway. The new 450 stalls are structured parking (a ramp), and the station includes passenger waiting areas along with vending and restroom facilities. The total project cost $7.8 million. Bidding for the construction of the ramp and station is expected to take place in the spring/summer of 2012, with construction beginning later in the summer/fall and an opening of the new facility in September 2013. SouthWest is also in discussion with private developers to develop approximately one acre of land currently set aside for future development use. Options for the site include office, neighborhood commercial, and day care.

== Records ==
Records of the SouthWest Transit Commission are available for research use. They consist of annual reports (1997–2005); management plans and budgets (1992–1993, 1995); oversight (1993–1994); and On the Move rider newsletter (2005).

== Ridership ==
The ridership statistics shown here are of fixed route services only and do not include demand response services.

== See also ==
- Metro Transit (Minnesota)
- Minnesota Valley Transit Authority
- List of bus transit systems in the United States
