= Plymouth Metrolink =

Public transit system in Minnesota, U.S.

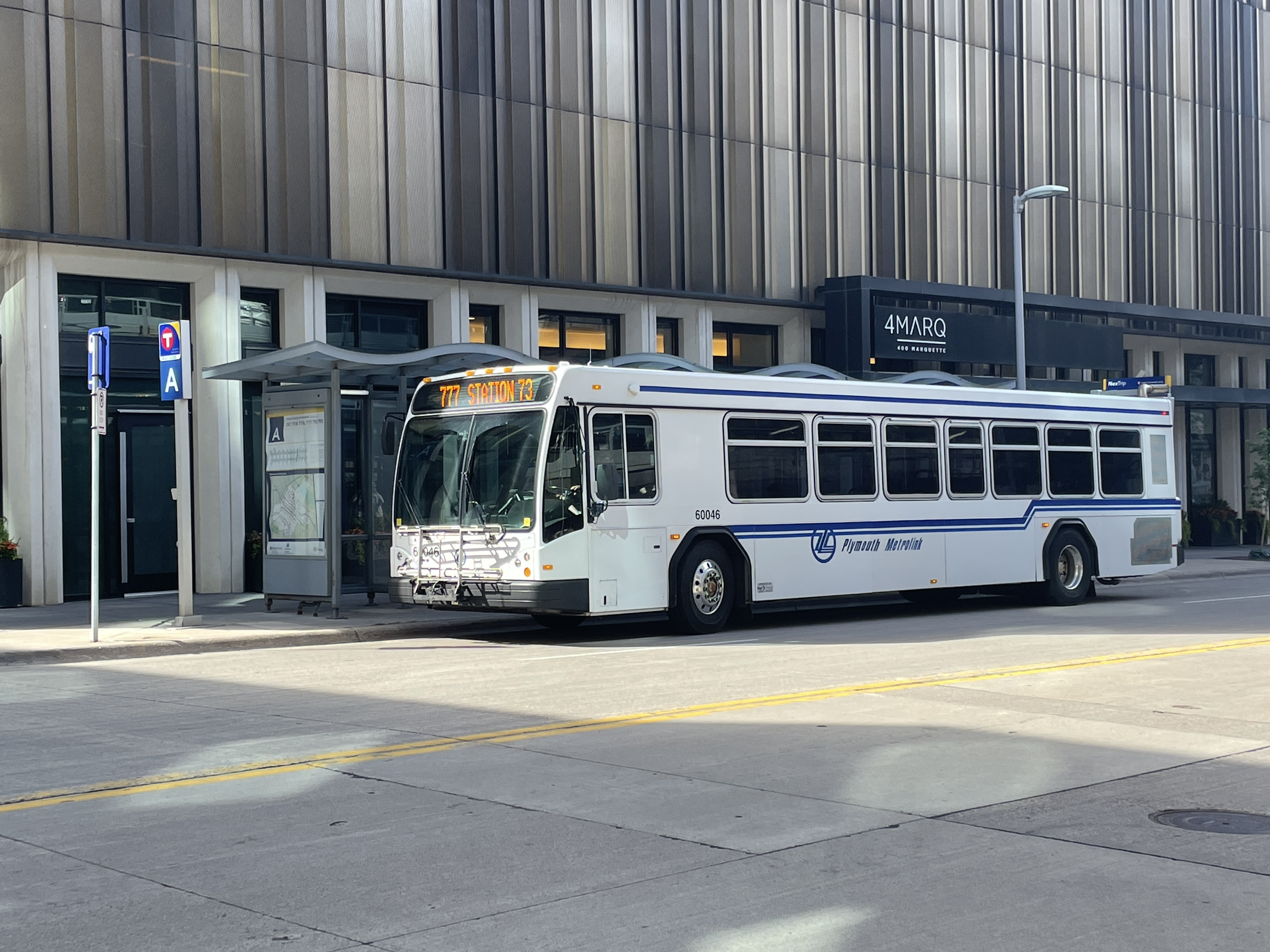
- Plymouth Metrolink bus on the Marq2 transit corridor in Downtown Minneapolis
- Founded: 1983
- Service type: Bus service
- Routes: 14
- Stations: Station 73 Park & Ride
- Daily ridership: 1,800 (Q3 2012)
- Operator: First Transit
- Website: www.plymouthmn.gov/departments/administrative-services-/transit

Plymouth Metrolink is the public transit system that serves Plymouth, Minnesota. Metrolink operates fixed-route bus routes Monday-Friday during peak periods with limited midday service. Most routes serve downtown Minneapolis and the University of Minnesota with one route providing reverse commute service from Minneapolis to employers in Plymouth. Demand-responsive bus service is available seven days a week. Most buses are provided by the Metropolitan Council with First Transit operating the fixed-route service.

Prior to 1983, transit service in Plymouth was available from the privately operated but state-subsidized Medicine Lake Lines. Plymouth residents paid property taxes to support the Metropolitan Transit Commission (MTC) but received no transit service from MTC in return. A state law passed in 1981 allowed select cities to "opt-out" from contributing their full share of taxes to the MTC in exchange for providing their own transit service. Plymouth was the first city to opt-out and began managing their own transit service in 1983.

== History and origin ==
Residents of the city of Plymouth paid $770,000 in property taxes to the Metropolitan Transit Commission (MTC) in 1981 but did not receive bus service in return. MTC did not operate in Plymouth due to the presence of privately-operated but state-subsidized bus service from Medicine Lake Lines. A state law passed in 1981 allowed cities to "opt out" of contributing funds to the MTC provided they met two criteria. The cities could not have any service or only have routes that terminate in the community, and the community must have fewer than four trips during the off peak hours. Plymouth began investigating opting out in 1982 and considered partnering with the city of Maple Grove to provide transit service. While city staff hoped that the new legislation could improve bus service for the city, they were concerned about staff time needed to administer a separate bus program.

=== Proposal to opt-out ===
The city began discussing opting out with MTC, state highway department, and Medicine Lake Lines later in 1982 and internally proposed diverting $250,000 in property taxes from MTC towards transit service in Plymouth. In exchange for giving $250,000 to Plymouth to spend on bus service within the community, the city proposed to MTC that it would drop its request to withdraw from the MTC system and take with it all of the allowed property taxes currently dedicated to MTC. The city council approved plans to request withdrawing from MTC and work with Medicine Lake Lines to serve the city with feeder vans that took riders to a central location before boarding buses to Minneapolis in December 1982. The official application to opt-out was submitted in January 1983. In addition to the 25-passenger feeder bus vans, reverse commute service was proposed. An estimated 15 percent of existing riders to Plymouth were reverse commuters coming from Minneapolis and nearby suburbs. A midday feeder van would circulate through the city between peak periods. The pulse meeting point was Highway 55 and County Road 73.

For Plymouth to successfully withdraw from the MTC system, MnDOT and the Metropolitan Council were required to approve the proposal. MTC submitted a letter opposing the withdrawal based on expected losses of property tax revenue would actually be closer to $900,000 the first year instead of an estimated $277,000, and that the subsidy for Plymouth's system would cost more per rider which was not allowed under the state law granting cities the option to opt out of their system. While MTC interpreted the state law to only allow Plymouth to divert property taxes required to fund their own transit system and the remaining money would stay with the MTC, Plymouth's interpretation allowed the city to contribute only 10% of the previously collected funds for MTC and keep 90% of property tax revenue for refunds to Plymouth residents or other transportation projects. The Minnesota state attorney general agreed with Plymouth's interpretation based on a levy provision which was added to another section of the law. The author of the law, Carolyn Rodriguez, agreed with MTC that the provision to refund up to 90% of funds previously dedicated to MTC to local residents was not the intent of the law and that it should be repealed.

=== Approval and opening ===
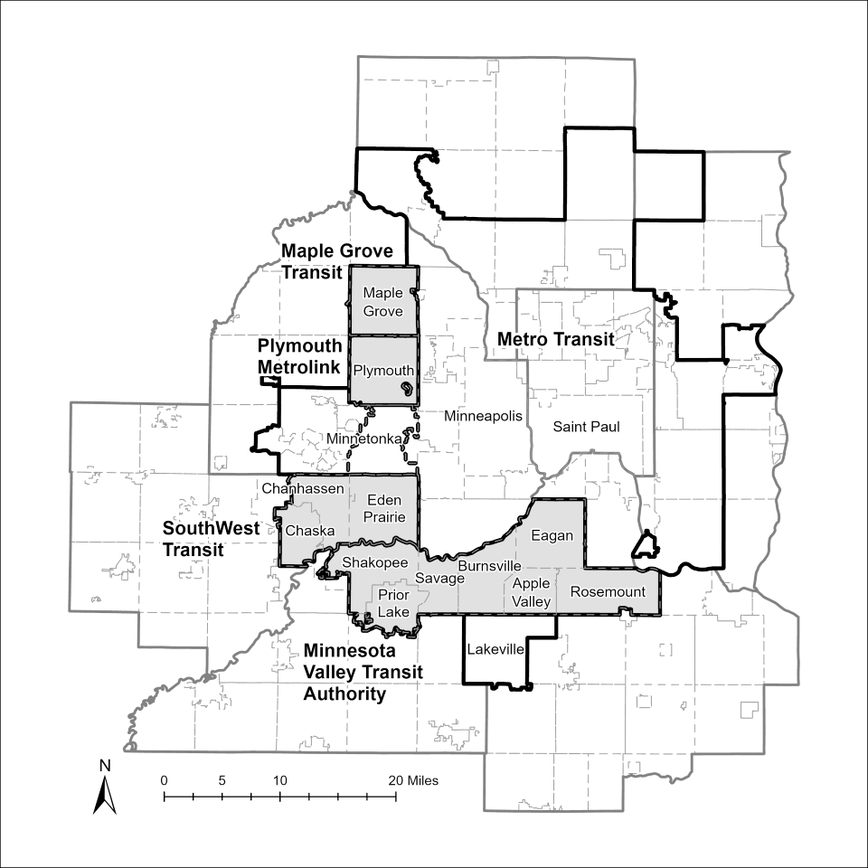
The location of Plymouth Metrolink's service area in relation to other opt-out providers in the Twin Cities

Plymouth's proposal was approved for an 18-month period in May 1983 with the agreement to withdraw only $277,000 of around $1 million in generated in property taxes by the city, rather than a full 90%. An initial 40-car parking lot was created and 125 bus stop signs were placed before the start of service on October 3, 1983. Ridership after the first week was promising with an average of 290 rides per weekday which was above the 250 ride baseline of existing Medicine Lake bus service. After the first year, ridership averaged 295 rides a weekday with January being the highest average month with 330 rides a weekday.

In response to the creation of Plymouth Metrolink, MTC reduced the property tax rate for 20 cities who were eligible to opt-out of the MTC system but had not yet done so to discourage them from opting out. After Medicine Lake Bus Company entered bankruptcy protection in 1990, MTC began operating several Plymouth Metrolink bus routes while another company operating the mini-coaches that shuttled riders to the central park and ride location at TH 55 and County Road 73. The contract length was for one year.

A citizens advisory committee met quarterly to advise the city on transit issues from 1984 to 2015.

=== Developments since 2014 ===
The city of Plymouth decided to contract with SouthWest Transit in December 2014 to manage Plymouth Metrolink. Technology innovations released in 2015 included release of a phone application to distribute transit information allow riders to track buses and the addition of public WiFi for customers on the fleet of 32 express buses which was done with help from a partnership with SouthWest Transit.

After TCF Financial Corporation moved employees from downtown Minneapolis to Plymouth, Metrolink created a new bus route with three daily trips to serve workers at the corporate campus in 2015. By the end of 2016, SouthWest Transit's contract expired and Plymouth Metrolink was no longer managed by SouthWest Transit.

At the start of the COVID-19 pandemic in March 2020, Plymouth Metrolink reduced operations and only operated 6 of 13 routes. Capacity for express buses was limited to 10 passengers and on-demand service to 1 passenger in a vehicle. For a time, fare collection was suspended and riders were directed to enter the rear door. Fare collection and front door boarding resumed in August 2020. In October 2020 Plymouth Metrolink spent $11,000 to install air purifiers on all of its buses. The air purifiers were designed to remove airborne viruses and protect passengers and bus drivers. Capacity on buses was increased capacity to 50 percent in April 2021 and restrictions were removed in May 2021.

== Funding ==
Plymouth Metrolink was funded primarily by property taxes when it was first created. Up to 90% of property taxes previously dedicated to metropolitan transit operations through MTC could be diverted to fund service in Plymouth. Property taxes to fund transit were eliminated in the 2001 Minnesota legislative session and replaced with 20.5% of motor vehicle sales taxes. A state constitutional amendment to dedicated the motor vehicle sales tax (MVST) revenue to transportation purposes, including a portion to transit, was passed in 2006 by a vote of Minnesota voters. A sales tax of 6.5 percent is levied on motor vehicle sales in Minnesota. Funding for transit is guaranteed 40 percent of MVST revenue with 36 percent dedicated to Twin Cities metropolitan area transit. Plymouth receives a percentage of those funds defined by a relationship related to property values in 2006 and 2001.

Plymouth Metrolink's total budget in 2017 was $4.5 million with $3.27 spent on fixed route service and $1.23 million spent on dial-a-ride service. Metrolink's commuter and express network had a subsidy per ride of $4.70 and carried 18.4 passengers per in-service hour compared to $4.11 and 34.7 passengers per in-service hour for Metro Transit, the main transit provider within the Twin Cities. The subsidy was greater than Maple Grove Transit, which contracts with Metro Transit to provide service, at $3.08 per ride but less than SouthWest Transit or Minnesota Valley Transit Authority which had subsidies of $6.80 and $6.50 per ride respectively. The overall farebox recovery ratio was 23.4 percent which is greater than MVTA and service directly operated by Metro Transit, but less than SouthWest Transit and Maple Grove Transit.

== Service ==
As of May 2022, six weekday bus routes are offered along with a seven days a week demand-responsive shuttle. Four bus routes travel into downtown Minneapolis on weekday morning with one continuing on the University of Minnesota campus. On weekday afternoons, five bus routes return from Minneapolis to Plymouth. A reverse commute route serving riders traveling from downtown Minneapolis to businesses in Plymouth operates weekdays as well. Buses serving downtown Minneapolis utilize the Marq2 transit corridor which has two bus only lanes and assigned bus stop gates to speed up buses through downtown. All routes travel on Interstate 394 which has two-lane reversible high-occupancy toll lanes as part of E-ZPass Minnesota.

Plymouth's flagship park and ride facility, Station 73 opened in 2006. As of 2021 it has capacity for 288 cars. The majority of trips that Plymouth Metrolink offers serve Station 73 at TH 55 and County Road 73. In addition, there are 3 other park and ride facilities within Plymouth.

The demand-responsive bus serve is branded as Plymouth Metrolink Click-and-Ride. Rides can be reserved through a smartphone application or by calling a telephone number. Trips can go anywhere within the city of Plymouth as well as a few destinations outside Plymouth, but nearby. ADA dial-a-ride service is available through Metro Mobility and general public dial-a-ride service to areas outside of the fixed-route network are available with Transit Link which are both provided by the Metropolitan Council.

Plymouth Metrolink served 517,921 rides from 37,196 in-service hours in 2017, making it the smallest transit system by ridership and second smallest by in-service hours offered in the Twin Cities.

== Ridership ==
The ridership statistics shown here are of fixed route services only and do not include demand response services.

== See also ==
- List of bus transit systems in the United States
- Metro Transit (Minnesota)
