= Kenrick Avenue Park and Ride station =

Parking facility in Lakeville, Minnesota

Kenrick Avenue Park & Ride
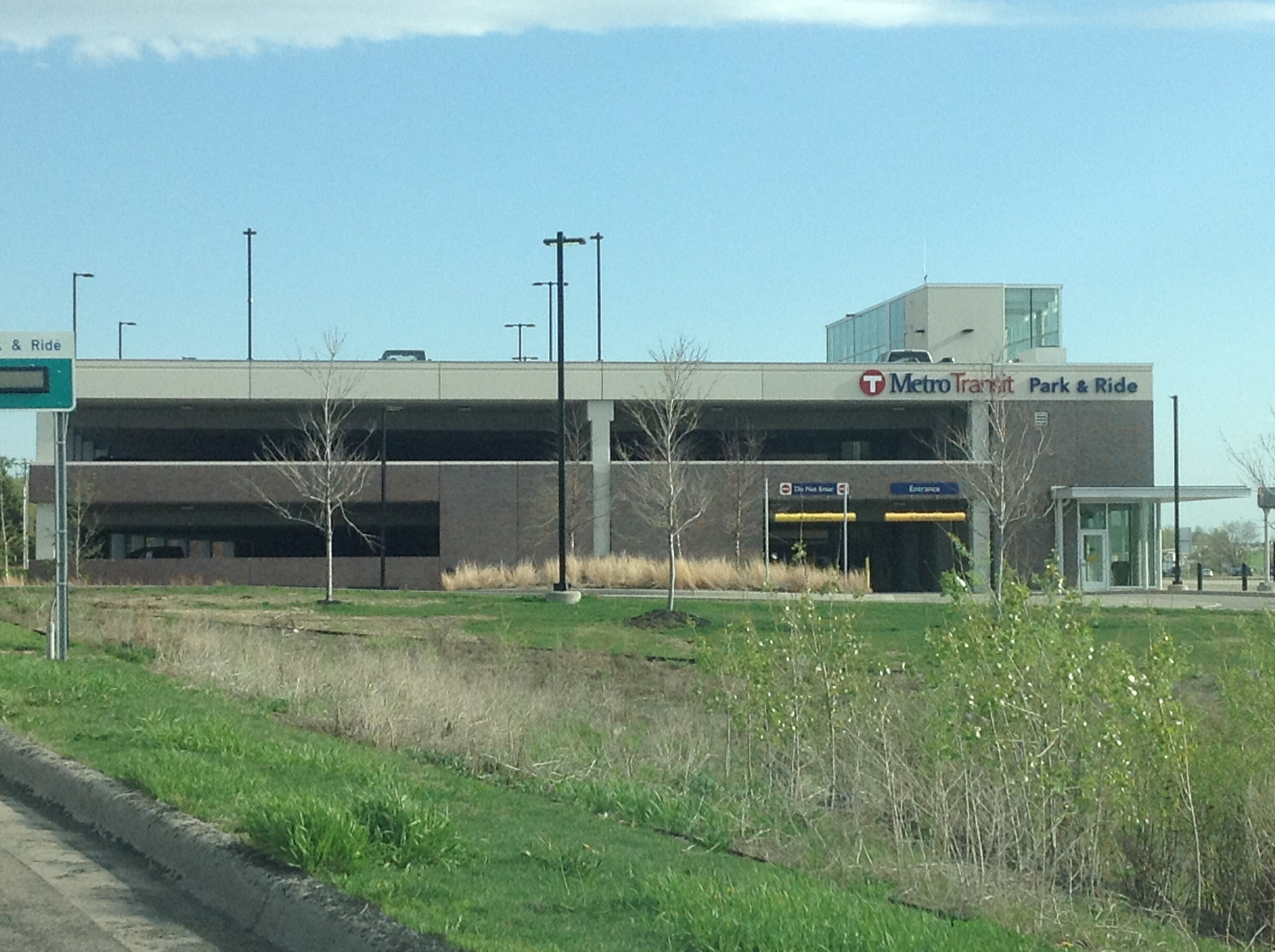

General information
- Coordinates: 44°42′24″N 93°17′04″W
- Owner: Metro Transit
- Connections: 467

Construction
- Accessible: Yes

History
- Opened: September 28, 2009
Location

The Kenrick Avenue Park and Ride is a 750-space parking ramp in Lakeville, Minnesota providing interchange for bus passengers.

The three-level park-and-ride ramp is located on the site of a former Minnesota Department of Transportation weigh station, on the east side of Interstate Highway 35 at Kenrick Avenue and 167th Street West, about two miles south of the point where I-35E and I-35W divide. In January, 2009, the Metropolitan Council awarded a $6.6 million contract to Adolphson & Peterson Construction to build the station, which began serving customers on September 28, 2009.

Northbound buses access the freeway directly from the station. Buses on Metro Transit's Express Bus Route 467 now serve commuters destined for downtown Minneapolis. A future extension of the Metro Orange Line, a bus rapid transit service to downtown Minneapolis, may also serve the facility.

The station was built at a cost of $8.67 million. Most of the cost was paid by the federal government with $1.7 million coming from Minnesota state bonds. The park and ride was the third largest facility by capacity in the Metro Transit system in 2011.
