= Urban Partnership Agreement =

The Urban Partnership Agreement (UPA) is an effort of the United States Department of Transportation and agencies in four metropolitan areas across the country which are testing out several technologies as an effort to reduce congestion in urban areas. The metro areas of Miami, Florida, Minneapolis, Minnesota, San Francisco, California, and Seattle, Washington are participants. The technologies being used include bus rapid transit (BRT), high-occupancy toll lane (HOT) lanes and other congestion pricing, dynamic message signs, and other lane management signage.

The federal Department of Transportation sent out requests for cities willing to participate in December 2006. The cities with the most aggressive plans to mitigate congestion were to be selected. Five participants were announced in August 2007, which included the regions listed above as well as New York City, but New York eventually failed to meet the terms of the agreement they had struck, and was removed from the program.

The UPA is focused on using what it calls "the 4Ts" to reduce traffic congestion: tolling, transit, telecommuting, and technology.

== Projects ==
=== Miami ===
In Miami, the primary UPA project is the "95 Express" program, which added high-occupancy toll lanes to Interstate 95 that can be used by registered carpools, hybrid cars, and buses, in addition to toll-paying customers using SunPass. Ramp metering was also installed.

=== Minneapolis ===
The UPA projects in Minneapolis extend from the city's central business district south along Interstate 35W. In downtown, a project rebuilt Marquette Avenue South and Second Avenue South into the Marq2 transit corridor with two-lane busways and a system using lettered gates to allow express buses to flow through the downtown region more quickly. Gates on Marquette Avenue are lettered A, B, C, and D, while gate letters E, F, G, and H are used along Second Avenue. "NexTrip" real-time LED message signs indicating bus arrival times are also installed at each gate. Marq2 began operation in December 2009.

Other UPA projects in the region were largely related to building the I-35W Bus Rapid Transitway. This included several stops and park and ride facilities. I-35W also includes HOT lanes which use the MnPASS system. The other lanes of I-35W also received dynamic active traffic management signage which gives suggested speed limits which attempt to calm the flow of congested traffic.

=== San Francisco ===
Projects in San Francisco include "SFpark", a variable-price on-street and off-street parking system, enhanced 5-1-1 service (both via phone and web interface), improvements to ferry services, and a better traffic forecasting system for the Grand and MacArthur BRT projects in Oakland.

=== Seattle ===
The primary project in the Seattle area is related to handling congestion on Washington State Route 520 with tolling. The freeway's floating bridges over Lake Washington need to be replaced, though replacement is not part of the UPA program, and the tolls are one way to generate funds for a replacement span.

The UPA program in Seattle also involved hybrid buses and real-time arrival signage at bus stops as well as improved park-and-ride facilities. Seattle has the largest ferry fleet in the United States. That system was also funded, including improvements to the terminals at Mukilteo and Guemes Island, as well as investments in high-speed, ultra-low wake ferries.
