= Maple Grove Transit =

Public Transit Provider

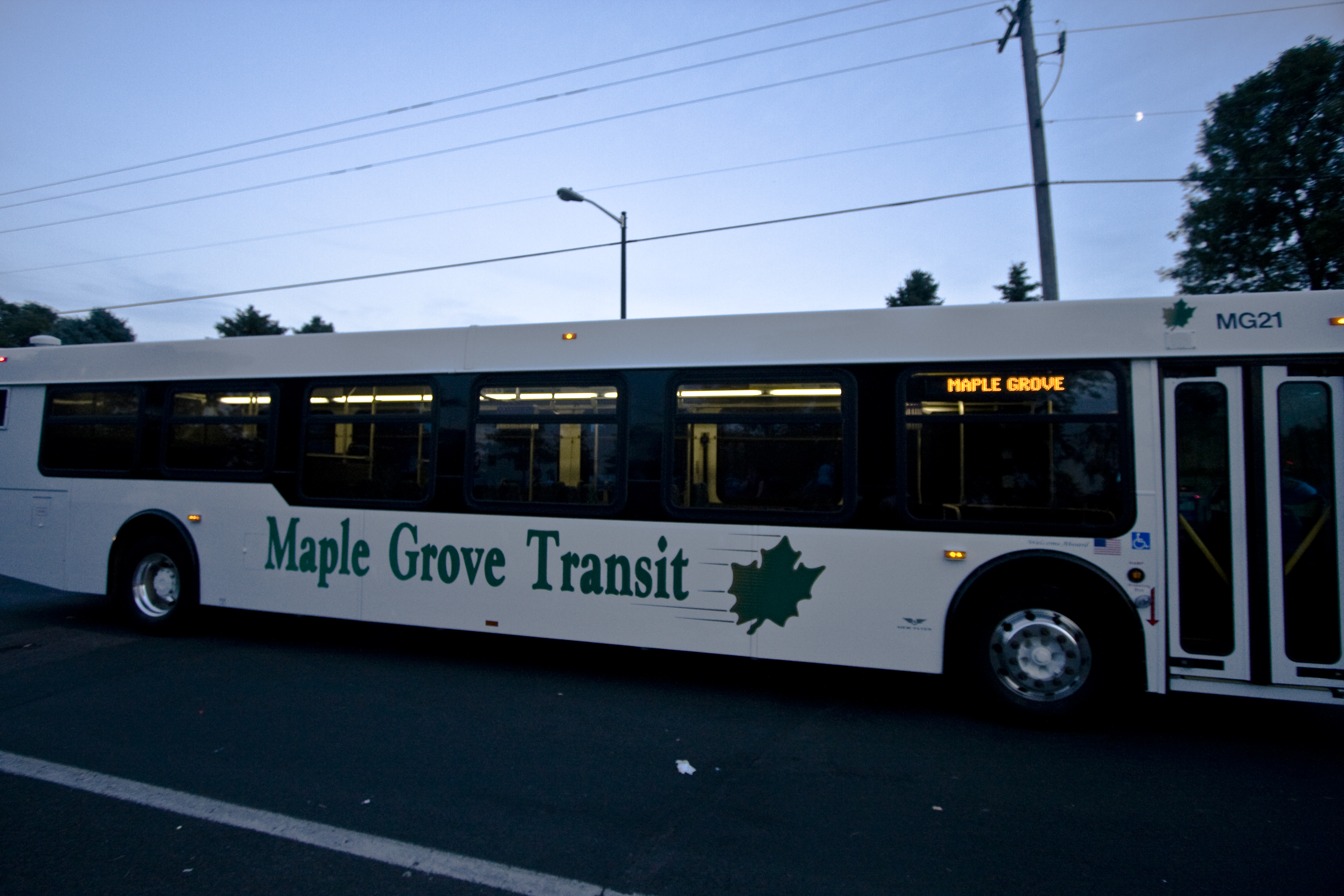
- A Maple Grove Transit bus
- Founded: 1990
- Locale: Maple Grove, MN
- Service type: Commuter bus, Dial-a-Ride
- Routes: 8
- Destinations: Minneapolis
- Fleet: 19 x 45-passenger 9 x 66-passenger 1 x 25-passenger 5 x 15-passenger
- Daily ridership: 2,500
- Operator: Metro Transit and Midwest Paratransit Solutions
- Website: Maple Grove Transit

Maple Grove Transit is a suburban public transit provider in the Minneapolis – Saint Paul metropolitan area of Minnesota serving the city of Maple Grove. The service currently operates 5 express routes from Maple Grove to Downtown Minneapolis in the morning and return from Minneapolis to Maple Grove in the afternoon. An additional express route runs between the municipality and the University of Minnesota. One feeder route with timed transfers also connects with the Downtown express routes. Local flex service is provided by the agency, as well.

Maple Grove Transit is one of several "opt-out" public transit operations in the Twin Cities region which run their own services rather than rely on the area's primary provider, Metro Transit. MGT began operations in June 1990.

== Maple Grove Transit Station ==
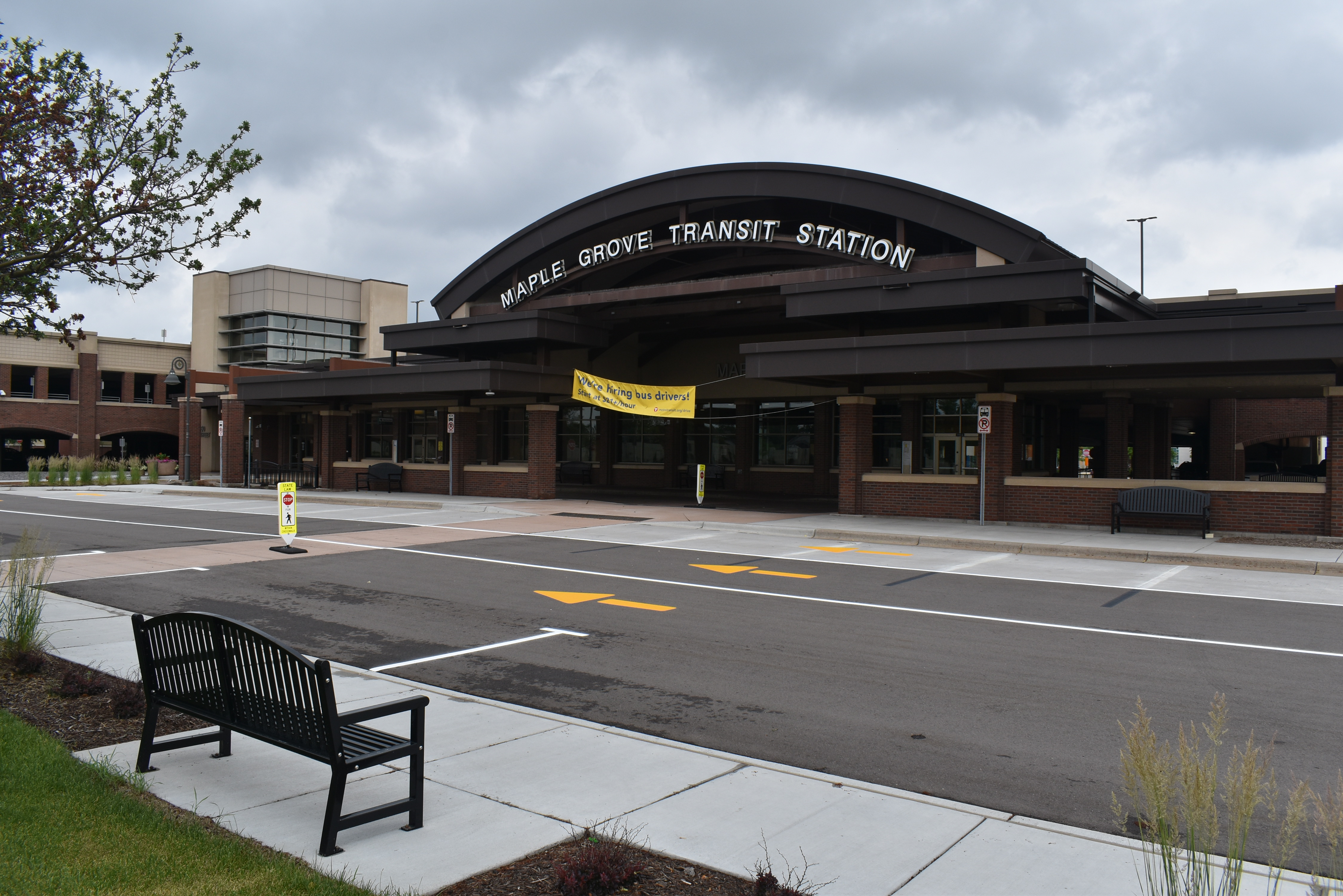
The Maple Grove Transit Station

The Maple Grove Transit Station serves as the primary hub for the Maple Grove Transit System. The station opened for service in December 2003 and contains a 926 stall parking structure, bike lockers and racks and an indoor waiting area with restrooms and a drinking fountain. As of June 2022, the station serves Maple Grove Transit routes 781 and 789, as well as intercity bus services operated by Jefferson Lines.

== Route list ==
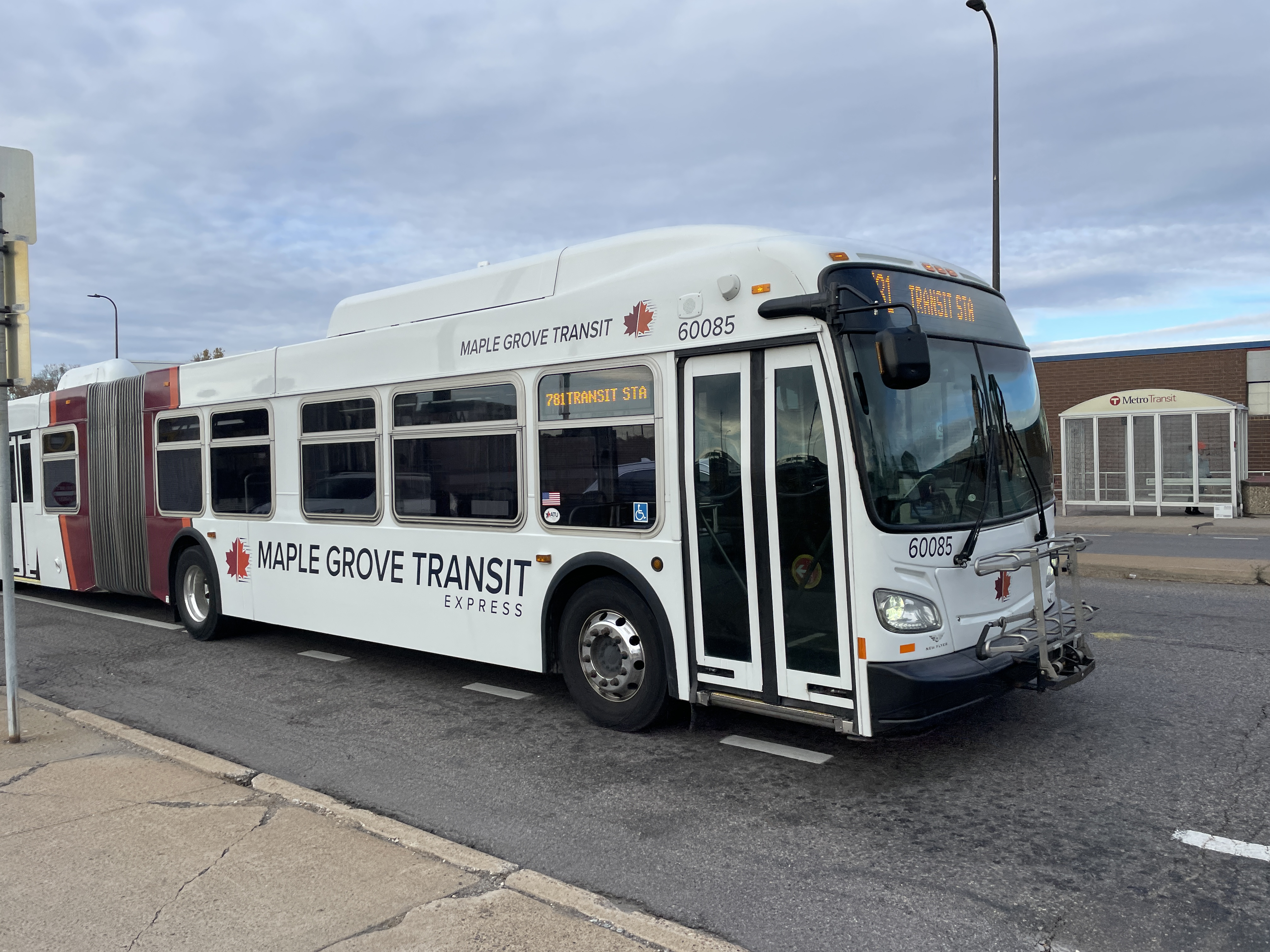
Maple Grove Transit Route 781 bus with new livery as of 2022.

- 780 Shepherd of the Grove Church Park & Ride to Downtown Minneapolis
- 781 Maple Grove Transit Center to Downtown Minneapolis
- 782 Zachary Lane Park & Ride to Downtown Minneapolis
- 783 Crosswinds Church Park & Ride to Downtown Minneapolis
- 785 Parkway Station to Downtown Minneapolis
- 787 Maple Grove Flex Route
- 788 Bass Lake Center to Crosswinds Church Park & Ride
- 789 Maple Grove Transit Center to University of Minnesota

== Ridership ==
The ridership statistics shown here are of fixed route services only and do not include demand response services.

== Fleet ==
As of 2026, the Maple Grove Transit bus fleet consists of the following:

- Gillig BRT 40’
- MCI D4500CT
- New Flyer XD60

All buses are equipped with free Wi-Fi.

== See also ==
- List of bus transit systems in the United States
- Metro Transit (Minnesota)
