= Canadian Pacific Camden Place Rail Bridge =

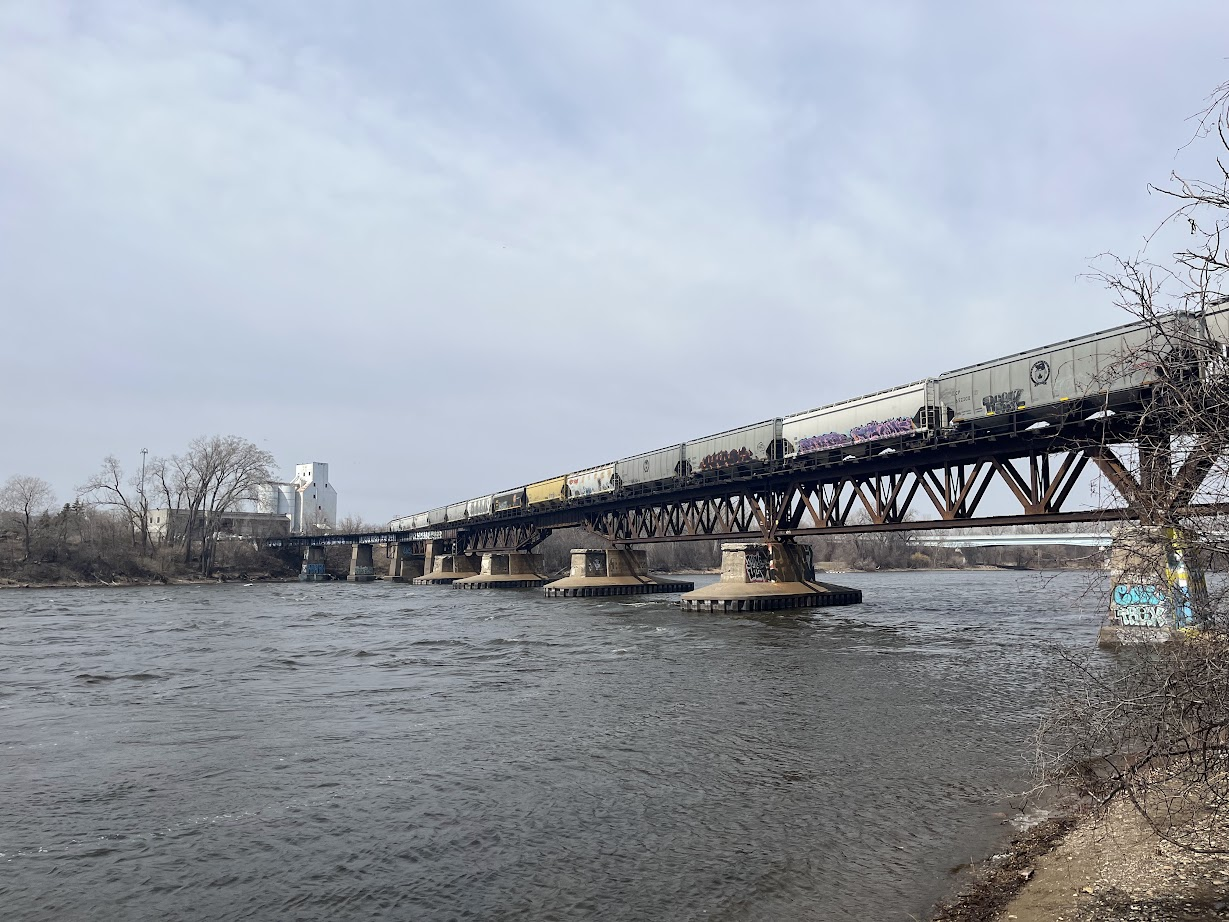
- Camden Place Rail Bridge as viewed from the east bank of the Mississippi River
- Coordinates: 45.029414°N 93.281330°W
- Carries: Canadian Pacific Railway
- Crosses: Mississippi River
- Locale: Minneapolis, Minnesota
- Maintained by: Canadian Pacific Railway
- ID number: D1.00

Characteristics
- Design: Truss bridge; middle span is a suspended girder span
- Total length: 904 feet
- Longest span: 90 feet
- Clearance below: 28 feet

Rail characteristics
- No. of tracks: 1

History
- Opened: 1905

Statistics
- Daily traffic: 16.0 trains per day (as of 2014)

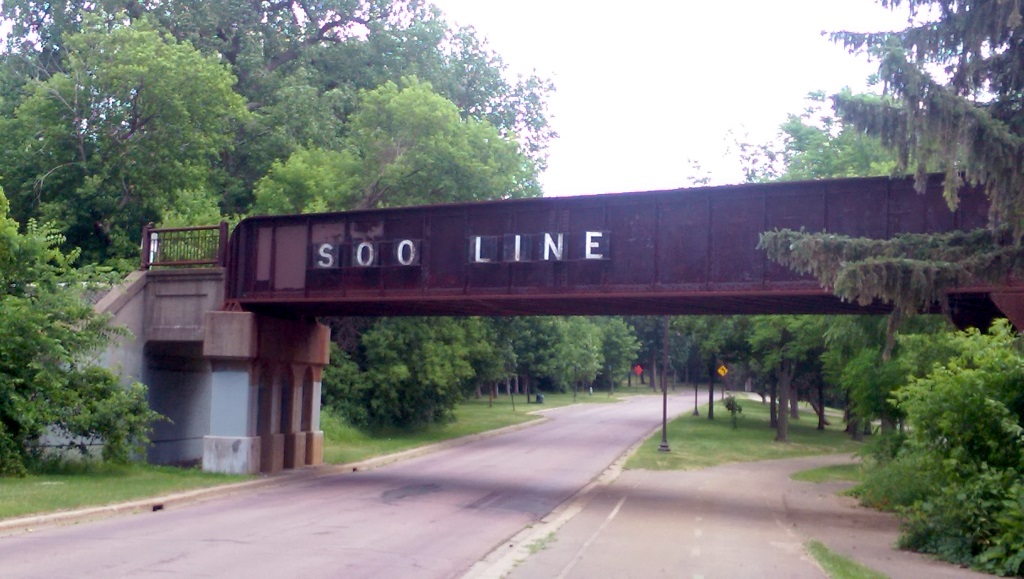
The eastern approach of the bridge over the Saint Anthony Parkway, Minneapolis, MN

Canadian Pacific Camden Place Rail Bridge is a truss bridge that spans the Mississippi River in Minneapolis, Minnesota. This bridge is the official end of the navigable channel for river traffic. It was built in 1905 by the Minneapolis, St. Paul and Sault Ste. Marie Railway. In 1977, the bridge was modified to allow higher clearance under the center span. This was done by replacing the deck truss span with a shallower girder span. It is the main line crossing of the Mississippi River for the Canadian Pacific Railway transcontinental (Soo Line Railroad) line.

The bridge is named for the neighborhood on the western side of the bridge, Camden. Residents of the neighborhood experience long delays due to the Canadian Pacific trains that pass through the area, leading the City of Minneapolis to apply for a Railroad Crossing Elimination grant in 2024 with the Federal Railroad Administration; this would allow the city to investigate adding grade separation between Humboldt Yards and this bridge. This application was granted in 2025, allowing planning to continue.

== See also ==
- List of crossings of the Upper Mississippi River
