= Paynesville Subdivision =

Railway line in Minnesota

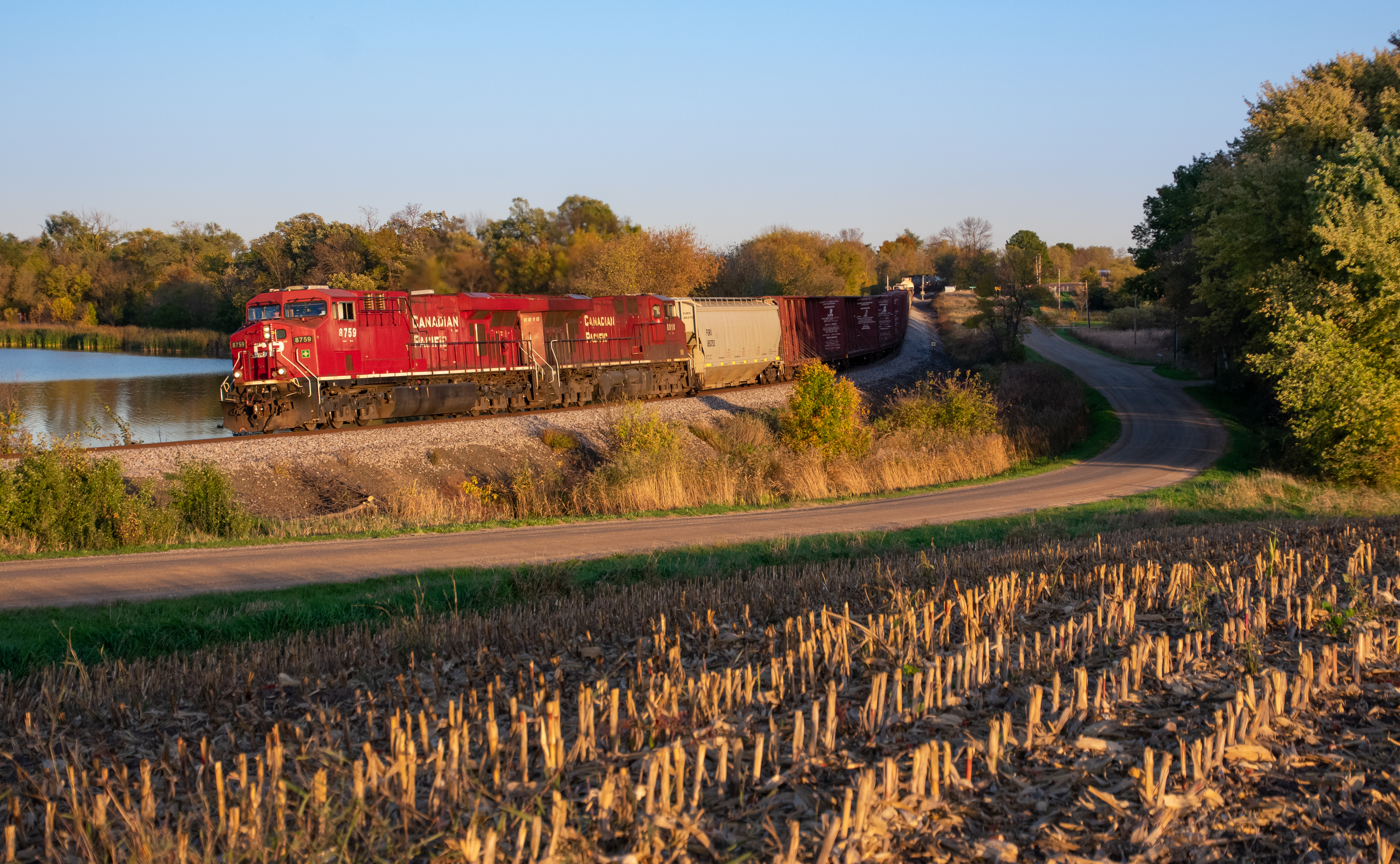
- CP train 299 sweeps through the curve into Maple Lake, MN.

Overview
- Owner: Canadian Pacific Kansas City

Technical
- Line length: 118 mi (190 km)
- Track gauge: 1,435 mm (4 ft 8 1/2 in) standard gauge
- Operating speed: 60 mph (97 km/h)

The Paynesville Subdivision or Paynesville Sub is a railway line that runs about 118 miles (190 km) from Glenwood to Minneapolis, Minnesota. The line is operated by Canadian Pacific Kansas City (CPKC) under the Soo Line Railroad, its US subsidiary. Construction on the line began in 1886 by the Minneapolis & Pacific Railway (which later merged with the Soo Line) which intended to build a railroad out to the Dakotas to supply grain to flour mills in Minneapolis. The line starts out at CP University and continues westward through the Humboldt Yard and crosses the BNSF Monticello Subdivision just east of the junction with MN&S Spur in Crystal. Then the line continues northwest through many small towns on its way to Glenwood.

Regular passenger service ended on March 25, 1967 with the discontinuation of the Winnipeger. As for freight traffic, the line sees many commodities ranging from grain and potash to crude oil, manifest and intermodal. This subdivision is of moderate capacity, carrying around 13 trains per day.

State Highway 55 closely follows the Sub for the majority of the route. The Paynesville Sub meets the Withrow Subdivision at CP University in Minneapolis at the eastern end near Shoreham. At its western end in Glenwood, there are connections to the Elbow Lake Subdivision to Enderlin, North Dakota and the Detroit Lakes Subdivision to Thief River Falls, Minnesota.
