= Mike Opat =

American politician

Member of the Hennepin County Board of Commissioners from the 1st district
- Incumbent
- Assumed office January 3, 1993
- Preceded by: John Derus

Personal details
- Born: March 25, 1961 (age 65) Minneapolis, Minnesota, U.S.
- Party: Democratic-Farmer-Labor
- Spouse: Kim Opat
- Children: Luke, Thomas, Tess
- Education: Harvard Kennedy School, Harvard University(M.P.P.); University of Minnesota (B.S.)
- Profession: County Commissioner

Michael Joseph Opat (born March 25, 1961) is an American politician from the U.S. state of Minnesota. He serves on the Hennepin County Board of Commissioners, the governing body for the largest county in Minnesota, with more than 1.25 million residents and an annual budget of $2.4 billion. Opat represents District 1 (out of 7 districts), an area that includes more than 170,000 residents and encompasses six suburban cities: Brooklyn Center, Brooklyn Park, Crystal, New Hope, Osseo, and Robbinsdale. In his time on the County Board, Opat has led, among other initiatives, policy and governance changes at Hennepin County Medical Center, numerous advancements in public infrastructure including the revitalization of the Humboldt Greenway, reconstruction of Highway 100 in the northern suburbs, construction of the new Brookdale library, the construction of Target Field and expansion of the Twin Cities area transit network, including the planned Metro Blue Line Extension along County Road 81 through the northern part of the county.

Opat has been described as one of the "most aggressive local government leaders", and said he considered a bid for the Minnesota Democratic-Farmer-Labor Party (DFL) nomination for governor of Minnesota in the 2010 election.

== Early life, education, and career ==
Opat was born on March 25, 1961, in North Minneapolis to mother Joan and father Harold Opat, an Ironworker. Opat attended the University of Minnesota - Twin Cities while working full-time at the Hennepin County Adult Correctional Facility, also known as the county "workhouse", and coaching basketball. After earning his Bachelor of Science degree in business in 1983, he continued at the workhouse as a Correctional Officer. In 1987, Opat was awarded the Minnesota Correctional Officer of the Year award by the Minnesota Corrections Association, which he says motivated him to apply to Harvard Kennedy School at Harvard University. After gaining his Masters of Public Policy from Harvard in 1989, Opat was promoted to Shift Supervisor and worked three more years at the workhouse before running for public office in 1992.

=== Hennepin County Board ===
==== 1992 election ====
Branded a "political novice," Opat decided to run for Hennepin County Commissioner in 1992, declaring that the incumbent, John Derus, was motivated by self-interest. Derus, one of Minneapolis's most durable politicians of the time, crushed Opat at the DFL nominating convention. But Opat emerged from the fall primary trailing Derus by only 173 votes, out of nearly 19,000 cast. Opat won the general election, and Derus graciously conceded. Opat credited that first victory to fortuitous timing and a team of about 200 volunteers who did it "because they wanted to, not because they had to."

Opat was elected as the Chair of the Hennepin County Board of Commissioners in January 2009, replacing Randy Johnson, a Republican who had been the board's chair since 2004. He went on to chair the board for a total of nine (9) years.

==== 2010 gubernatorial election ====
Saying that the 2010 gubernatorial election "will be won or lost in the suburbs," Opat, whose Hennepin district is 90 percent suburban, has said he is considering entering the race. Arguing that DFLers in the Legislature had "missed the point" in 2009, Opat has argued for pragmatism in electing a Democratic governor, saying that candidates at either end of the political spectrum aren't likely to be particularly effective at building consensus and governing. And the DFL needs to widen its base, he said. "We need to connect; we have to have a clear message about the DFL philosophy in 2009. Given the economic crisis, our neighbors are hurting, regardless of their political views."

== Policies and priorities ==
Opat describes himself as a "lifelong Democrat," and is a member of the Minnesota Democratic Farmer-Labor Party.

He endorsed then Senator Barack Obama via a letter to the Star Tribune in January 2008, saying the election was "the most important" in his lifetime. He cited the importance of Obama's domestic agenda to improve our infrastructure through road and transit initiatives, as well as the prospects of reasonable immigration policy. Opat's district includes more Liberian immigrants than anywhere in Minnesota.

=== Health care and human services ===
==== HCMC and Governance ====
Between 1997 and 2003, HCMC lost about $17 million annually in federal and state support and was unable to continue making significant investments in new technology, facilities maintenance and employee compensation. In addition, uncompensated care cases were increasing, putting more demand on HCMC's services. In 2004, Opat led the charge for a change in the governing structure of HCMC, which, as Hennepin County's hospital, was governed by the County Board.

Opat led the adoption of a task force's proposal to transfer day-to-day management of the hospital from the County Board to Hennepin Healthcare Systems Inc., a nonprofit governing board composed of doctors, local professionals, health-care executives and two county commissioners (Opat and Randy Johnson). Opat, in advocating the new arrangement said that it would "...let the hospital manage its labor costs more efficiently, move more nimbly in a competitive health care market, raise money for crucial capital investments and even seek out profitable new lines of business to subsidize its public mission." The Board adopted the proposal, and retained the power to review the hospital's operating mission every year. In addition, Hennepin County remains the ultimate financial backstop for the hospital and underwrites its "uncompensated care" losses.

The Minneapolis Star Tribune's editorial board called the new governance proposal "...a serious effort to solve a problem that no one else wants to acknowledge." The change went into effect in January 2007. HCMC once had a national reputation as a Level 1 Trauma Center, teaching, and safety-net hospital. In addition it has been recognized in excellency for oncology, pregnancies, burn treatment, hyperbaric medicine and obstetrics, and has consistently earned a spot on U.S. News & World Report's list of best hospitals.

==== Teen pregnancy prevention ====
Opat has said that preventing teen pregnancy "should be the county's first priority," and he has been an advocate for county funding of public school health and sex-education teachers who teach comprehensive pregnancy prevention. In defending the county spending, he has cited the 1,200 teen pregnancies a year in Hennepin County, and how they result in more expensive county services. The number of births to teenage mothers in northwestern Hennepin County has increased sharply - from an average of 270 births in 1995–2003, to over 310 births in both 2004 and 2005.

In May 2003, for his efforts in preventing teen pregnancy, Opat was awarded "Minnesota Organization on Adolescent Pregnancy, Prevention and Parenting" (MOAPPP)'s Policymaker of the Year award.

==== Developmental disabilities ====
In his 2009 State of the County address, Opat said that Hennepin County can never forget that it must be the face and the voice of the most vulnerable people — the poor, sick, aged, developmentally disabled, blind, deaf and hard-of-hearing. Opat is the legal guardian of his brother, who is developmentally disabled, and has served on the Minnesota Special Olympics Board of Directors. "We have to announce when help for the mentally ill or chronically homeless is threatened," he added "Our obligation is to minimize our clients' pain and preserve their independence and dignity as best we can."

== Public infrastructure ==
=== Metro Blue Line Extension ===
Bottineau Boulevard, also known as County Road 81, is a transport corridor that extends between Downtown Minneapolis and North Minneapolis through the northwest suburbs of the Twin Cities including; Golden Valley, Crystal, Robbinsdale, Osseo, Brooklyn Park and Maple Grove. In addition, Bottineau extends through the rapidly growing communities of Dayton, Rogers, and Hassan Township. The corridor has been continuously growing in traffic and population, with predictions showing a 30% increase in population between 2000 and 2025.

Home to a major hospital (North Memorial), North Hennepin Community College, Hennepin Technical College, a railway, two lakes, three creeks, and a major regional park, Bottineau was chosen in the "Metropolitan Council 2030 Transportation Policy Plan" as a corridor to advance for development as a busway.

However, due to the success of the METRO Blue Line Light Rail and lobbying by Opat, as well as the evolution of land use on the corridor, the mode choice was designated as a light rail transit corridor.

=== CTIB ===
In April 2008, the Hennepin County Board voted to enter into a joint powers agreement with Anoka County, Dakota County, and Ramsey County to form the Counties Transit Improvement Board (CTIB). These counties adopted a 0.25% sales tax that is used to fund expansion of metropolitan transit projects, including light rail and commuter rail. The board named Opat and Commissioner Peter McLaughlin as Hennepin County's representatives on CTIB. On the same day, Opat offered two amendments to the board, acting as the Hennepin County Regional Rail Authority (HCRRA), one of which named the Bottineau, Central, and Southwest corridors as "priority transit corridors" for Hennepin County. The other directed a property tax cut of more than 50% subsequent to the enactment of the sales tax.

In 2017, as permitted in the CTIB bylaws, the organization was dissolved so that the county could pursue its preferred transit priorities. Hennepin County is thus working to build two light rail transit lines.

=== Victory Memorial Drive ===
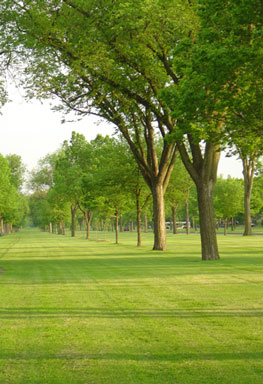
The greenway boulevard of Victory Memorial Drive

Guided by the legislatively created Victory Memorial Drive Task Force, which is co-chaired by Opat and Commissioner Mark Stenglein, and the principles of the Park Board's Victory Memorial Drive 2005 Master Plan, Hennepin County has programmed $3.5 million in its capital budget toward:

1. Restoring the historic street grid and parkway, and extending the green space.
2. Revitalizing the flagpole plaza.
3. Adding historic gateway monuments and entrances to the parkway at Humboldt Avenue North on the east, and Lowry Avenue North on the south.
4. Removing or replanting elm trees, using multiple species that are resistant to Dutch Elm disease, and restoring the rank-and-file grid that is at the heart of the memorial.

In 2009, the Minnesota State Legislature awarded $1 million in the Omnibus Bonding Bill for the project, as well as $40,000 in the "Omnibus Cultural and Outdoor Resources Finance Bill" for parks and trails.

=== REPP ===
Opat also launched the Roadside Enhancement Partnership Program, designed to beautify the pedestrian areas near roadways, including streetscapes, sidewalks, landscaping, masonry and public art.

=== Humboldt Greenway/Shingle Creek Parkway ===
The Humboldt Greenway project is the revitalization of the Shingle Creek and Lind-Bohanon neighborhoods by changing the character of Humboldt Avenue North to a landscaped greenway. Opat is credited for leading the revitalization for the avenue in the mid-1990s. Opat insisted the new neighborhood should offer home buyers a variety of housing that would be affordable to middle-class residents, provide enhanced views of Shingle Creek, and fit into the scale of homes found on Victory Memorial Drive. In 2000, work began to remove about 212 existing single family homes and replace them with about 270 new single family homes and townhomes, building value and enhancing the existing tax base through investment in parks and improved infrastructure. "I think the results are great, especially the public open spaces," Opat has said. "Humboldt Avenue is terrific, after we gave it a curving look, streetscaping and bike paths. There's better storm water runoff, too. We've even gotten the railroad to clean up its part of the area."

In 2002, Commonbond Communities opened the first of 235 housing units, named Shingle Creek Commons. The Commons is a 75-unit retirement living community, which addressed the needed supply in the area for senior rental housing.

In 2008, Kingsley Commons was completed on the Greenway, featuring 25 units, and becoming one of the nation's first apartment buildings designed to provide independent living to people with multiple sclerosis.

== Public safety ==
=== Productive Day ===
In 1994 Opat launched the "Productive Day" initiative which required inmates serving longer than a 15-day sentence at the Hennepin County Adult Correctional Facility to work or go to school for at least 8 hours per day. More than 100 employees participated in planning and implementing the change into one that emphasized work and education, rather than just "doing time." Opat cited the need to "motivate residents to develop skills, habits and abilities necessary to successfully integrate into the community and...gain economic self-sufficiency upon release" as a driving principle behind this initiative.

=== Crime ===
In November 2007, while outside his home in Robbinsdale, Opat was attacked by two assailants, one of whom wielded a sawed off shotgun. He was hit with the butt of the gun, then knocked down, kicked, and punched. While lying in the alley, Opat grabbed the gun barrel and broke free, running to safety. He lost his vehicle, his wallet, and his cellphone, but escaped with only minor injuries. The car was recovered, but the assailants have not been identified.

In his 2009 State of the County address, Opat proposed an initiative to form a crime lab work group to examine crime lab services, such as DNA analysis and identification in Hennepin County, and make recommendations for the efficiencies of the services of the Hennepin County Sheriff's Office and the City of Minneapolis Police Department.

== Minnesota Twins ballpark ==
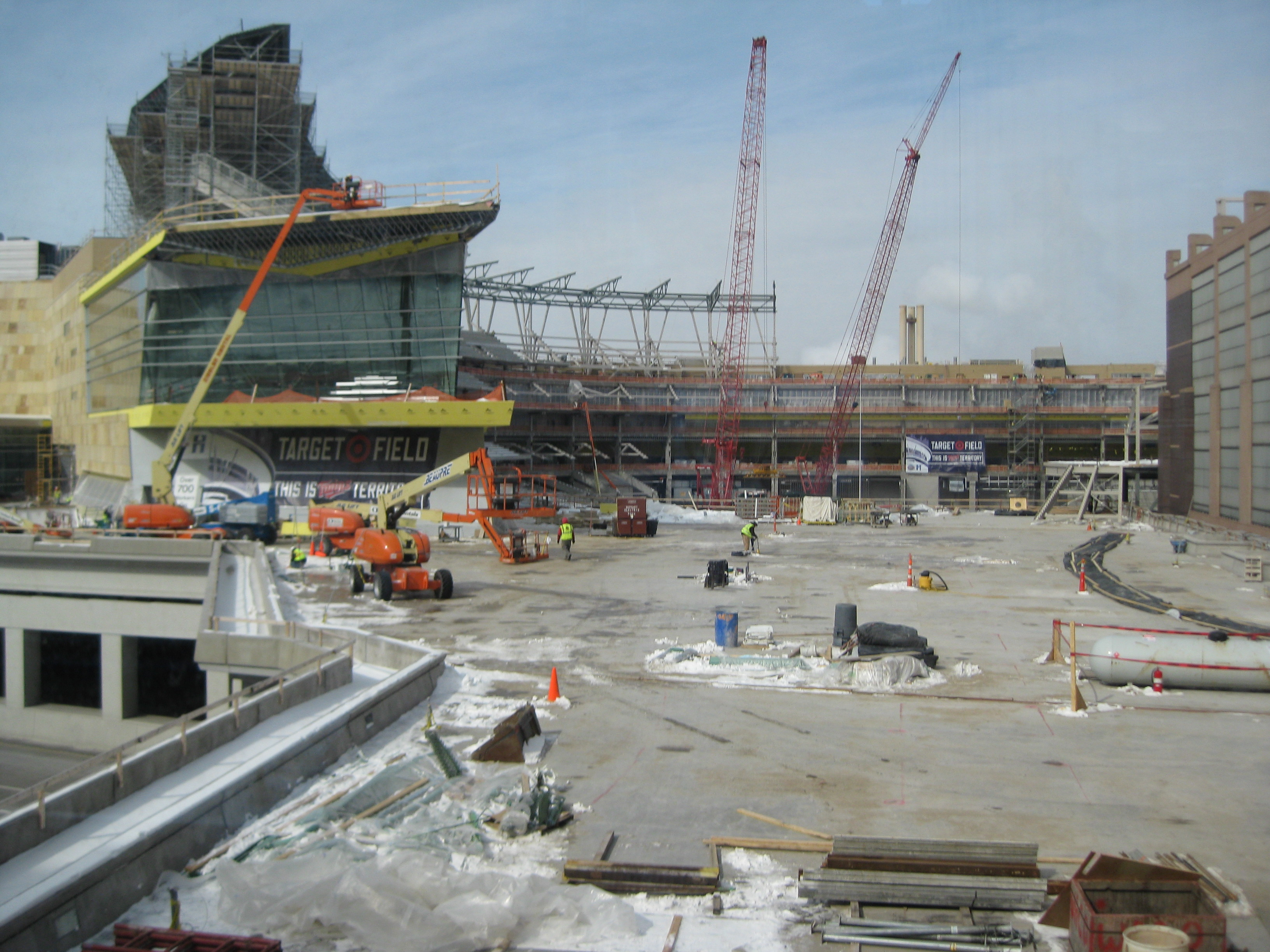
Target Field construction in March 2009.

In 2006, Commissioner Opat led the effort with the Minnesota Twins to finance and build the new outdoor ballpark in downtown Minneapolis. This was despite the fact that "Public opinion polls have shown that a majority of Minnesotans don't favor public financing for stadiums." It was scheduled to open in April 2010.

=== Construction ===
"I am proud that we are building this important public amenity at a time when jobs are crucial," Opat has said "It's the first of many investments on the new edge of downtown Minneapolis, and will pay many dividends into the future."

== Chairmanships ==
=== 2001–2003 ===
Since his election, Opat was a frequent critic of Chairman Randy Johnson, and was a behind the scenes competitor for the chairmanship four times between 1992 and 2000. Opat did eventually unseat him as Board Chairman in 2001, following a 5–2 board vote.

=== 2009–2015 ===
The board unanimously elected Opat chairman once more in January 2009 and through 2015.

=== 2009 State of the County Address ===
In April 2009, in what was called a "powerful performance by an unlikely star in Minnesota politics," Opat gave the "2009 State of Hennepin County Address" at the University of Minnesota Carlson School of Management. Noting the "bleak times" for public institutions like Hennepin County with many low-income residents, Opat stated that "the state of Hennepin County is challenged, but not imperiled," and he urged the County to lead new innovations and public investments.

Opat proposed three new initiatives:

1. A framework for the county to award up to $2 million each year in capital grants for youth activities in Hennepin, as part of the ballpark project.
2. An Urban Lakes Initiative that would address the water quality of badly impaired lakes in the county's inner-ring suburbs. Opat cited recent water-quality tests that gave either a "D" or "F" to 25 lakes in the county, and proposed partnering with cities and water management groups to seek grants to make major improvements.
3. A crime lab workgroup composed of public safety experts to examine crime lab services in the county and study options for combining the crime labs of the Hennepin County Sheriff's Office and the Minneapolis Police Department and make recommendations this fall to the Hennepin County Board.

A local blogger said the address as demonstrated "a progressive in command of his message and in sync with his constituents."

== Controversy ==
Mike Opat is a defendant in a defamation lawsuit brought forth by Kevin and Valerie Holler.

Comments by Opat and Stenglein "might be read specifically as intending to damage the Hollers' reputation and to shame them into selling the property," wrote a three-judge panel of the state Court of Appeals. Reports the Star Tribune.

The Minnesota Appeals Court decision can be found on the mn.gov website: http://mn.gov/lawlib/archive/ctapun/2014/opa131014-020314.pdf

Hennepin County Attorney's office disagreed with the three judge panel of the Court of Appeals and petitioned the Supreme Court of Minnesota for further review. The petition was denied (April 15, 2014; number 19 of 37).
