= Metro Blue Line Extension =

Metro Blue Line Extension may refer to:

- Blue Line (Bangkok)#History
- Blue Line (Montreal Metro)#Eastern extension to Anjou
- Metro Blue Line Extension (Minnesota)

== See also ==
- Blue Line (disambiguation)
