= Camden Industrial Area, Minneapolis =

Neighborhood in Minneapolis

Coordinates: 44°59′56″N 93°13′45″W

Camden Industrial Area
- Neighborhood
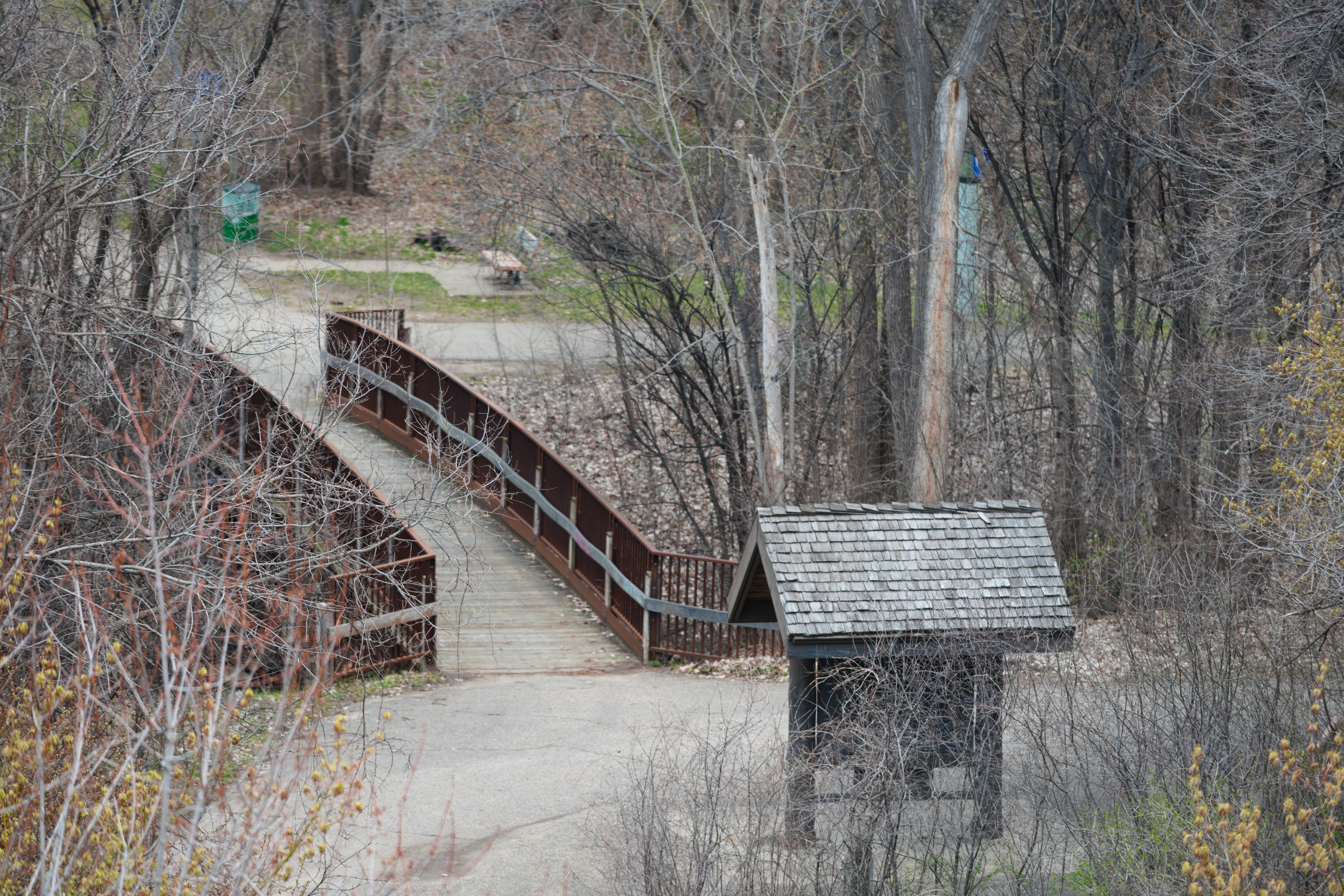
- The southern portion of North Mississippi Regional Park is within the Camden Industrial Area.

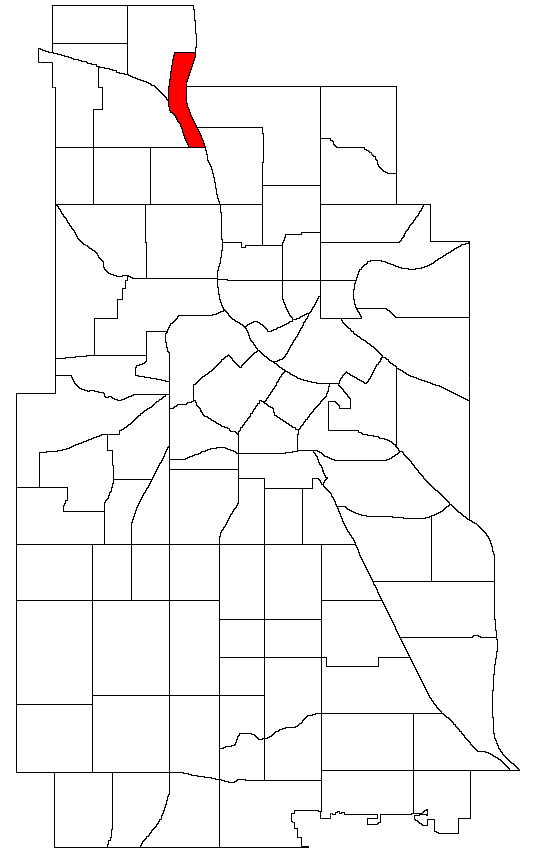
- Location of Camden Industrial within Minneapolis
- Interactive map of Camden Industrial Area
- Country: United States
- State: Minnesota
- County: Hennepin
- City: Minneapolis
- Community: Camden
- Historic District: C.A. Smith Lumber Historic District
- City Council Ward: 4

Government
- Time zone: UTC-6 (CST)
  - Summer (DST): UTC-5 (CDT)
- ZIP code: 55401, 55413, 55414
- Area code: 612

Camden Industrial Area is an official neighborhood in the Camden community of Minneapolis. It is located along the west bank of the Mississippi River and includes several industrial businesses, a portion of the North Mississippi Regional Park, a few residents, establishments, and other undeveloped space. Several industrial buildings in the area date to the turn of the 20th century and are now part of the C.A. Smith Lumber Historic District, an important part of North Minneapolis' contributions to the industrial growth of the city.

== Description and notable features ==
The neighborhood is located in Minneapolis City Council Ward 4, currently represented by Minneapolis City Council member LaTrisha Vetaw. The area is geographically distinct and not part of any other residential neighborhood in the Camden community. The industrial area’s boundaries are 48th Avenue North to the north, Dowling Avenue North to the south, the middle of the Mississippi River to the east, and Lyndale Avenue/Washington Avenue to the west. The area has 38 establishments employing 708 people.

Located on the western bank of the river, North Mississippi Regional Park features walking and biking trails, boat launches, fishing piers, and playgrounds. Interstate 94 traverses the area. The Camden and SOO Line bridges cross the Mississippi River and connect the industrial area to Northeast Minneapolis. The Camden Bridge provides an important linkage on the Grand Rounds trail system.

=== C.A. Smith Lumber Historic District ===
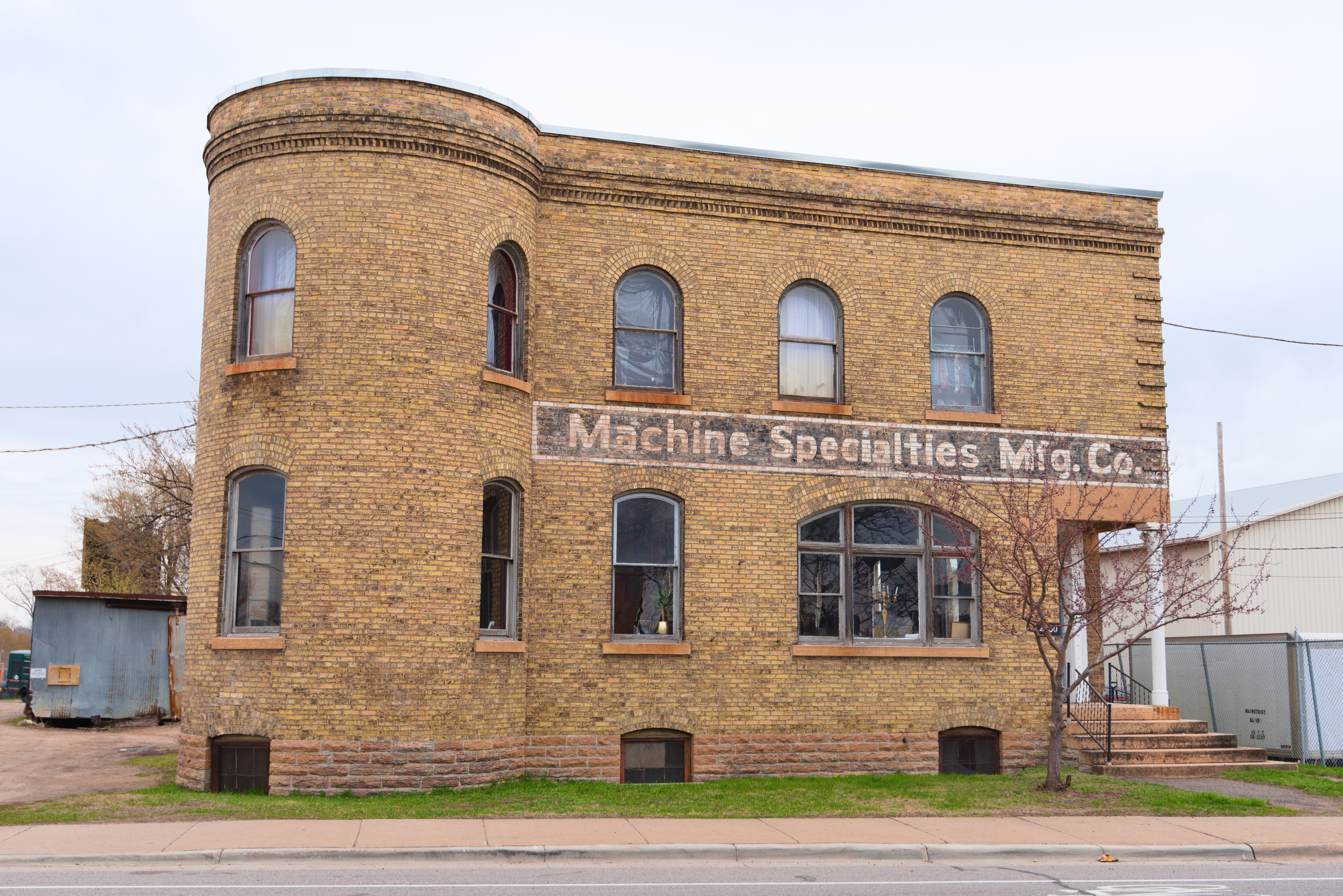
Built in 1892, the "castle building" on Lyndale Avenue North in 2022.

The C.A. Smith Lumber Historic District is located along the 4400 block of Lyndale Avenue North. It is an important part of the last stage of Minneapolis’ timber industry. It is named after Charles A. Smith, a Swedish immigrant born in 1852, who led the development of timber production in the area.

The "castle building" at 4400 Lyndale Avenue North was built in 1892 as the offices of C.A. Smith Lumber Company, which had saw mills on the Mississippi River. The building has had many uses over the ensuing years. Today it is part of the locally designated C.A. Smith Lumber Historic District. The historic industrial area was once larger, but lumber yards west of Lyndale Avenue were converted to residential neighborhoods in the 1920s.

== See also ==
- History of the lumber industry in the United States
- History of Minneapolis
- Humboldt Industrial Area, Minneapolis
