= Victory, Minneapolis =

Coordinates: 45.0335°N 93.3155°W

Victory
- Neighborhood
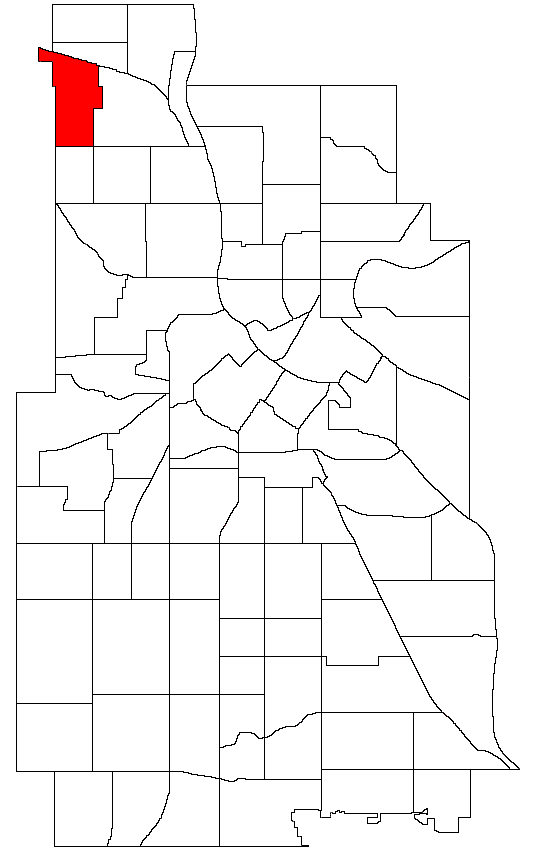
- Location of Victory within the U.S. city of Minneapolis
- Interactive map of Victory
- Country: United States
- State: Minnesota
- County: Hennepin
- City: Minneapolis
- Community: Camden
- City Council Ward: 4

Government
  - Council Member: LaTrisha Vetaw

Area
  - Total: 0.684 sq mi (1.77 km^{2})

Population (2020)
  - Total: 4,669
  - Density: 6,830/sq mi (2,640/km^{2})
- Time zone: UTC-6 (CST)
  - Summer (DST): UTC-5 (CDT)
- ZIP code: 55412, 55430
- Area code: 612

Historical population
Census	Pop.	Note	%±
1980	4,815		—
1990	4,750		−1.3%
2000	4,975		4.7%
2010	4,580		−7.9%
2020	4,669		1.9%

The Victory neighborhood is located within the Camden community of Minneapolis. It is bordered by the Humboldt Industrial Area on the north, Penn Avenue on the east, Dowling Avenue on the south, and the town of Robbinsdale on the west. It is located in Ward 4, represented by council member LaTrisha Vetaw.

Victory Memorial Parkway, from which the neighborhood takes its name, runs through the neighborhood and forms part of the western border.

== History ==
The Victory neighborhood was once home to the many factory and mill workers of north Minneapolis in the early 20th century. After World War I, the city named Victory Memorial Parkway and built upon it a memorial to all local soldiers who died in the World Wars.

== Demographics ==
Race/ethnicity
Race/ethnicity	2000		2010		2020	
Race/ethnicity	Number	%	Number	%	Number	%
White alone	3,552	71.40	3,068	66.99	2,936	62.15
Black alone	761	15.30	798	17.42	839	17.76
Hispanic or Latino (any race)	110	2.21	220	4.80	321	6.80
Native American alone	39	0.78	36	0.77	66	1.40
Asian alone	278	5.59	235	5.13	175	3.70
Other race alone	7	0.14	23	0.50	42	0.89
Pacific Islander alone	1	0.02	3	0.07	2	0.04
Two or more races	227	4.56	197	4.30	343	7.26
Total	4,975	100.0	4,580	100.0	4,724	100.0

== Gallery ==
A vintage streetlight shines over Victory Memorial Drive

Irises and Lilacs blossom in a Victory neighborhood garden
