= Metro Blue Line Extension (Minnesota) =

Planned light rail extension in Hennepin County, Minnesota

Overview
- Other name: Bottineau LRT
- Status: Engineering phase
- Locale: Hennepin County, Minnesota
- Termini: Brooklyn Park, Minnesota; Target Field, Minneapolis, Minnesota
- Stations: 13 planned
- Website: https://bluelineext.org

Service
- Type: Light rail
- System: Metro Transit
- Daily ridership: 11,500 – 13,000 (projection)

History
- Planned opening: 2033 (anticipated)

Technical
- Line length: 13.4 mi (21.6 km)
- Character: Surface
- Track gauge: 4 ft 8 1/2 in (1,435 mm) standard gauge
- Electrification: Overhead lines

The Metro Blue Line Extension (sometimes referred to as the Bottineau LRT) is a proposed light rail line extension in Hennepin County, Minnesota, projected to run northwest from Target Field station in downtown Minneapolis to the communities of North Minneapolis, Robbinsdale, Crystal, and Brooklyn Park.

The selected alignment was initially planned to run adjacent to a BNSF freight line, but opposition from the company has forced the project to be redesigned with a new routing. The project will now primarily run along County Road 81 (Bottineau Boulevard).

== Route history ==
The Bottineau Transitway Alternative Analysis Study, released in 2009, outlined several different alternatives for both the northern and southern ends of the corridor. In 2010, the final AA report recommended the A-D1 light rail alignment as the best option, but also suggested B-D1, A-D2 and B-D2 should continue to be studied. A-D1 and B-D1 were also recommended for continued study as possible bus rapid transit alignments.

=== Northern alternatives ===
There were two northern alternatives:

Alternative A began in Maple Grove and ran along Arbor Lakes Parkway and 77th Avenue from Hemlock Lane to the railroad tracks of BNSF Railway's Monticello Subdivision. The potential stations were Hemlock Lane, Zachary Lane, Boone Avenue and 71st Avenue.

Alternative B began in Brooklyn Park near Target North Corporate Campus and ran south along West Broadway to the BNSF railroad tracks. The potential stations were 97th Avenue, 93rd Avenue, 85th Avenue and Brooklyn Boulevard. 71st Avenue Station, though it would have run along this alignment's right-of-way, would not be built if this alternative were selected.

=== Middle segment ===
Through the middle portion of the corridor, the study selected a single alternative. This alternative followed 8 miles of BNSF right-of-way, paralleling County Road 81, from Interstate 694 to 36th Avenue. The proposed stations are 63rd Avenue, Bass Lake Road and Robbinsdale Transit Center. This alignment was known as Alternative C.

=== Southern alternatives ===
The southern part of the corridor had four potential alignments. Three could be used for light rail or bus rapid transit and one would be strictly for bus rapid transit. Every alternative would still terminate at Target Field station.

Alternative D1 would continue to follow the BNSF right of way south to Olson Memorial Highway (Minnesota State Highway 55) and would follow Olson Memorial Highway into downtown. Stations would be located at Theodore Wirth Park, Golden Valley Road, Penn Avenue and Van White Boulevard.

Alternative D2 would run entirely along streets, instead of partially along railroad right-of-way. It would follow West Broadway to Penn Avenue and Penn Avenue to Olson Memorial Highway into downtown. Stations would be located at North Memorial Medical Center, West Broadway at Penn Ave, Penn Ave at Plymouth Ave and Olson Memorial Highway at Van White Boulevard.

Two additional alternatives, D3 and D4, were essentially eliminated in the 2010 report.

=== Alignment alternatives study results ===
The alternative analysis study concluded that the best alignment for the Bottineau Corridor would be light rail transit service using Alternatives B, C and D1. The line scored well overall for the three categories of Corridor Benefits, Development Opportunities and Environmental Impacts. The Cost/Benefit Analysis pushed this corridor to the highest position of the potential corridors. This corridor would serve an estimated 27,000 daily riders by 2030. It would take 29 minutes to travel from Brooklyn Park to downtown Minneapolis, a few minutes more than the express bus service. The construction cost estimate for the corridor is $1 billion, in 2017 dollars. Though bus rapid transit would have cost significantly less, estimated at $560 million, it is also estimated that there would have been only 19,900 daily riders.

== Transit mode ==
The Northwest Corridor was proposed as a Tier I transitway, for rapid development, in the Metropolitan Council's 2030 Transportation Policy Plan published in 2004. In a region with no operational light rail lines, ridership numbers appeared too low to justify the expense of light rail in this corridor. The line was fast-tracked for development into a busway and much of the work was completed to receive federal funding for construction of a busway.

Though this corridor was advanced by the Metropolitan Council for development as a busway, the success of the Blue Line and lobbying by Hennepin County commissioner Mike Opat forced the mode choice to be re-evaluated. In March 2007, the Bottineau Partnership resolved to conduct an alternatives analysis rather than simply building the busway. Hennepin County commissioned a full Alternatives Analysis, to be completed by mid-2009.

The recent creation of the Counties Transit Improvement Board, which controlled a new dedicated transit tax for the Twin Cities region, had created a strong new push for light rail corridor development. According to the legislation enacting the Counties Transit Improvement Board, in order for a project to receive CTIB funding, it must be part of the Metropolitan Council's long-term transit plan; new planning documents released April 11, 2008, by the Metropolitan Council indicate that the Bottineau Corridor was a strong prospect for LRT, with numbers supporting LRT development. Ridership predictions for the corridor, though lower than those for either the Central or Southwest corridors, were much higher than estimates before the opening of the Blue Line. The Metropolitan Council echoed this sentiment in February 2024 when discussing revised ridership projections for the light rail line.

On June 9, 2025, the Minnesota Legislature directed the Metropolitan Council to conduct another alternatives analysis to determine the suitability of bus rapid transit for the corridor. The report is required to be submitted to the legislature by June 15, 2026.

== Design ==
In August 2014, the Metropolitan Council received federal approval to enter the design phase for the Bottineau LRT, with service expected to begin in 2021. The $997 million light rail extension would be 50% funded by the Federal Transit Administration, 30% by the Counties Transit Improvement Board, 10% by Hennepin County and 10% by the state of Minnesota. Kimley-Horn was awarded an engineering contract worth up to $110 million in September 2014.

By 2019, the line was expected to start construction in 2020 and start service in 2024, but as of 2024, the Metropolitan Council estimates an opening date of 2030.

== Realignment ==
On March 11, 2021, the Metropolitan Council and Hennepin County released revised potential route options for the proposed Blue Line Extension. The proposed new routes retained the northern part of the original alignment and still terminated at Target Field in downtown Minneapolis. However, they offered several different paths through north Minneapolis, and (unlike the original plan) all bypassed the suburb of Golden Valley. They avoided BNSF right-of-way by using Bottineau Boulevard. At the south end of the extension, the routes used various combinations of surface streets, including Broadway Avenue, Lowry Avenue, and Washington Avenue.

The decision to realign the route was driven by concerns over negotiations with BNSF, a situation the Metropolitan Council experienced previously with the Metro Green Line Extension alignment. In that project, Hennepin County planners changed preliminary plans from relocating freight rail to colocating freight rail, resulting in planning delays. The resultant route led to extensive construction delays, cost overruns, and allegations of fraud and mismanagement for the Metropolitan Council, with some arguing Hennepin County's choice of route was the driving factor behind ballooning costs.

In April 2022, the Metropolitan Council released a route modification report outlining engineering and engagement done to identify the full route. This included assessing property impacts, population density, walkshed, and future opportunities for property development. Following the release of this report, the city engaged with the public from April 18, 2022 to May 27, 2022 to assess opinions on the more detailed route. During this process, many residents expressed concerns with light rail trains running north on Lyndale Avenue, west of Interstate 94. As a result, project staff recommended two alternatives for trains going northbound on Washington Avenue instead: one that used land directly east of Interstate 94 to connect to Washington Avenue, and one that used 10th Avenue North to connect to Washington Avenue. While some North Loop residents favored the former alignment, in August 2023 project staff recommended an alignment that would have light rail trains run along east on 10th Avenue and north on Washington Avenue, instead of north on Lyndale Avenue. This routing was later approved, moving design planning forward.

In August 2024, the Metropolitan Council began the process of municipal consent, where each city along the route makes comments and requests changes based on more advanced design documents. In this process, a "no" vote does not deny the project going through a municipality, rather, it simply requires the Metropolitan Council to review a list of requests that a municipality would need in order to vote "yes." All cities along the route approved the plans, with Minneapolis getting commitments from project staff to add a new station at the corner of Washington Avenue and West Broadway Avenue and Robbinsdale getting the downtown Robbinsdale station moved to the north side of 40th Avenue and Bottineau Boulevard.

== Opposition ==
=== Freight rail ===
For 8 miles (13 km) of the original 13 miles (21 km) route, light rail trains would have run parallel to the freight rail tracks of BNSF's Monticello Subdivision. The Federal Transit Administration required the Metropolitan Council to have approval from BNSF Railway before moving forward with the grant process and construction. BNSF was not receptive to co-locating light rail trains in the corridor, though the line hosts only two trains per day, has a maximum speed of 25 mph (40 km/h), and BNSF had negotiated a co-location agreement for the Green Line extension through their Wayzata Subdivision. Spokesperson Amy McBeth from BNSF Railway stated "We don’t want to leave anyone with the impression we are negotiating. We are not," and "We’ve told Met Council repeatedly for the past several years and as recently as this spring that we are not proceeding with any discussion of passenger rail on our property in this corridor." On July 29, 2020, BNSF reiterated its longstanding stance. "We are a freight railroad that moves the goods that we all use every day; we provide a vital service, particularly in these unprecedented times. The proposed Blue Line light rail project does not meet our high standards." On August 3, 2020, the Metropolitan Council announced they would begin to "explore opportunities to advance this critical project without using BNSF Railway right of way."

=== Community ===
Since the realignment announcement in 2021 by Hennepin County moving the proposed route off BNSF right of way, increased opposition to the project was seen along the route, such as in Robbinsdale, Near North, and North Loop. Opponents often make comparisons to past and present harms of large transportation projects in predominantly Black neighborhoods, such as the negative impacts of Interstate 94 on the Rondo neighborhood of Saint Paul and gentrification. In North Minneapolis, some criticized the project for the uncertainty around property they owned or leased during route development, as each proposed route required some land acquisition. Hennepin County and the Metropolitan Council created an Anti-Displacement Work Group in combination with the University of Minnesota's Center for Urban and Regional Affairs to address displacement concerns, the result of which was a report published by the Metropolitan Council and $10 million in funding allocated by the Minnesota State Legislature towards anti-displacement efforts. Business owners on West Broadway Avenue, where the 2021 realignment was originally supposed to run, put up signs in their businesses and spoke to media outlets about their opposition to the project.

During public engagement for the new route in 2022, the Metropolitan Council noted that some had concerns with changes to traffic, parking, as well concerns about the Metropolitan Council's ability to complete a light rail project, a sentiment driven by cost overruns and delays on the Metro Green Line Extension project. Some Minneapolis Park Board members objected to the design of the Lowry Avenue station, stating that the at-grade crossing with light rail track and the Grand Rounds bike trail would create hazards for cyclists and pedestrians. In February 2025, the Lowry Avenue station was modified to use grade separation with Theodore Wirth Parkway and Lowry Avenue.
