= Camden Bridge =

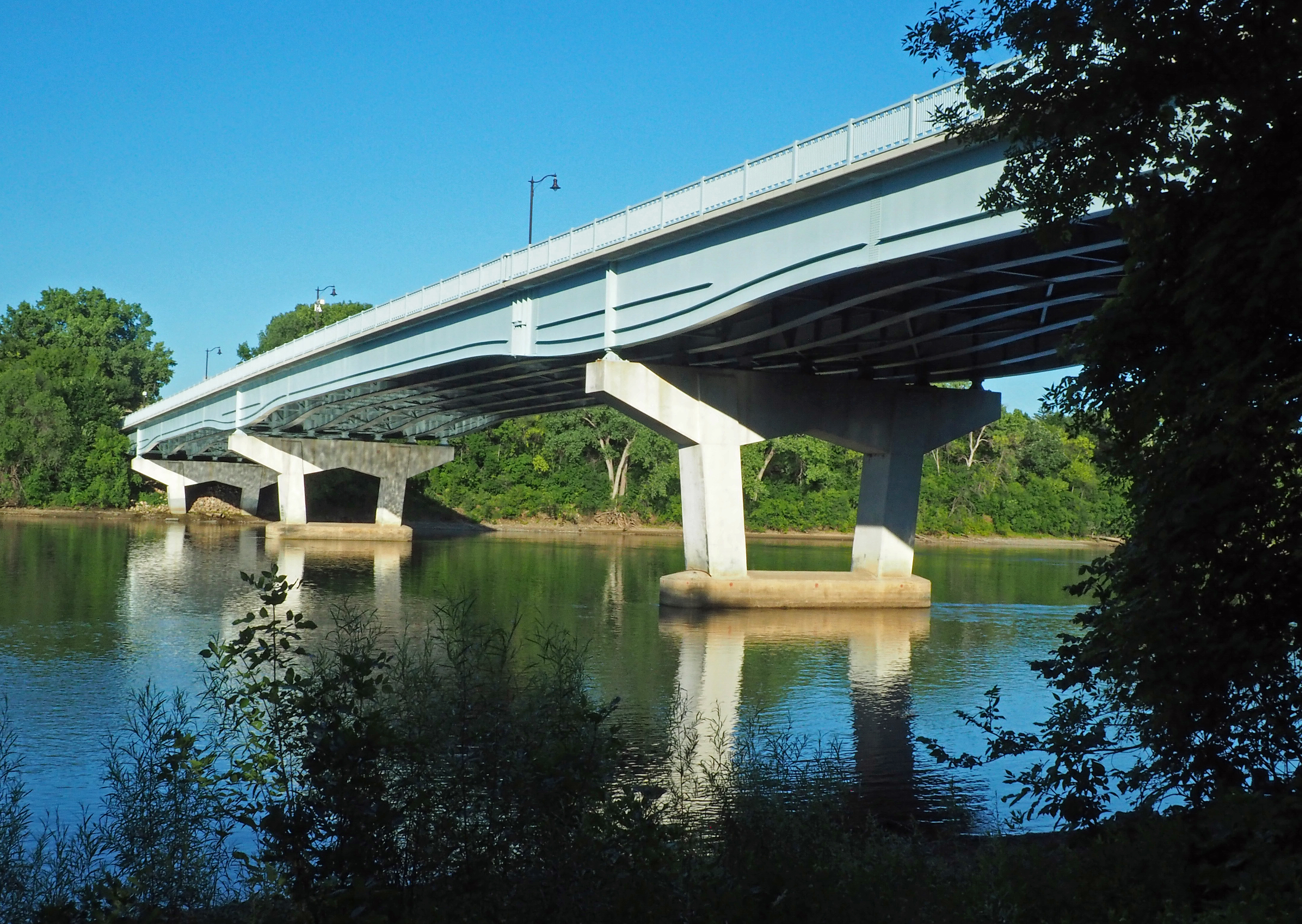
- The Camden Bridge as viewed from the west bank of the Mississippi
- Coordinates: 45°01′56″N 93°17′00″W
- Carries: Four lanes of traffic
- Crosses: Mississippi River
- Locale: Minneapolis, Minnesota
- Maintained by: City of Minneapolis
- ID number: 27549

Characteristics
- Design: Plate girder bridge
- Total length: 1,686 feet (513.89 m)
- Width: 70 feet (21.34 m)
- Longest span: 244 feet (74.37 m)
- Clearance below: 31 feet (9.45 m)

History
- Opened: 1977

Camden Bridge is a continuous span plate girder bridge, that spans the Mississippi River in Minneapolis. It connects 42nd Avenue North in the Camden community’s industrial area on the west side of the river to 37th Avenue Northeast in Northeast Minneapolis on the east side. It also links Webber Parkway (on the west side) to St. Anthony Parkway on the east side, completing a link in the Grand Rounds Scenic Byway. It was built in 1977 and was designed by Jacus Associates Incorporated.

The bridge was closed in April 2010 for a six-month resurfacing project and reopened ahead of schedule on August 21, 2010.

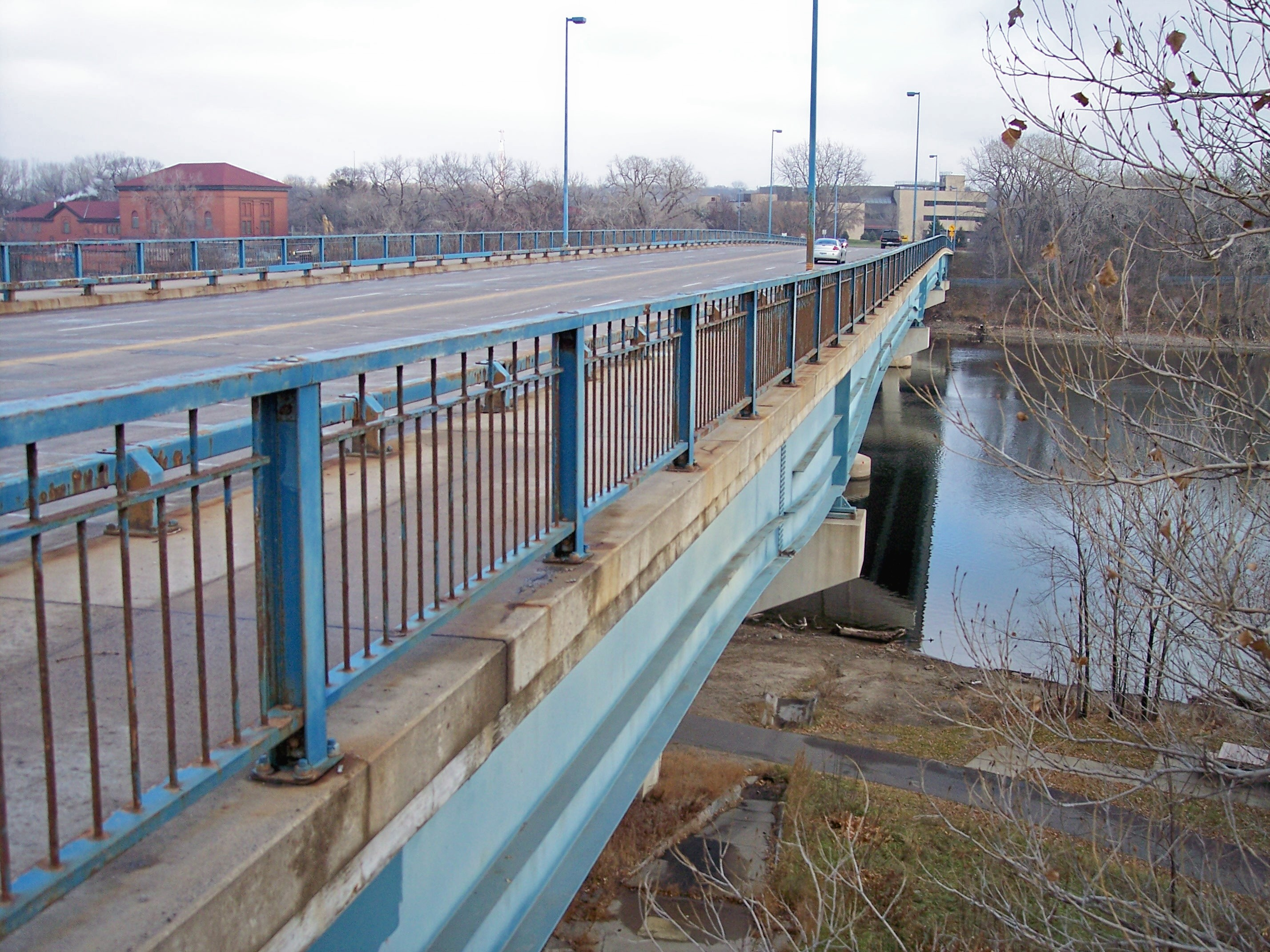
The Camden Bridge at street level, looking east into Northeast Minneapolis

== See also ==
- List of crossings of the Upper Mississippi River
