= McKinley, Minneapolis =

Coordinates: 45.0205°N 93.2837°W

McKinley
- Neighborhood
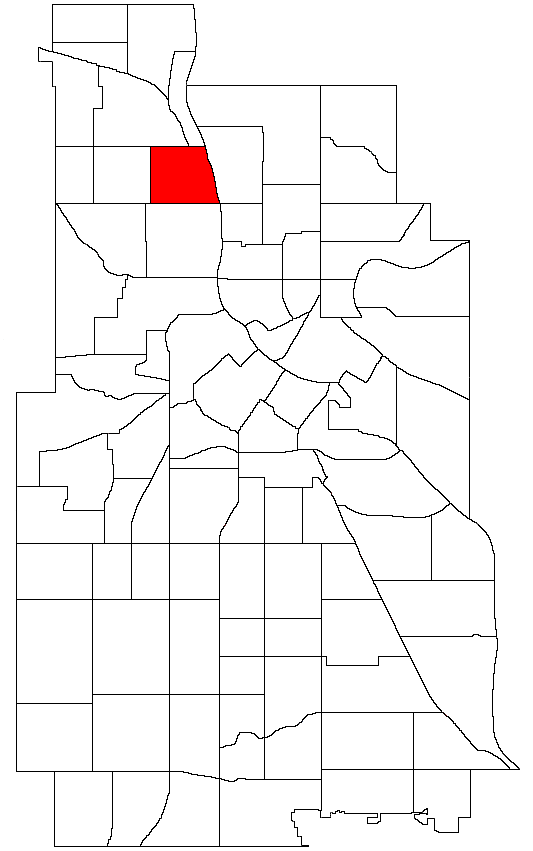
- Location of McKinley within the U.S. city of Minneapolis
- Interactive map of McKinley
- Country: United States
- State: Minnesota
- County: Hennepin
- City: Minneapolis
- Community: Camden
- City Council Ward: 4

Government
  - Council Member: LaTrisha Vetaw

Area
  - Total: 0.607 sq mi (1.57 km^{2})

Population (2020)
  - Total: 3,184
  - Density: 5,250/sq mi (2,030/km^{2})
- Time zone: UTC-6 (CST)
  - Summer (DST): UTC-5 (CDT)
- ZIP code: 55411, 55412
- Area code: 612

Historical population
Census	Pop.	Note	%±
1980	3,286		—
1990	3,298		0.4%
2000	3,658		10.9%
2010	3,132		−14.4%
2020	3,184		1.7%

McKinley is a neighborhood in the Camden community of Minneapolis. It is bound to the north by Dowling Avenue North, to the south by Lowry Avenue North, to the west by Dupont Avenue North, and to the east by the Mississippi River. It is part of the larger and located in Ward 4, represented by council member LaTrisha Vetaw.

The neighborhood is named for William McKinley, the 25th president of the United States. Many of the homes are two-story, single-family homes with wood frames; bungalows and some small stucco Tudor-style homes. Most of the houses were built between 1910 and 1930. Perkins Hill is the neighborhood park, located between 34th and 35th avenues North near Interstate 94.

== Demographics ==
Race/ethnicity
Race/ethnicity	2000		2010		2020	
Race/ethnicity	Number	%	Number	%	Number	%
White alone	1,080	29.52	793	25.32	696	21.38
Black alone	1,589	43.44	1,323	42.24	1,302	40.00
Hispanic or Latino (any race)	126	3.44	296	9.45	500	15.36
Native American alone	103	2.82	57	1.82	50	1.54
Asian alone	581	15.88	478	15.26	483	14.84
Other race alone	7	0.19	16	0.51	15	0.46
Pacific Islander alone	0	0.00	2	0.06	0	0.00
Two or more races	172	4.70	167	5.33	209	6.42
Total	3,658	100.0	3,132	100.0	3,255	100.0
