= Webber-Camden, Minneapolis =

Coordinates: 45.0293°N 93.2998°W

Webber-Camden
- Neighborhood
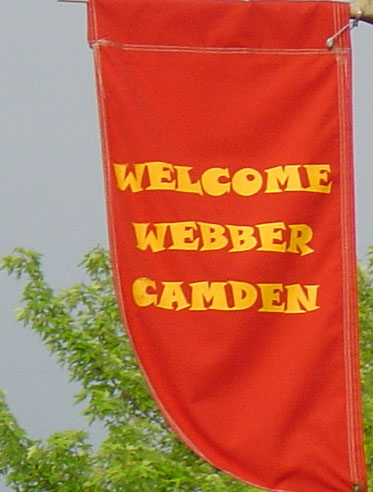
- Banners hanging from streetlights welcome visitors to the Webber-Camden neighborhood

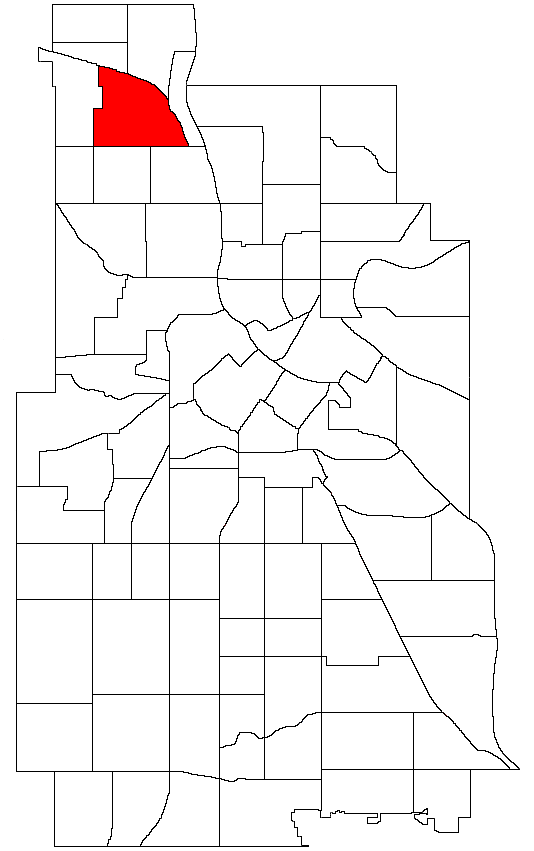
- Location of Webber-Camden within the U.S. city of Minneapolis
- Interactive map of Webber-Camden
- Country: United States
- State: Minnesota
- County: Hennepin
- City: Minneapolis
- Community: Camden
- City Council Ward: 4

Government
  - Council Member: LaTrisha Vetaw

Area
  - Total: 0.92 sq mi (2.4 km^{2})

Population (2020)
  - Total: 5,744
  - Density: 6,200/sq mi (2,400/km^{2})
- Time zone: UTC-6 (CST)
  - Summer (DST): UTC-5 (CDT)
- ZIP code: 55412
- Area code: 612

Historical population
Census	Pop.	Note	%±
1980	5,179		—
1990	4,948		−4.5%
2000	5,676		14.7%
2010	5,097		−10.2%
2020	5,744		12.7%

Webber-Camden is a neighborhood in the Camden community of Minneapolis. Its boundaries are Penn and Newton avenues to the west, the Canadian Pacific Railway tracks to the north, Interstate 94 to the east, and Dowling Avenue to the south. It is located in Ward 4, represented by council member LaTrisha Vetaw.

The neighborhood was just known as "Camden" until 1995, when the city added "Webber" to the name. Webber Park and Webber Parkway are located in the neighborhood. It is also the home of, and namesake for, Camden High School.

== Demographics ==
Race/ethnicity
Race/ethnicity	2000		2010		2020	
Race/ethnicity	Number	%	Number	%	Number	%
White alone	2,690	47.39	1,925	37.77	1,703	30.05
Black alone	1,651	29.09	1,965	38.55	2,153	37.99
Hispanic or Latino (any race)	264	4.65	327	6.42	735	12.97
Native American alone	94	1.66	99	1.94	99	1.75
Asian alone	683	12.03	488	9.57	512	9.03
Other race alone	24	0.42	20	0.39	54	0.95
Pacific Islander alone	8	0.14	1	0.02	2	0.04
Two or more races	262	4.62	272	5.34	410	7.23
Total	5,676	100.0	5,097	100.0	5,668	100.0
