= Bohanon Park =

City park in Minneapolis, Minnesota, United States

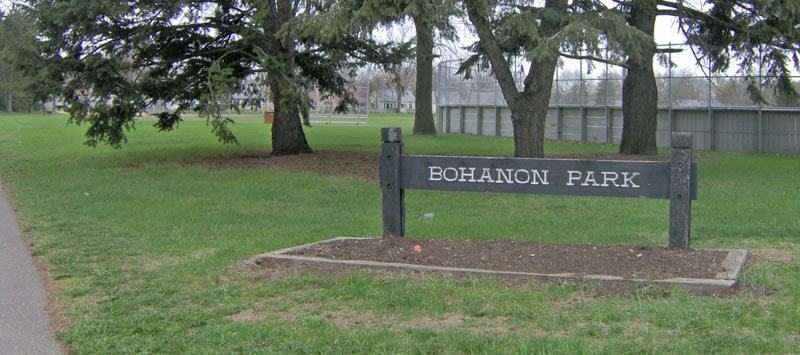
- Interactive map of Bohanon Park
- Type: Urban park
- Location: Minneapolis, Minnesota
- Coordinates: 45°02′42″N 93°17′35″W
- Status: Open all year

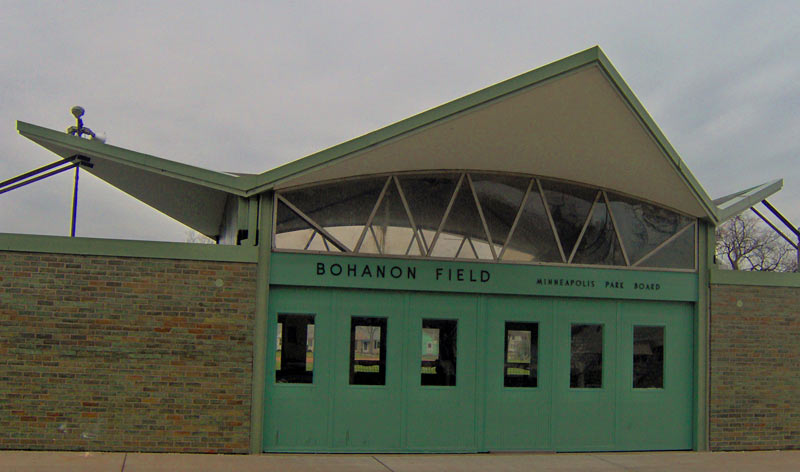
Bohanon Park Facilities Building

Bohanon Park is a city park located in the Lind-Bohanon neighborhood of Minneapolis, MN.

== Borders ==
The park is surrounded by North Dupont Ave to the west, North Bryant Ave .to the east and 49th Ave .North to the south. The park shares a border with Jenny Lind Elementary School to the north.

== Amenities ==
- Ice skating rink
- Baseball/softball fields
- Cricket field
- Tennis courts
- Basketball courts
- Playground equipment
