= Elbow Lake Subdivision =

Railway line in Minnesota and North Dakota

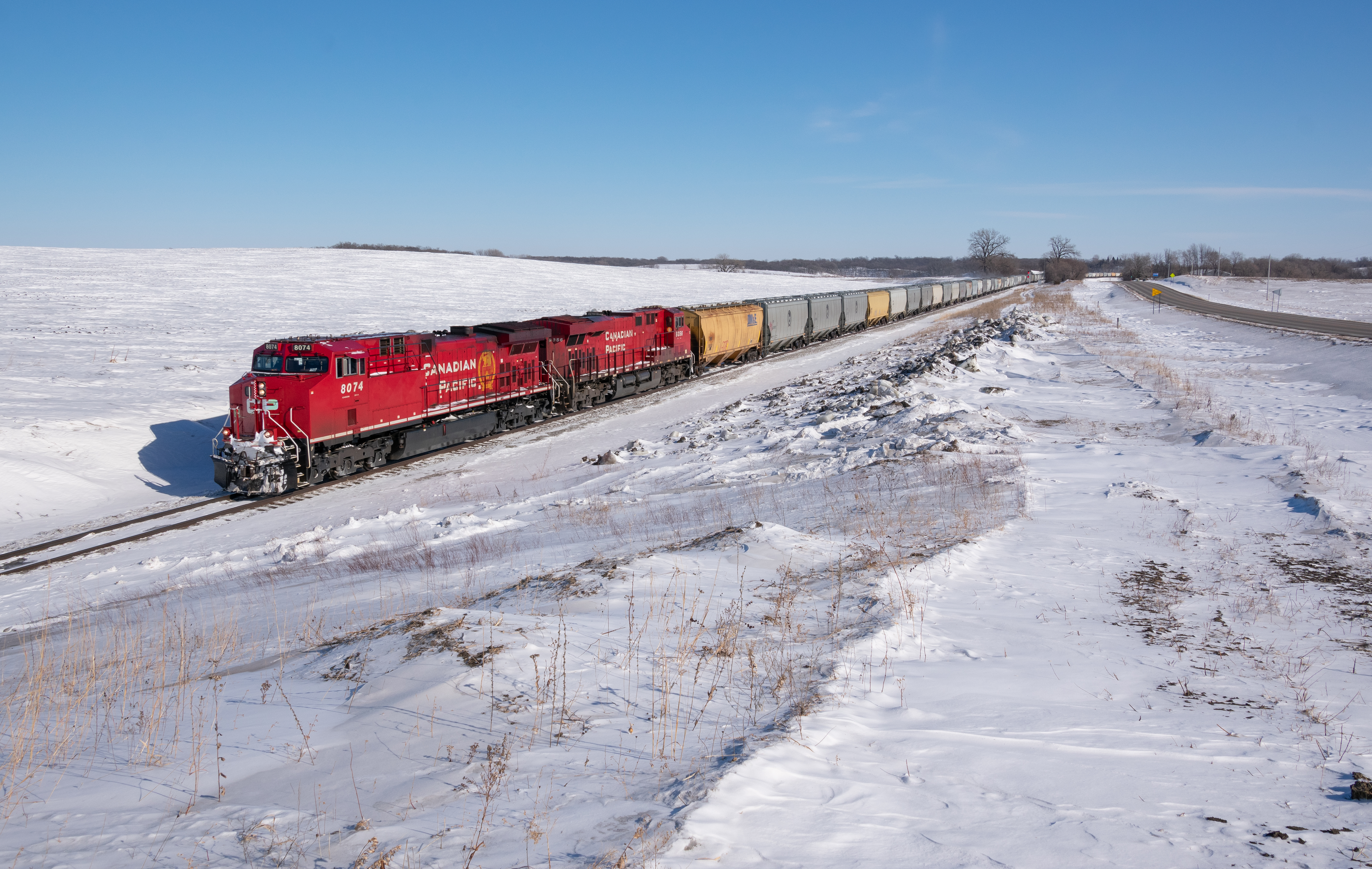
- A grain train heads west on the Elbow Lake Sub in Barrett, MN.

Overview
- Owner: Canadian Pacific Kansas City

Technical
- Line length: 137.3 mi (221.0 km)
- Track gauge: 1,435 mm (4 ft 8 1/2 in) standard gauge

The Elbow Lake Subdivision or Elbow Lake Sub is a railway line that runs about 137 miles (220 km) from Glenwood, Minnesota to Enderlin, North Dakota. The line is currently operated by CPKC Railway (CPKC) under its subsidiary, the Soo Line Railroad. The rail line began construction in 1887 and was a continuation of the Minneapolis and Pacific Railway line to the Dakotas that would supply grain to Twin Cities flour mills. The line begins in Glenwood and splits with the Detroit Lakes Subdivision before going through many small towns and reaching the junction with the Morris Subdivision near Nashua. The line continues westward into North Dakota, meeting the Veblen Subdivision at Veblen Junction. At Hankinson, the route meets the DMVW Dakota Subdivision and turns north, eventually reaching the western terminus at Enderlin.

There has been no passenger service on the line since the last train of the Winnipeger went through on March 25, 1967. Freight traffic mainly involves grain, crude oil, and intermodal as well as a few manifests. The route typically sees around 8 trains per day as of June 2017.

At Glenwood, the line connects to the Paynesville Subdivision to Minneapolis and the Detroit Lakes Subdivision to Thief River Falls. At the west end in Enderlin, the route connects to the Carrington Subdivision to Harvey, North Dakota. The line also connects to the Veblen Subdivision at Veblen Junction near Fairmount.

On June 20, 2025, 33 cars on a train were derailed by an EF5 tornado near Enderlin, North Dakota.
