= Camden, Minneapolis =

Community of Minneapolis

Coordinates: 45.0363°N 93.2980°W

Camden
- Community
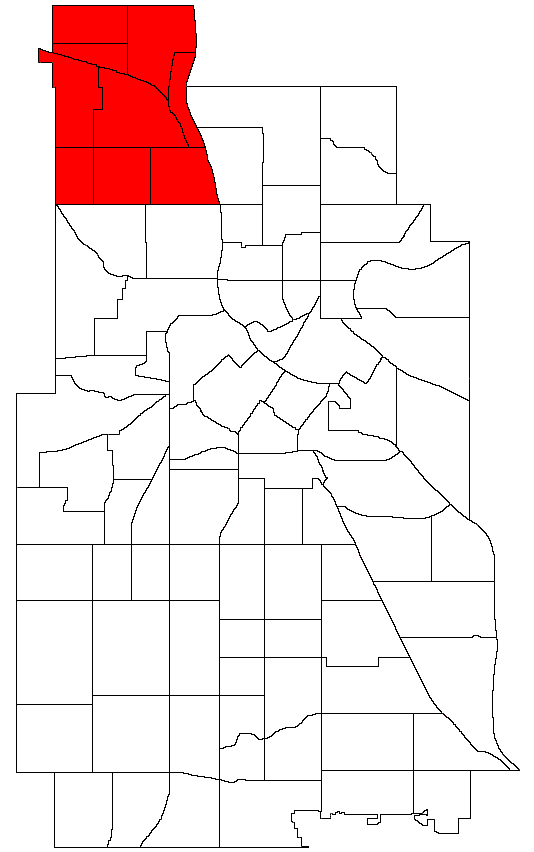
- Location of Camden within the U.S. city of Minneapolis
- Interactive map of Camden
- Country: United States
- State: Minnesota
- Counties: Hennepin
- City Council Ward: 4
- Neighborhoods: List: Camden Industrial Area, Minneapolis; Cleveland; Folwell; Humboldt Industrial Area; Lind-Bohanon; McKinley; Shingle Creek; Victory; Webber-Camden

Government
  - Council Member: LaTrisha Vetaw

Area
  - Total: 4.992 sq mi (12.93 km^{2})

Population (2020)
  - Total: 31,298
  - Density: 6,270/sq mi (2,421/km^{2})
- Time zone: UTC-6 (CST)
  - Summer (DST): UTC-5 (CDT)
- ZIP code: 55411, 55412, 55430
- Area code: 612

Camden is a community in Minneapolis, covering the upper half of the north side. Its boundaries are 53rd Avenue North to the north, the Mississippi River to the east, Lowry Avenue North to the south, and Xerxes Avenue North to the west. It is located in Ward 4 of the Minneapolis City Council, represented by council member LaTrisha Vetaw.

The community is composed of seven smaller neighborhoods. It also contains the Camden Industrial Area and the Humboldt Industrial Area, which are distinct and not within any other neighborhood. The Camden and Lowry Avenue bridges spans the Mississippi River to connect Camden and Northeast Minneapolis.

The combination of Near North and Camden is often referred to collectively as North Minneapolis.

== Official neighborhoods in the Camden community ==
- Camden Industrial Area
- Cleveland
- Folwell
- Humboldt Industrial Area
- Lind-Bohanon
- McKinley
- Shingle Creek
- Victory
- Webber-Camden

== Demographic Characteristics ==
Historical population
Census	Pop.	Note	%±
1980	29,652		—
1990	28,776		−3.0%
2000	31,698		10.2%
2010	28,778		−9.2%
2020	31,298		8.8%

According to the 2000 Minneapolis Census provided by Hennepin County, the Camden community was home to approximately 31,250 residents. When compared with the Twin Cities Metro as a whole (87% Caucasian), ethnic diversity was well represented in the area (42% Caucasian, 34% African-American, 15% Asian, 5% Hispanic, 4% Other). Although the average Camden household income was nearly $20,000 less than the Twin Cities average ($53,144 Camden, $73,178 Twin Cities), 77% of homes in Camden were owner occupied. Only 16% of area residents held a bachelor's degree or higher (compared with Twin Cities average of 27%), and 13% lived at or below the poverty line (compared with Twin Cities average of 5%). 34% of households had children under the age of 18.
