= Counties Transit Improvement Board =

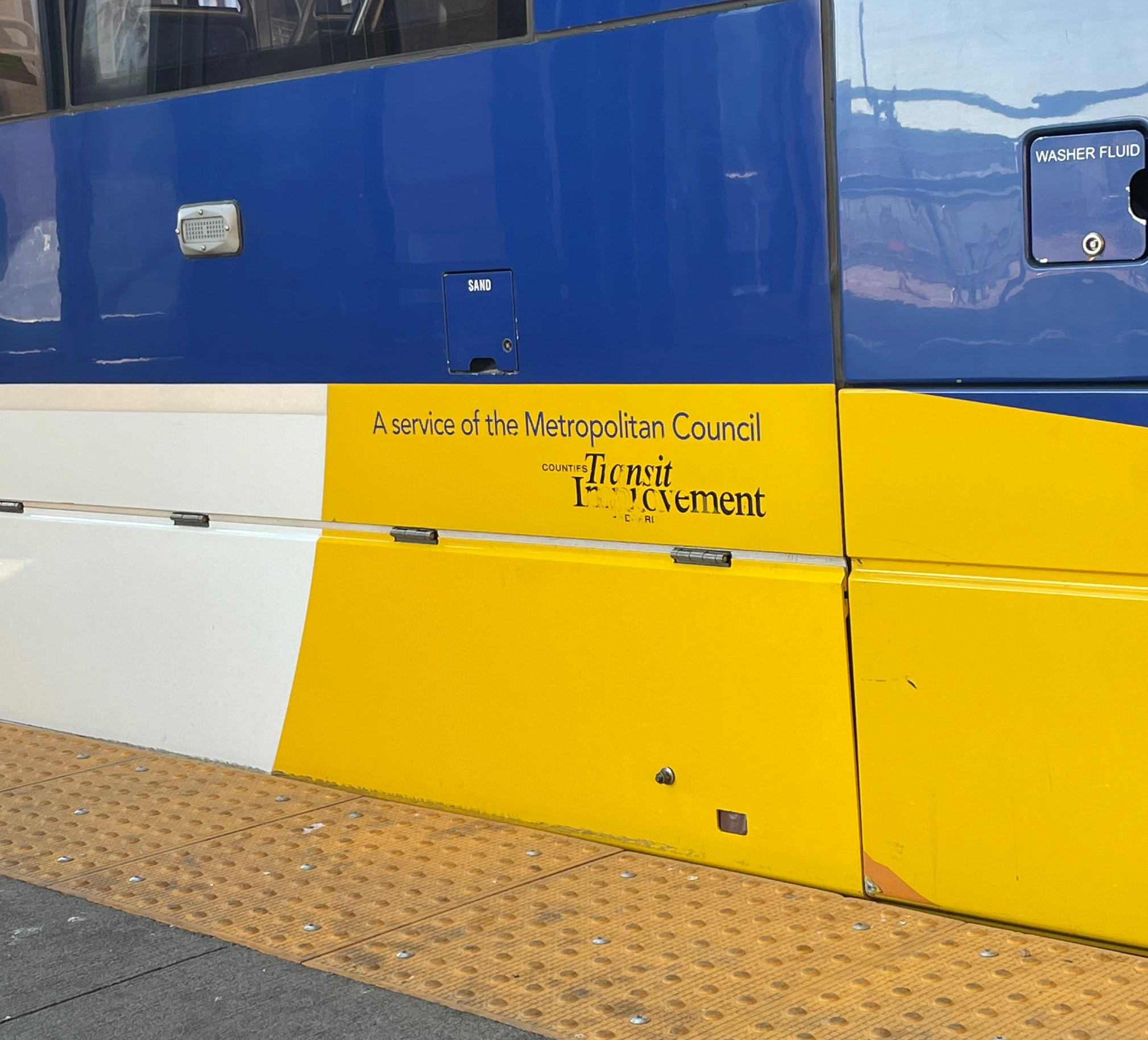
The remnants of the logo of the Counties Transit Improvement Board on a Metro Transit LRT vehicle in 2022.

The Counties Transit Improvement Board (CTIB) was a Joint Powers Board established in March 2008 which controlled an estimated $100 million annually in transit funds for the Minneapolis–St. Paul metropolitan area. The board was responsible for granting the funds under its control to major transit infrastructure projects around the Twin Cities. In 2016-2017 a series of events led to the formal vote by members of the CTIB to dissolve the board effective September, 2017. Individual counties then developed county level transit taxes to replace funding streams that had been allocated by the CTIB.

== Creation ==
Minnesota State House File 2800, introduced on February 12, 2008, proposed a 0.5% sales tax for the seven counties that make up the Minneapolis–St. Paul Urbanized Area: Hennepin, Ramsey, Dakota, Anoka, Washington, Carver, and Scott counties. This tax was to be divided equally among transit and highway projects. In further engrossments, the tax was reduced to 0.25% and the highway funding was removed, leaving a dedicated transit tax. The state legislation, which required each county board to both pass the tax and join a Joint Powers Board with the other counties that passed the tax, was passed on February 21, 2008 in the House and the same day in the Senate (as SF 2521). The bill was vetoed by Governor Tim Pawlenty on February 22, and overridden by both houses of the legislature on February 25.

After the legislation was passed, each county board was required to vote whether or not to enact the tax and join the joint powers Counties Transit Improvement Board. On March 25 Anoka County and Ramsey County both voted to join the Board, thus fulfilling the legislative requirement that at least two counties enact the tax in order to create the Board. On the same day, Carver County voted not to join the board. A week later, on April 1 Dakota, Hennepin, and Washington counties voted to enact the sales tax and join the Board as well, while Scott County voted not to join. Though Scott and Carver counties are not currently members of the board, they may join at a later date if they so choose in the future.

== Purpose, Powers, and Authority ==
According to the enabling legislation, the purpose of the CTIB was to collect the transit tax funds collected in member counties, and to grant those funds to capital transit projects in the Twin Cities area. The CTIB has independent bonding authority, secured by future revenues of the transit tax, and all counties that join the Board are legally bound to keep collecting revenues if they choose to leave the board, until all obligations made while they were members are repaid. The Board was also allowed to secure bonding in excess of its revenues if it does so in cooperation with member counties who choose to use their bonding authority to fund CTIB projects.

The Board may fund any project it chooses, so long as it was within the taxing district, is consistent with the regional long-range transit plan established by the Metropolitan Council, and does not infringe upon any small county's minimum funding guarantee, which guarantees that any member county which contributes less than 3% of the board's funding was guaranteed to receive at least 3% of grant funding awarded. This last clause appears to be moot at least for now, since neither Scott nor Carver counties enacted the tax, and the remaining five counties should all be large enough to exceed the minimum funding guarantee.

The board's membership includes representatives of each member county as well as a representative of the Metropolitan Council, which is the umbrella organization for all Twin Cities-area transit. The Metro-area counties have minimal power on the Metropolitan Council, much of which was appointed directly by the governor, and when the seven counties met to draw up the Joint Powers Agreement to create the CTIB, they chose to give the Metropolitan Council only 5 votes on the CTIB, reserving the remaining 95 votes to be divided among the member counties proportionally according to the mean of population and tax-revenue percentages.
