= Monticello Subdivision =

Railway line in Minnesota

The Monticello Subdivision or Monticello Sub is a railway branch line that runs from the Wayzata Subdivision in Minneapolis to Monticello, Minnesota. Formerly operated by the Great Northern Railway and then Burlington Northern, it is now operated by BNSF Railway. It largely runs parallel to Broadway and Hennepin County Road 81 from Minneapolis to Rogers, and then Interstate 94 from Rogers to Monticello. Rails formerly continued on from today's Monticello Subdivision farther to the northwest along today's I-94 corridor all the way to Moorhead, Minnesota. It had been used for passenger service, such as with the Alexandrian (named for Alexandria, Minnesota).

This is a low-volume line, only seeing about two trains a week. Most rail activity on the line takes place south of Albertville. Farther north, the main purpose of the line used to be to serve the Monticello Nuclear Generating Plant. The part of the line through Monticello sees maintenance around every 10 or more years, to keep the line open just in case they need to run loads to the Nuclear plant. There hasn’t been a run to the Nuclear plant in quite a few years now, but back in what I think was in the years of 2017-2020 the part through Monticello got maintenance on the tracks with weeds cut down and trees over the tracks taken off the tracks. Now the track through Monticello is listed as exempt, and the line between Monticello and Albertville is used to store empty grain hoppers and container cars. Union Pacific Railroad has trackage rights on the line from its southern end at Lyndale Junction to MW Junction, which connects to UP's Golden Valley Industrial Lead. In the peak construction period, the corridor sees a seasonal unit train ran by BNSF , which serve the Grupo Cementos de Chihuahua (GCC) terminal located in Otsego off of I-94. The movement mainly involves cement being transported to the terminal, with the unit trains made up of two-bay covered hoppers.

The Metro Blue Line Extension, in early planning stages as a light rail line, proposes using part of the Monticello Subdivision corridor to run passenger trains. Railway operator BNSF has consistently opposed any passenger rail along this corridor.
