= Humboldt Industrial Area, Minneapolis =

Neighborhood in Minneapolis

Coordinates: 45.042118406°N 93.307767473°W

Humboldt Industrial Area
- Neighborhood
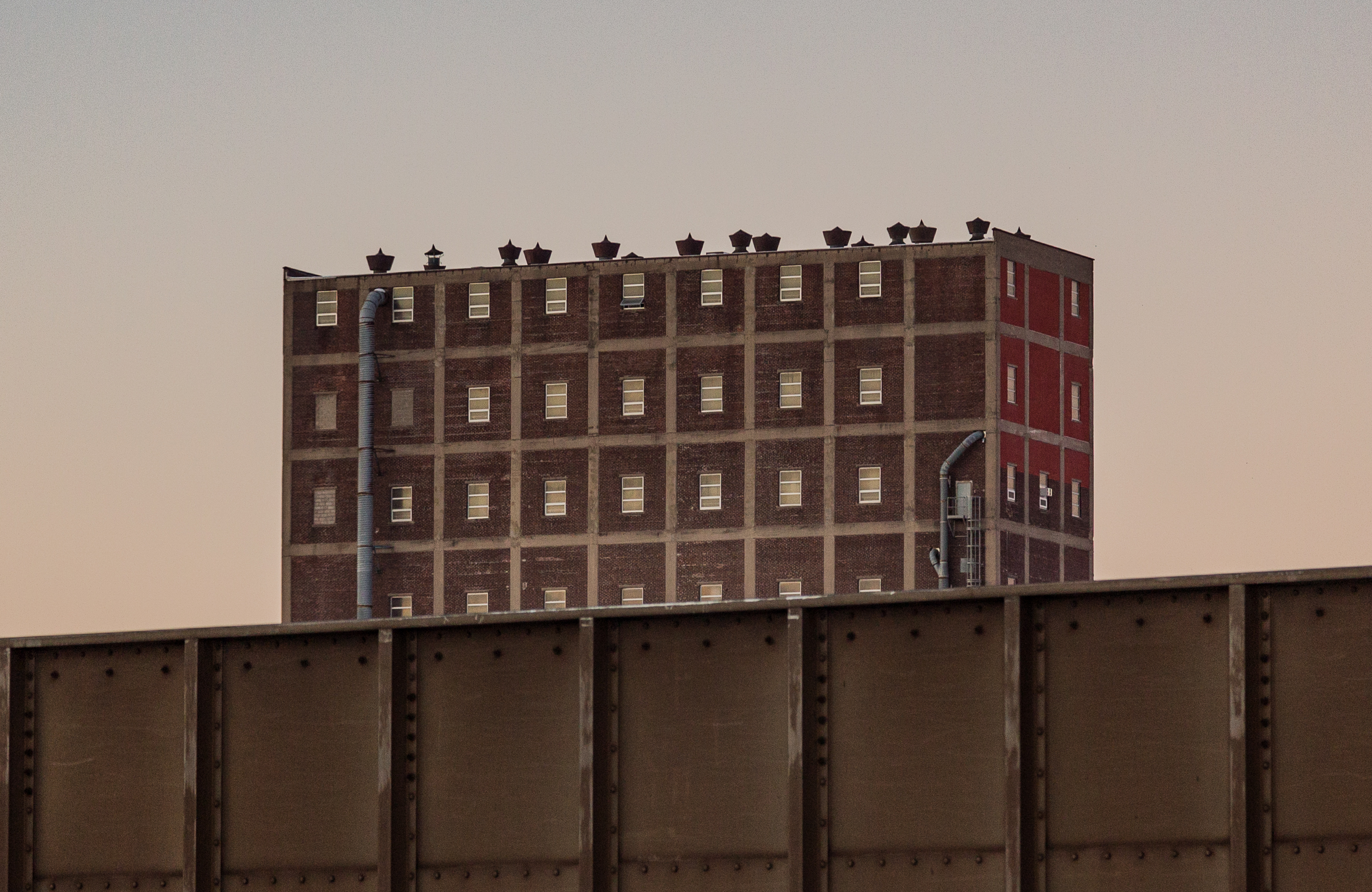
- A train in Humboldt Yard passes by the SOO Line terminal elevator.
- Nickname: HIA
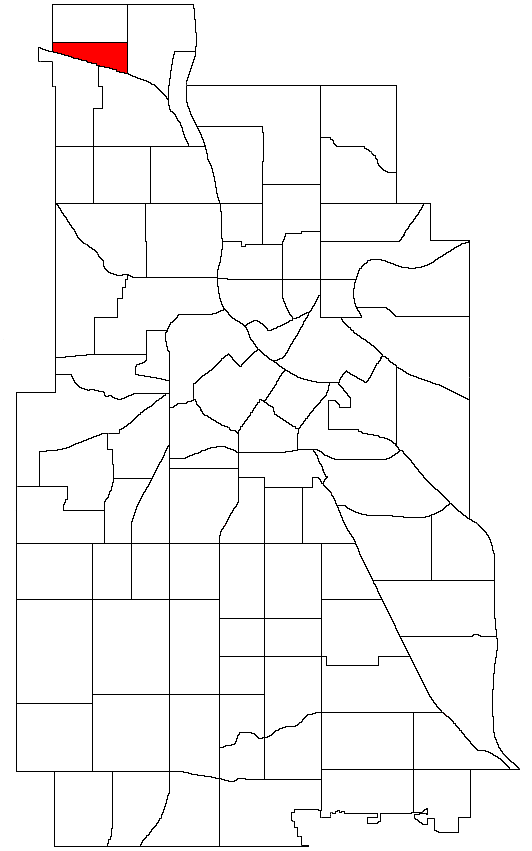
- Location of Humboldt Industrial Area within Minneapolis
- Interactive map of Humboldt Industrial Area
- Country: United States
- State: Minnesota
- County: Hennepin
- City: Minneapolis
- Community: Camden
- City Council Ward: 4

Government

Population (2025)
  - Total: 0
- Time zone: UTC-6 (CST)
  - Summer (DST): UTC-5 (CDT)
- ZIP code: 55401, 55413, 55414
- Area code: 612

Humboldt Industrial Area is an official neighborhood in the Camden community of Minneapolis. It shares a border with Robbinsdale to the west and is located roughly between Ryan and Shingle creeks to the north, Humboldt Yard railway tracks to the south, and North Humboldt Avenue to the east. The neighborhood is an industrial park with no official residents, though activities at the area have impact on surrounding residential neighborhoods.

== History ==
The neighborhood is located in Minneapolis City Council Ward 4, currently represented by Minneapolis City Council member LaTrisha Vetaw. It is officially designated as an industrial employment district with total employment of approximately 500 people. The area features a granary, a railway yard, and several manufacturing and other industrial facilities. The area does not have any official residents, which can result in misleading statistics about crime incidence. North Humboldt Avenue, which forms the east border of the area, is named after Alexander von Humboldt.

=== Pollution and potential redevelopment ===
Ryan Creek originally ran through part of the area, but it was relocated between 1965 and 1971. Several berms and water retention features were constructed following industrial accidents that led to soil and groundwater contamination. Undeveloped portions of the area have been subject to illegal dumping and vandalism. Although air quality has been a concern for nearby residents, a 2001 study found that emissions in Humboldt and other Camden community industrial areas from CO, NO_{2}, and SO_{2} were within acceptable human health limits and below national standards, but industries posed a significant risk for spills or other toxic releases.

A substantial portion of the area is brownfields and superfund sites. The legacy of toxic industrial pollution at the area is featured in Katheryn Savage’s nonfiction book Groundglass released in 2022. Public money has supported some clean up efforts at the area. Nearby residents in Shingle Creek, a historically African-American neighborhood, have envisioned redesign plans for the area to expand green space, reduce pollution and traffic congestion, and improve connectivity with bicycle and pedestrian pathways. New development adjacent to the Humboldt Greenway has also resulted in nearby communities seeking to improve relationships with industry to create more community-oriented public spaces.

== Notable features ==
=== SOO Line terminal elevator ===
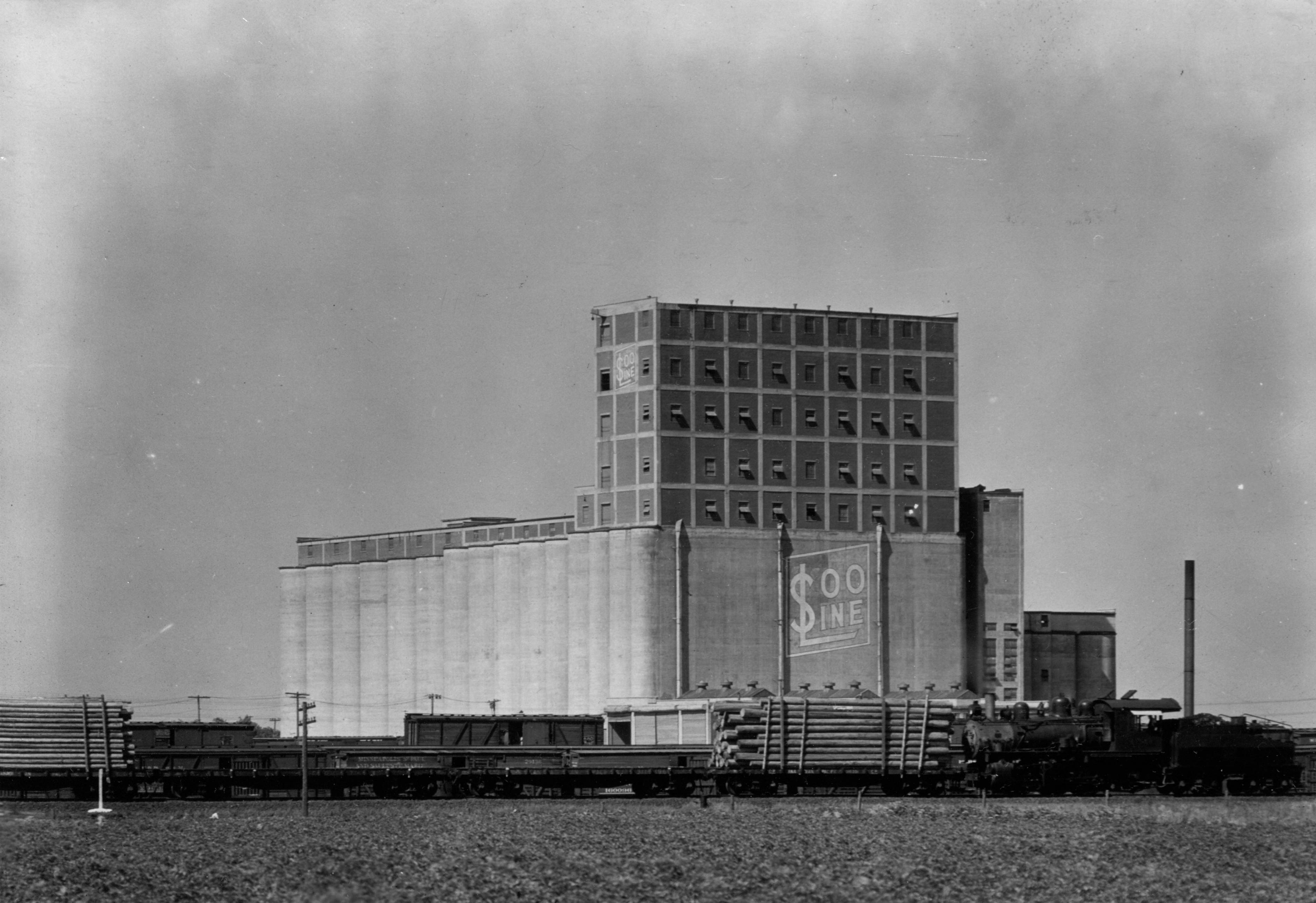
The Soo Line terminal elevator in 1926.

The Soo Line terminal elevator on 49th Avenue North was constructed between 1923 and 1925 by the Thompson–Starrett Company. It features several concrete silos and a brick head house. The active elevator is located adjacent to Humboldt Yards. Formerly an ADM facility, the granary is an oat receiving facility now owned by General Mills.

=== Humboldt Yard ===
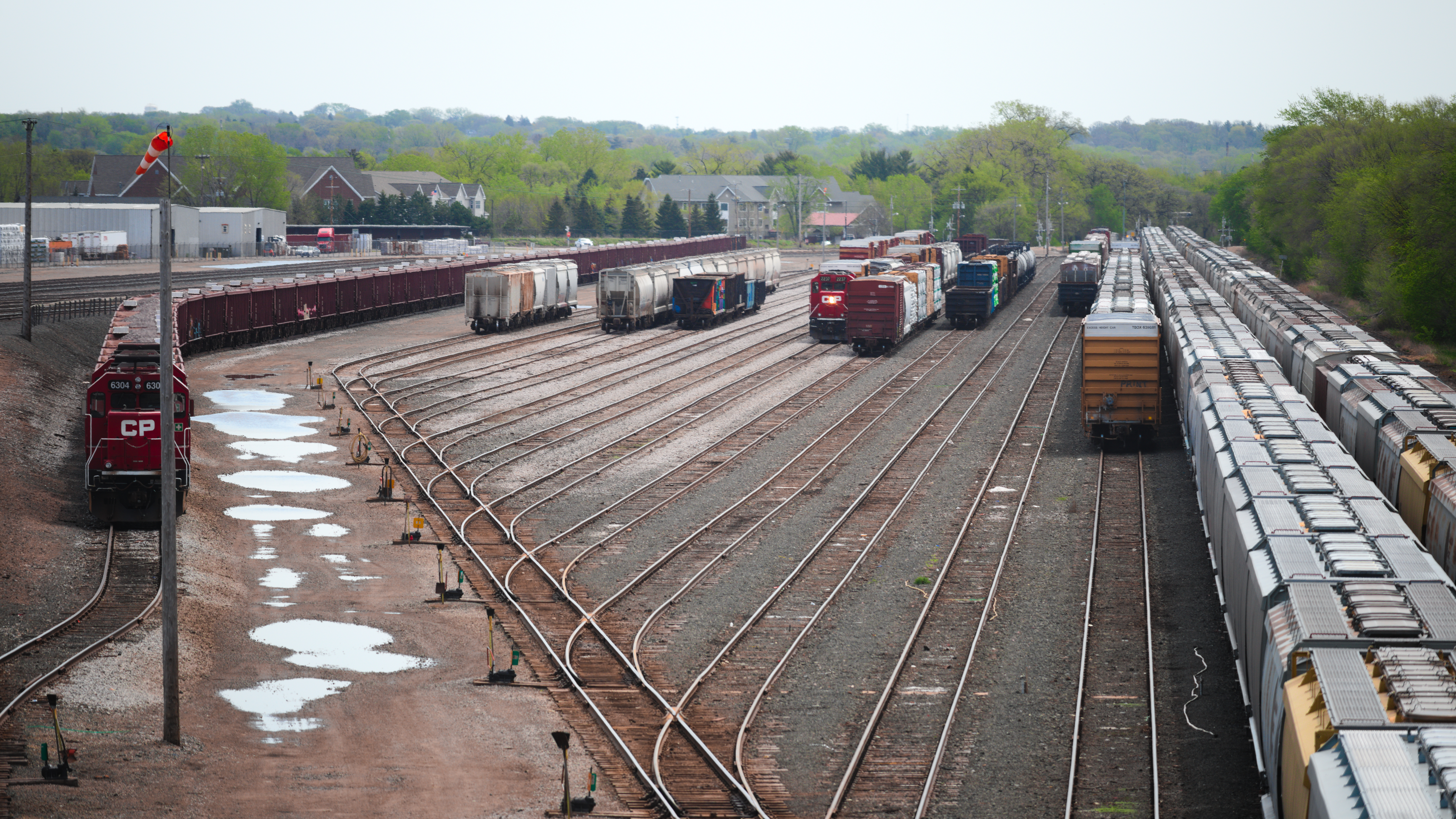
Humboldt Yard, part of the Paynesville Subdivision, in 2022.

Humboldt Yard is located west of North Humboldt Avenue and south of 49th Avenue. It is part of the Payneville Subdivision of the SOO Line Railroad. The switching yard has been in operation since at least 1938 and makes up the largest use of the industrial area. Along with Shoreham, Humboldt Yard is one of the largest rail yards in Hennepin County. The two are owned by Canadian Pacific and responsible for six million tons of freight annually. Humboldt is primarily a switching and translating yard for plastics, forest products, and other aggregate materials. The yard features 28 tracks for a capacity of 1,400 cars. In 1992 and 1993, the General Electric shops at the yard rebuilt the Milwaukee Road 261 engine.

== See also ==
- Canadian Pacific Camden Place Rail Bridge
- Economy of Minnesota
- List of rail yards
- North Minneapolis
