= Lind-Bohanon, Minneapolis =

Coordinates: 45.044°N 93.292°W

Lind-Bohanon
- Neighborhood
- Lind-Bohanon, Minneapolis, Minnesota sign

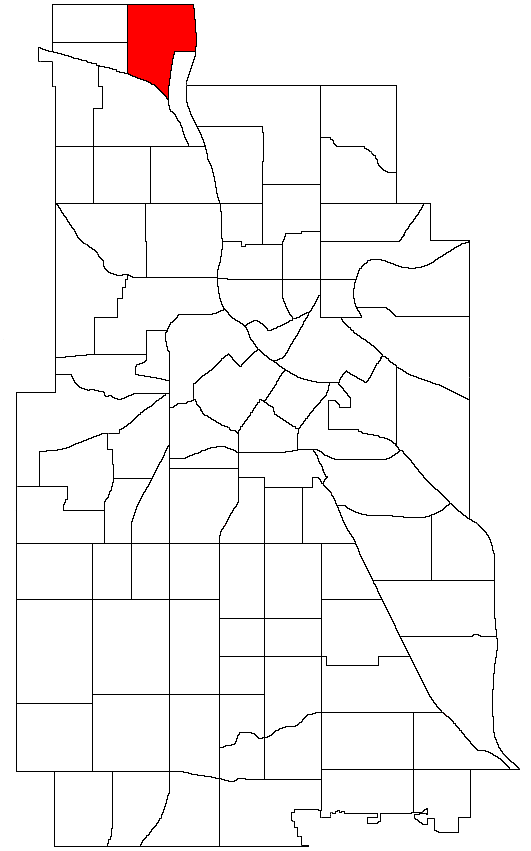
- Location of Lind-Bohanon within the U.S. city of Minneapolis
- Interactive map of Lind-Bohanon
- Country: United States
- State: Minnesota
- County: Hennepin
- City: Minneapolis
- Community: Camden
- City Council Ward: 4

Government
  - Council Member: LaTrisha Vetaw

Area
  - Total: 0.798 sq mi (2.07 km^{2})

Population (2020)
  - Total: 5,175
  - Density: 6,480/sq mi (2,500/km^{2})
- Time zone: UTC-6 (CST)
  - Summer (DST): UTC-5 (CDT)
- ZIP code: 55412, 55430
- Area code: 612

Historical population
Census	Pop.	Note	%±
1980	4,932		—
1990	4,449		−9.8%
2000	4,401		−1.1%
2010	4,569		3.8%
2020	5,175		13.3%

Lind-Bohanon is a northern neighborhood within the Camden community in Minneapolis. It is located in Ward 4, represented by council member LaTrisha Vetaw.

== Boundaries ==
The neighborhood's southern boundary is the Canadian Pacific Railway and Webber Parkway. Humboldt Avenue North and Shingle Creek, Minneapolis marks its border to the west. Its eastern boundary runs from north to south as follows: along the Mississippi River from 53rd Avenue North to 48th Avenue North, and then along Lyndale Avenue North from 48th Avenue to the Canadian Pacific Railway. 53rd Avenue North and Brooklyn Center, MN border Lind-Bohanon to the north.

== Demographics ==
Race/ethnicity
Race/ethnicity	2000		2010		2020	
Race/ethnicity	Number	%	Number	%	Number	%
White alone	2,629	59.74	2,071	45.33	1,807	35.01
Black alone	760	17.27	1,332	29.15	1,633	31.64
Hispanic or Latino (any race)	231	5.25	348	7.62	538	10.42
Native American alone	90	2.04	91	1.99	73	1.41
Asian alone	507	11.52	488	10.68	655	12.69
Other race alone	13	0.30	7	0.15	43	0.83
Pacific Islander alone	4	0.09	0	0.00	0	0.00
Two or more races	167	3.79	232	5.08	413	8.00
Total	4,401	100.0	4,569	100.0	5,162	100.0

== Parks and Recreation ==
Centered in Lind-Bohanon is Bohanon Park. The North Mississippi Regional Park is a Minneapolis Park and Recreation Park. It lies along the western bank of the Mississippi River connecting Lind-Bohanon to the trails and paths of the Grand Rounds Scenic Byway and Anoka County parks and trails. The NMRP is home to the Carl Kroening Interpretive Center where naturalists give tours about the history and current state of the Mississippi River.

== Humboldt Greenway ==
The Humboldt Greenway is a neighborhood revitalization program on Lind-Bohanon's western border. More than 200 World War II houses and local businesses were razed and replaced with newer single family homes, multifamily townhomes, Shingle Creek Commons apartments for seniors and Kingsley Commons apartments for the MS-afflicted.

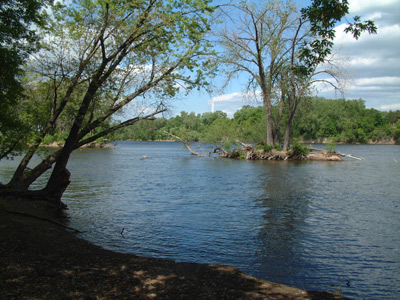
North Mississippi Regional Park

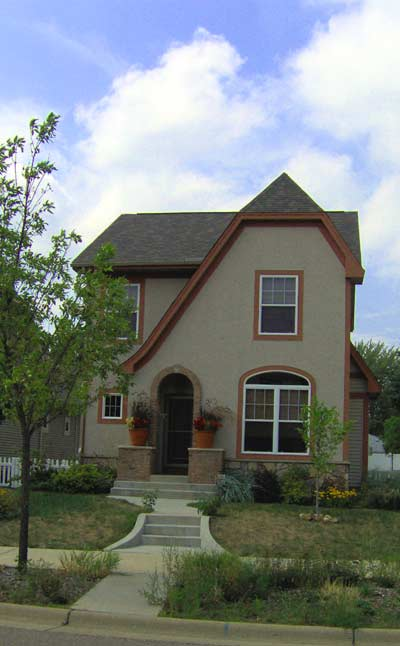
Humboldt Greenway
