= Shady Oak station =

American light rail station

Shady Oak
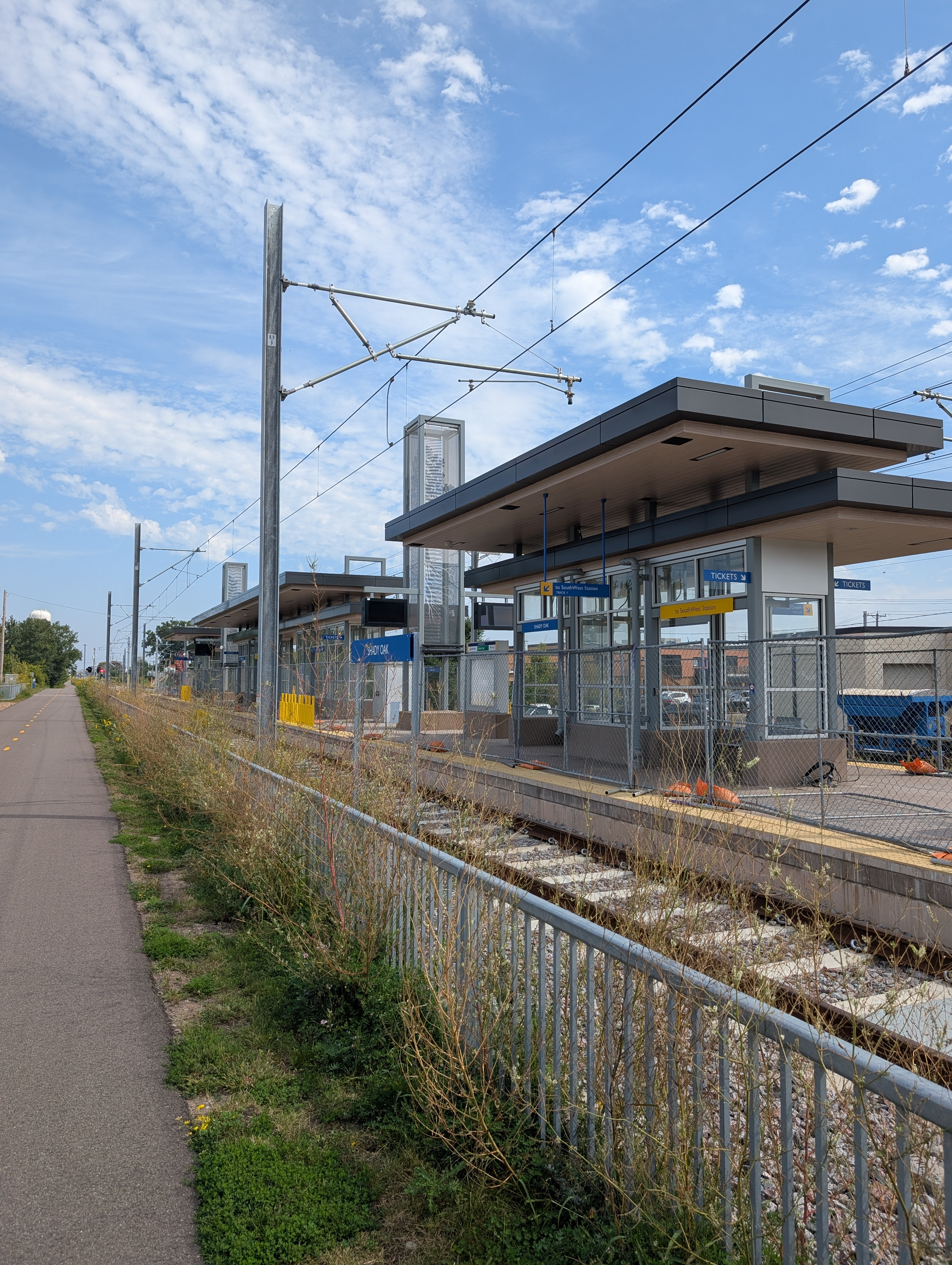

General information
- Location: Hopkins, MN
- Coordinates: 44.91777°N 93.42082°W
- System: Metro light rail station
- Owner: Metro Transit
- Line: Green Line Extension (2027)
- Platforms: 1 island platform
- Tracks: 2

Construction
- Parking: Yes
- Accessible: Yes

History
- Opening: 2027

Services
Future service
Preceding station	Metro	Following station
Opus toward SouthWest Station	Green Line Extension	Downtown Hopkins toward Target Field
Location

Shady Oak station is a planned light rail station under construction in Hopkins, Minnesota on the Metro Green Line Extension. It is located near the Hopkins and Minnetonka border and will be the westernmost station in Hopkins. This station is expected to bring development to the surrounding area, which is currently an industrial area.
