= Golden Triangle station =

Golden Triangle
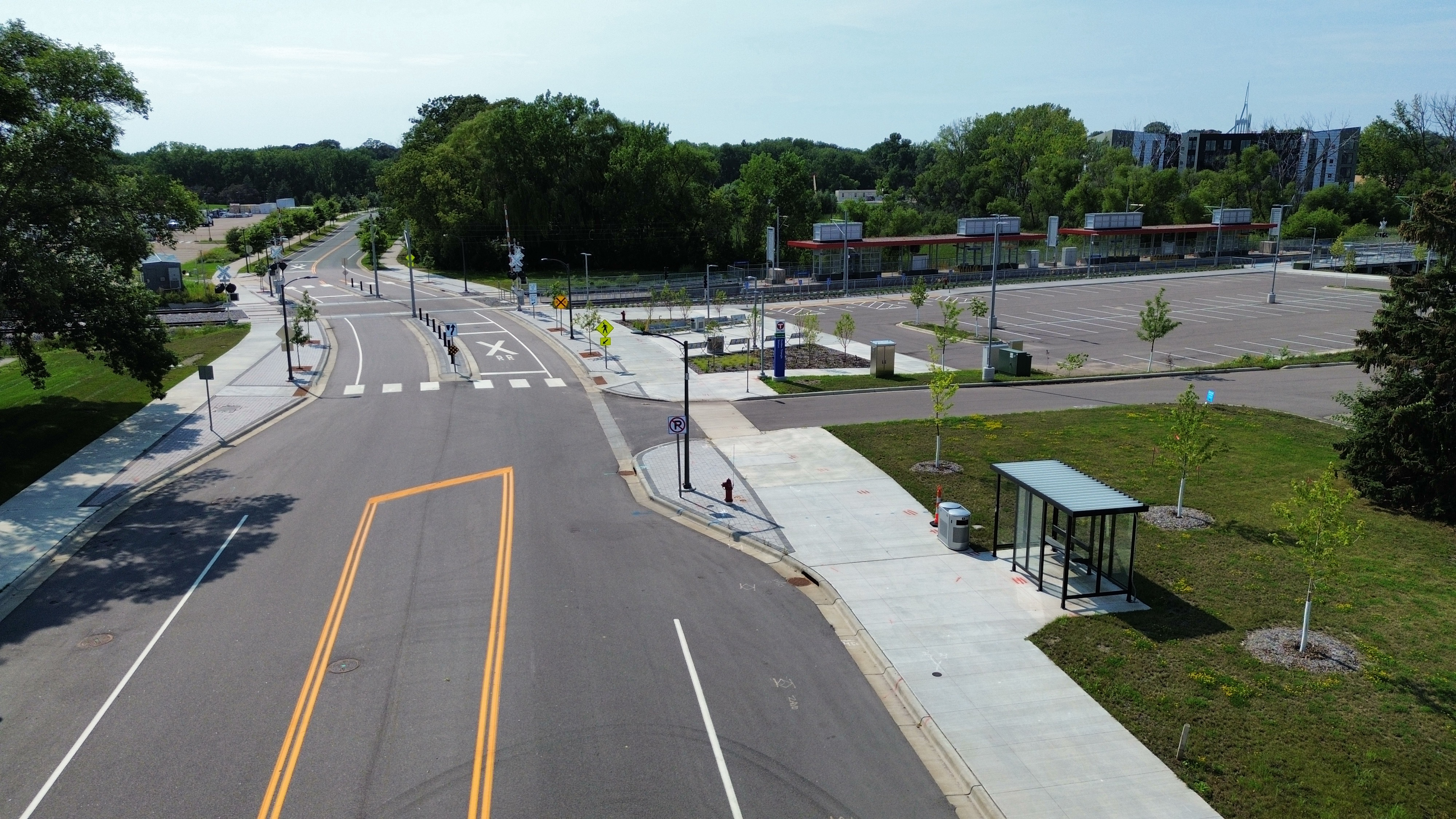
- Golden Triangle Station with bus stops and shelter in Eden Prairie, Minnesota

General information
- Location: Eden Prairie, MN
- Coordinates: 44.877083°N 93.410492°W
- System: Metro light rail station
- Owner: Metro Transit
- Line: Green Line Extension (2027)
- Tracks: 2

Construction
- Parking: Yes
- Accessible: Yes

History
- Opening: 2027

Services
Future service
Preceding station	Metro	Following station
Eden Prairie Town Center toward SouthWest Station	Green Line Extension	City West toward Target Field
Location

Golden Triangle station is one of four light rail stations planned in Eden Prairie, Minnesota on the Metro Green Line Extension. The Golden Triangle Station will be near the Performing Institute of Minnesota Arts High School and the station is positioned west of U.S. 169, east of U.S. Route 212 and north of I-494.

The "Golden Triangle" area surrounding the station is considered a regional employment center with more than 20,000 jobs and nearly 10 million square feet of industrial and office space. Housing is also being built within the area. The ability of light rail to improve transit access to jobs in the region was seen as a benefit for building the Green Line extension. SouthWest Transit will provide on-demand rides via autonomous vehicles to help solve the last mile portion of the journey.

In 2015, the Metropolitan Council evaluated ending the Green Line Extension at Golden Triangle Station in a cost-saving measure. While the ending of the line continued past the Golden Triangle station, the size of the park-and-ride was shrunk as a proposed cost saving measure.
