= Downtown Hopkins station =

Minnesota light rail station, under construction

Downtown Hopkins
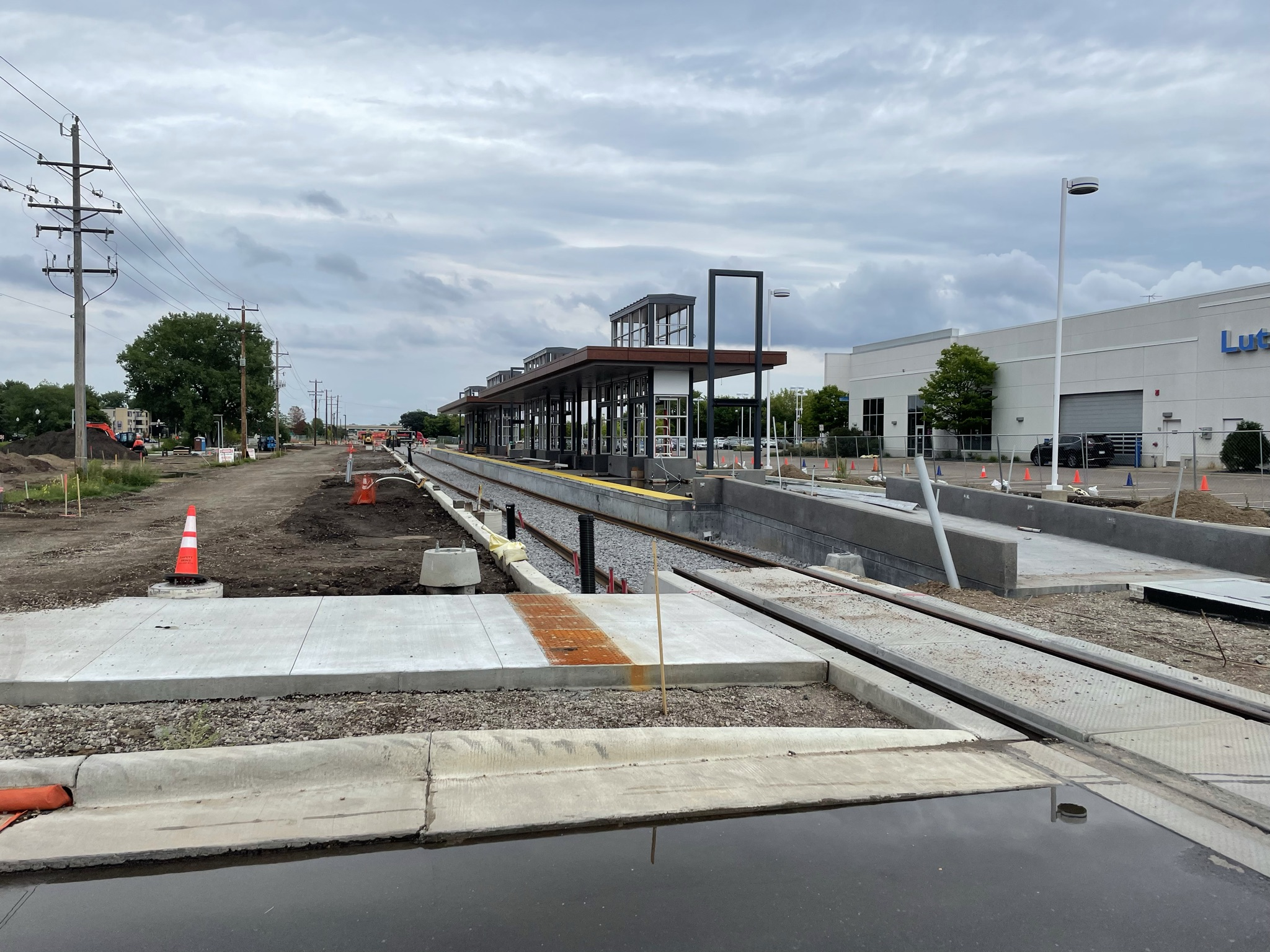
- An under construction Downtown Hopkins station in 2021.

General information
- Location: Minnetonka, MN
- Coordinates: 44.921352°N 93.408754°W
- System: Metro light rail station
- Owner: Metro Transit
- Line: Green Line Extension (2027)
- Tracks: 2

Construction
- Parking: Yes
- Accessible: Yes

History
- Opening: 2027

Services
Preceding station	Metro	Following station
Future service
Shady Oak toward SouthWest Station	Green Line Extension	Blake Road toward Target Field
Location

Downtown Hopkins station is an under construction light rail station in Hopkins, Minnesota on the Metro Green Line Extension. The station, one of three located in Hopkins, is located just adjacent to Excelsior Blvd or Hennepin County Road 3. Downtown Hopkins is about a five-minute walk away or .25 miles (0.40 km).

The station will include a public plaza, connections to Cedar Lake Trail, and an adjacent bus stop. The city of Hopkins plans to encourage transit supportive development nearby including 4-5 story residential buildings. The city of Hopkins, SuperValu, and a Honda dealership are major employers nearby. Although opening of the project was years away, the light rail line helped attract development including a $50 million apartment building close to the Downtown Hopkins station.

The American Planning Association named The Artery, a street connecting the station to downtown Hopkins as a "Great Street" in 2019. The Artery covers a two block portion of Eighth Avenue. A trial in 2015 added art and a two-way bike lane with the final design opening in 2018. Funding for the $5.5 million project was provided by Hennepin County, Three Rivers Park District, and the Metropolitan Council via a transit-oriented development grant.

The Metropolitan Council helped support The Artery project with grants. It also helped fund a nearby apartment building that will have a park-and-ride for riders.
