= City West station (Minnesota) =

Planned light rail station in Minnesota, US

City West
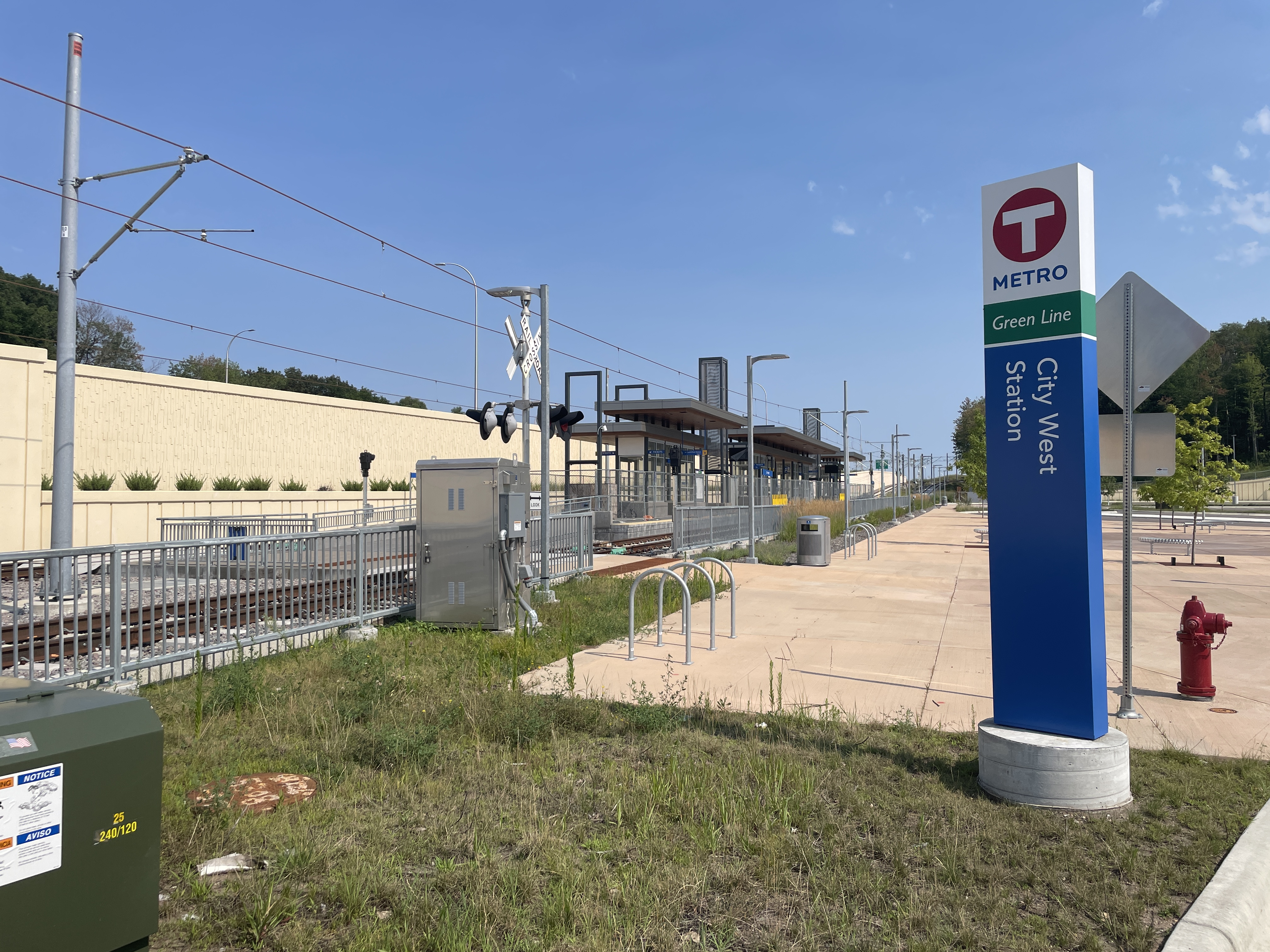
- City West station platform.

General information
- Location: Eden Prairie, MN
- Coordinates: 44.8905°N 93.4109°W
- System: Metro light rail station
- Owner: Metro Transit
- Line: Green Line Extension (2027)
- Tracks: 2

Construction
- Parking: Yes
- Accessible: Yes

History
- Opening: 2027

Services
Future service
Preceding station	Metro	Following station
Golden Triangle toward SouthWest Station	Green Line Extension	Opus toward Target Field
Location

City West station is one of four light rail stations planned in Eden Prairie, Minnesota, on the Metro Green Line Extension. The City West Station will be near the corporate campus for Optum, and the station is positioned west of U.S. Route 212 and south of Minnesota State Highway 62.

The station will have a park-and-ride lot. When Eden Prairie approved construction of the station in 2014, the city requested a trail extending from the station to Shady Oak Road.

The City West station is near Optum's corporate campus which is expected to eventually have 6,500 jobs. United Health Group, of which Optum is a subsidiary, donated land for the station.
