= Eden Prairie Town Center station =

Planned light rail station in Minnesota

Eden Prairie Town Center
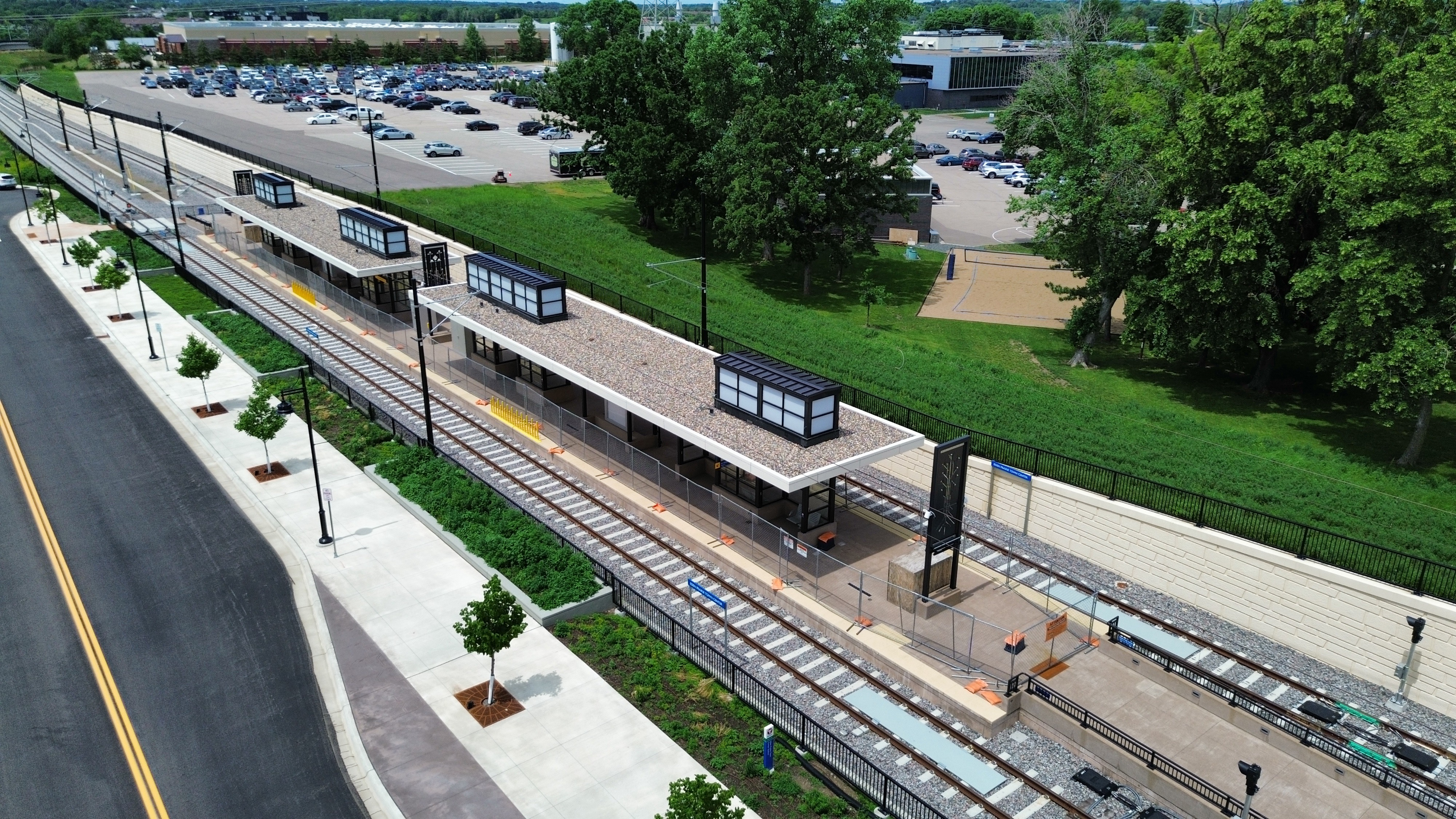
- The Eden Prairie Town Center station in 2024 is mostly constructed but the Green Line extension isn't expected to open until 2027.

General information
- Location: Eden Prairie, MN
- Coordinates: 44.859181°N 93.431013°W
- System: Metro light rail station
- Owner: Metro Transit
- Line: Green Line Extension (2027)
- Tracks: 2

Construction
- Accessible: Yes

History
- Opening: 2027

Services
Future service
Preceding station	Metro	Following station
SouthWest Station Terminus	Green Line Extension	Golden Triangle toward Target Field
Location

Eden Prairie Town Center station is one of four light rail stations planned in Eden Prairie, Minnesota on the Metro Green Line Extension. In 2015, the station was deferred as a part of budget cuts in the planning process for the Metro Green Line Extension. However in 2017, the city of Eden Prairie agreed to pay for the engineering design work for the station. The city of Eden Prairie officially received federal grant funding which enabled the station to be in the final construction plan for the Metro Green Line Extension. The station will be located near the Eden Prairie Center shopping center and south of the intersection of I-494 and U.S. Route 212.
