= Opus station =

Opus
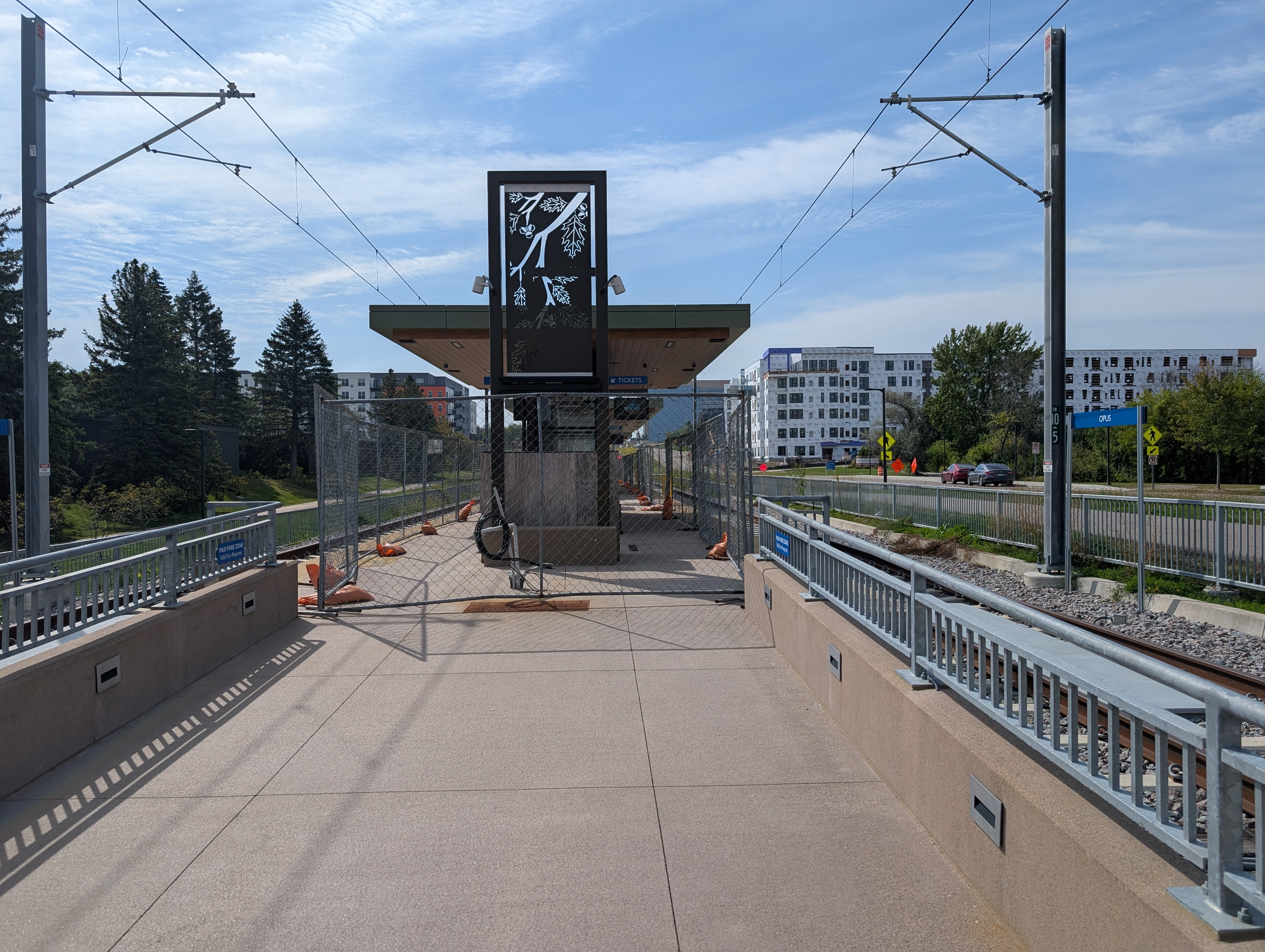

General information
- Location: Minnetonka, MN
- Coordinates: 44.898109°N 93.413906°W
- System: Metro light rail station
- Owner: Metro Transit
- Line: Green Line Extension (2027)
- Tracks: 2

Construction
- Parking: Yes
- Accessible: Yes

History
- Opening: 2027

Services
Future service
| Preceding station | Metro | Following station |
|---|---|---|
| City West toward SouthWest Station | Green Line Extension | Shady Oak toward Target Field |
Location

Opus station is a planned light rail station under construction in Minnetonka, Minnesota on the Metro Green Line Extension. It is located north of Minnesota State Highway 62 adjacent to the headquarters of The Opus Group, near the intersection of Bren Road and Green Circle Drive. The station's construction spurred residential development in the area prior to opening.
