= Metro Transit rolling stock =

The opening of the Metro Blue Line in 2004 marked the beginning of Metro Transit's expansion into rail transit, 50 years after the last Twin Cities Rapid Transit streetcars were taken out of service. Several new rail transit projects are either under construction or in planning stages and more are expected to be explored in the near future. Metro Transit will likely be acquiring a significant amount of rolling stock as these new projects move forward.

== Light rail ==
The Twin Cities region has two active light rail lines, the Blue Line, and the Green Line, and an extension to the Green Line is currently under construction. As of 2020, 64 light rail cars are in service and delivery of 27 additional cars is underway.

=== Type I LRVs ===
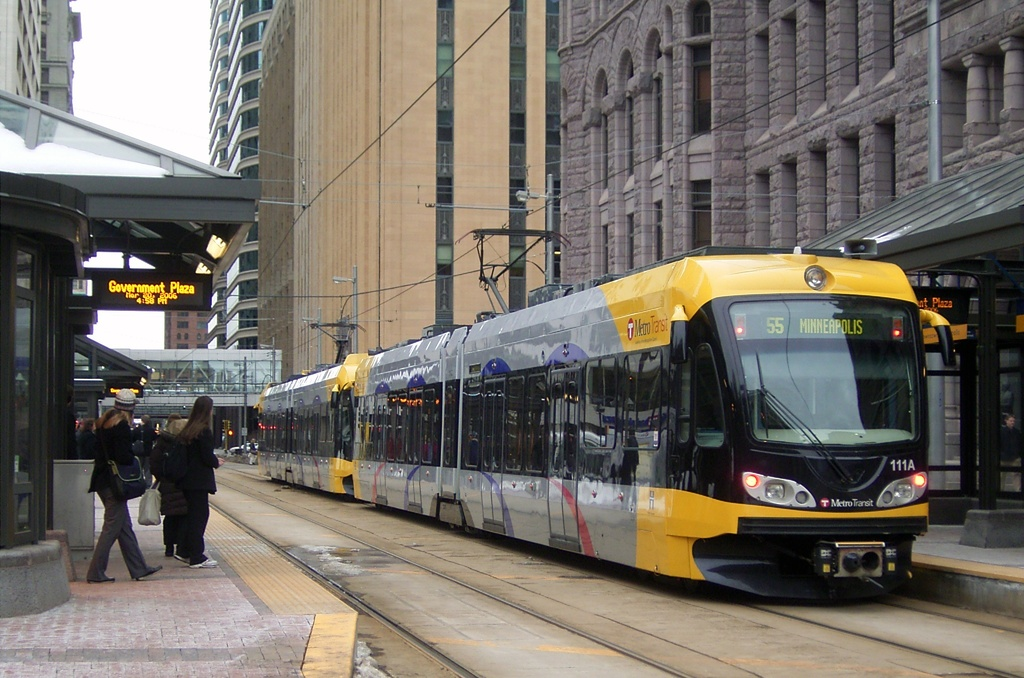
A two-car train of 100-series Bombardier Flexity Swift cars in Downtown Minneapolis

Metro Transit placed its order for light rail vehicles (LRVs) for the Blue Line with Bombardier in January 2001, originally for 18 cars, but increased in stages to 24 cars by early 2003. Bombardier constructed a full-scale, half-car mock-up of the Minneapolis version of its Flexity Swift design and this was placed on temporary display on a section of completed track on 5th Street, starting on October 30, 2002, to enable Metro Transit to give the city's residents a hands-on preview of the low-floor design several months before completion of the first actual rail cars. The articulated vehicles use a 70% low-floor design, are 94 ft (29 m) long and can carry 66 seated passengers and 180 standees.

The first light rail vehicle for the Blue Line arrived in Minneapolis in March 2003, and testing of it along the first completed section of the line was underway by June 2003. The line opened on June 26, 2004, with 14 of the 24 Bombardier Flexity Swift LRVs accepted and available for service by then, and all 24 had entered service by the end of the year. In January 2007, the Metropolitan Council announced that three additional vehicles would be purchased, for a total of 27 LRVs on the line.

The Blue Line's Type I LRVs are numbered sequentially from 101 through 127. The Flexity Swift vehicle is an articulated design with three car-body sections, referred to as the A, B and C sections. The markings on the ends of LRVs indicate the vehicle number and section. For example, car 114 is marked 114A on one end and 114B on the other end. Vehicle numbers are also displayed (excluding the section letter) on the sides of the C section, on the doors of the operator cabs and on the roof of the vehicle. Both ends of the vehicle have operator cabs, allowing trains of any length to be operated normally in either direction without the need to turn the train around. The pantograph is located on the B section of the vehicle. Auxiliary power unit, traction inverter, traction motor are supplied by Toshiba.

=== Type II LRVs ===
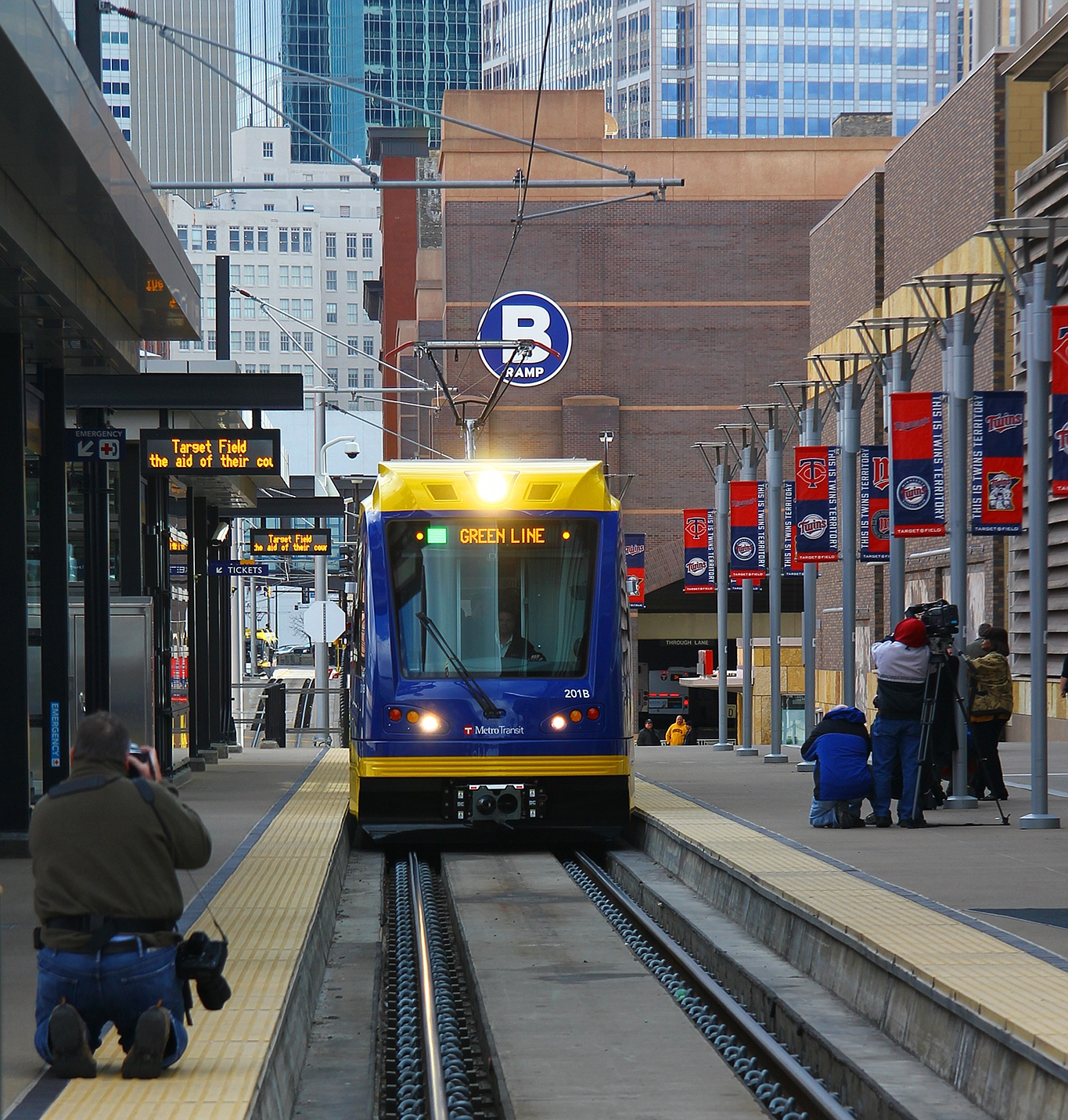
The first Siemens S70 LRV arrives at a media event on October 10, 2012, displaying "Green Line" on the destination board.

In 2010, the Metropolitan Council negotiated a contract with Siemens to build up to 109 S70/Avanto light rail vehicles, with the first vehicle arriving in September 2012. Most are intended for the Green Line (initially the Central Corridor route from Minneapolis to Saint Paul) which opened in 2014 and is to be expanded from Minneapolis to Eden Prairie along the Metro Green Line Extension, though the initial vehicles were used on the Blue Line as part of that route's three-car expansion project. The initial order was for 41 vehicles: 31 for the Green Line and 10 to expand the fleet of the Blue Line, allowing that route to operate three-car trains more consistently. Options for additional vehicles were exercised about a year later as contingency funding from the Central Corridor project opened up. As of 2012, 59 vehicles were on order: 47 for the Green Line and 12 for the Blue.

The initial order had a per-LRV cost of $3,297,714 and a total contract value of $153,211,516. Following the option order, the contract grew to $213 million. The vehicles are being built at Siemens’ facility in Florin, California, near Sacramento. The first vehicle, numbered 201, arrived in September 2012 and underwent some initial testing before being officially unveiled at an event at Target Field on October 10. The first two vehicles had an extended testing period, entering revenue service around the start of 2013.

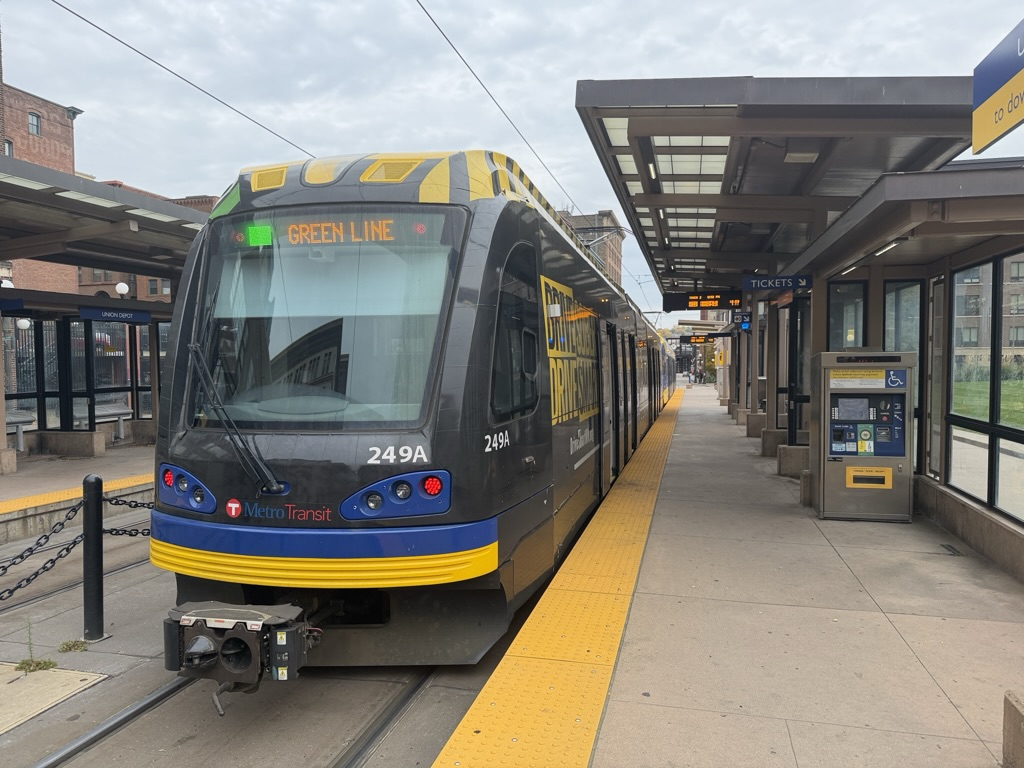
Type II LRV 249A in 2025.

Forty options remained available, for potential use once the Green Line's southwest extension received funding. Five additional Siemens S70 cars were ordered in October 2015. The first car of this small order arrived in September 2017 and the last later in the fall of 2017, bringing the total number of type II LRVs to 64.

The Blue Line's original first-generation fleet of 27 Bombardier Flexity Swift LRVs and the Siemens "type II" LRVs are mechanically, but not electronically, compatible, so while the two generations are able to run on the tracks at the same time and either type would be able to push a malfunctioning unit of the other type, multiple-unit consists may only be assembled of one type.

The type II LRVs weigh 50 tons (100,000 lb or 45.4 t), which is about 6,000 lb (2,700 kg) lighter than the earlier Bombardier units. The cars have improved heating systems and better sound insulation to provide a quieter ride. They also feature LED lighting rather than the previous vehicles' fluorescent tubes. Rear-facing cameras connected to video screens in the operator cab replaced rear-view mirrors in the newer design.

=== Type III LRVs ===
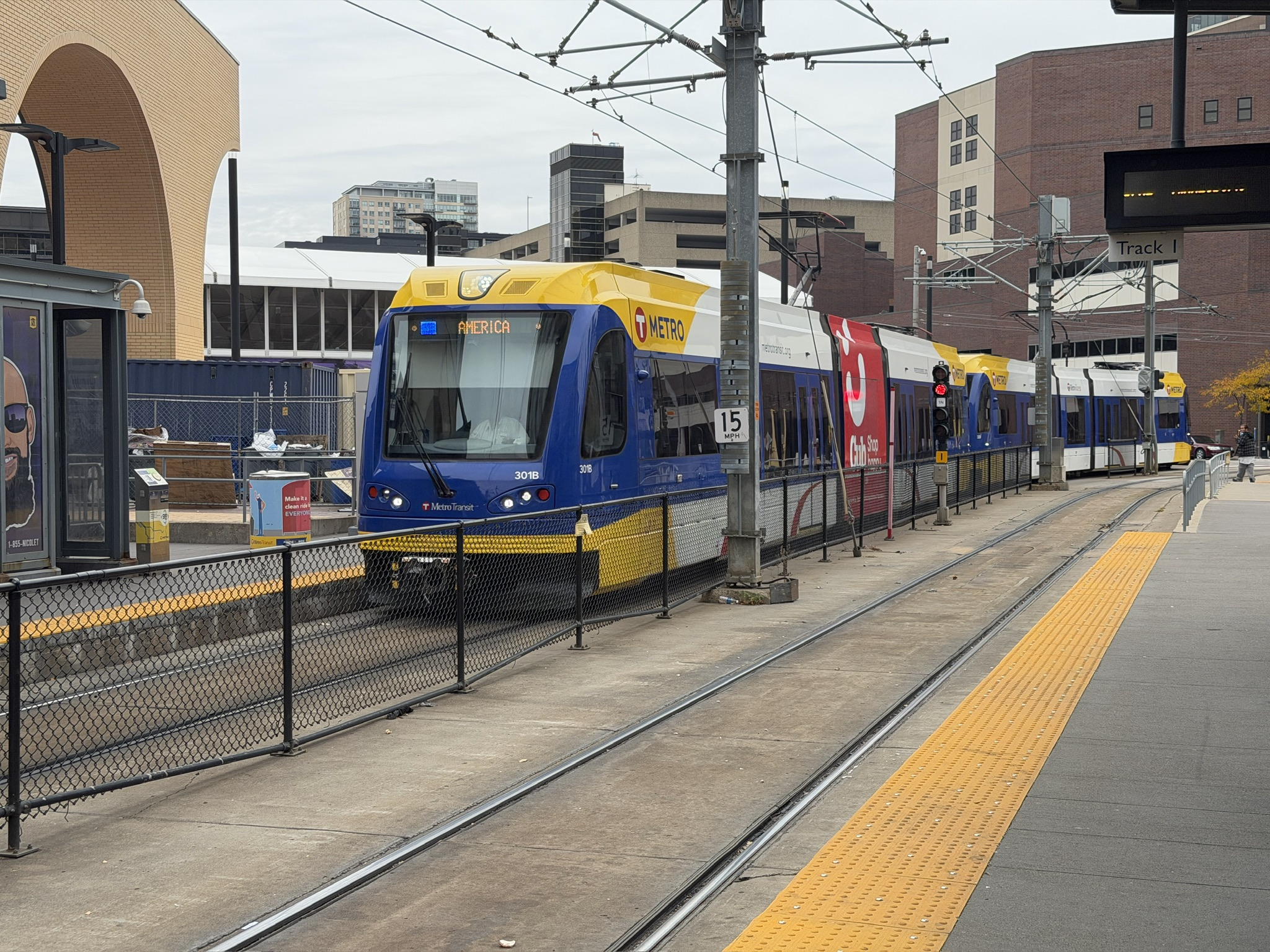
Type III LRV 301B in service in 2025.

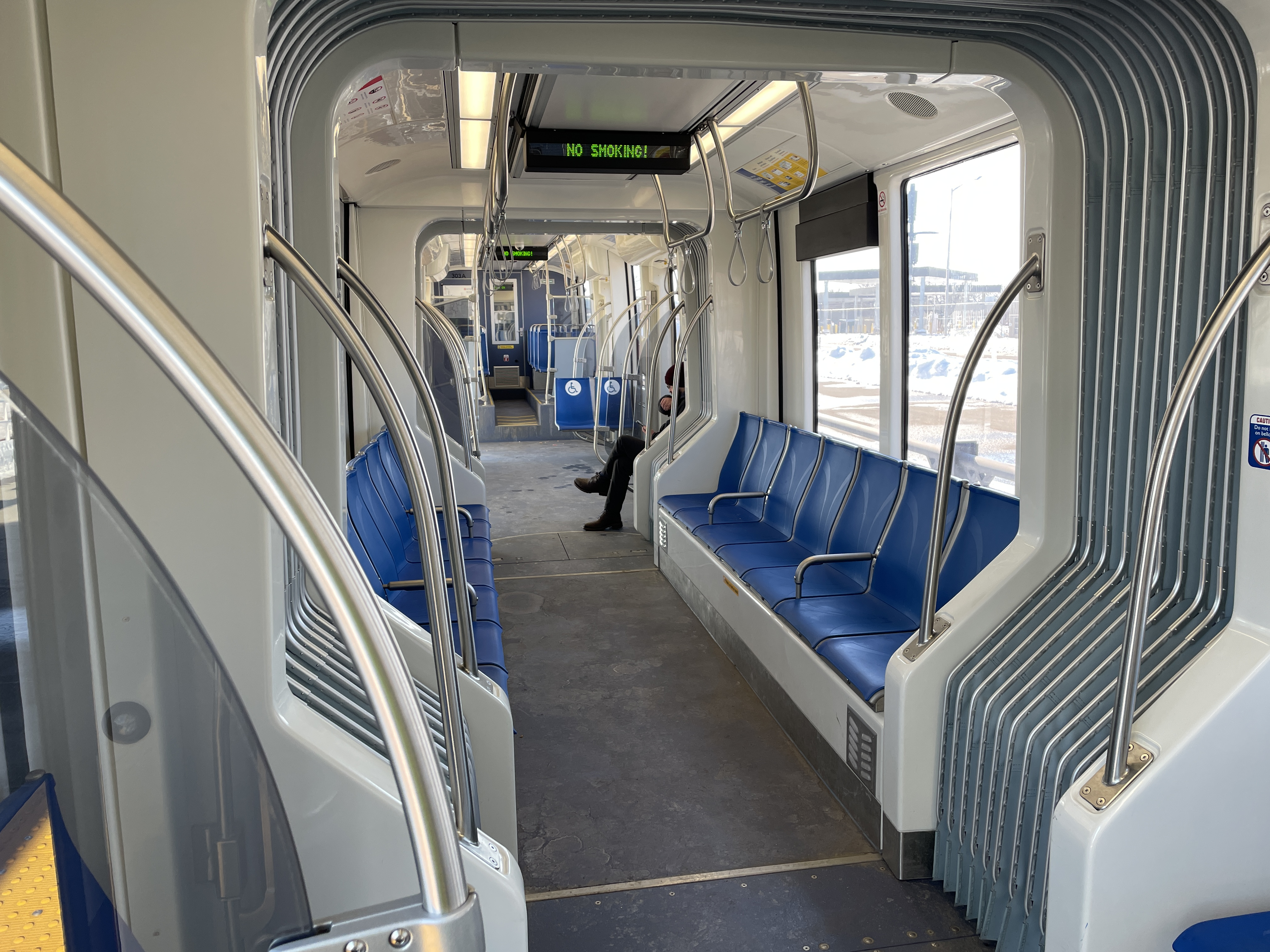
An interior photo of a Type III LRV showing the sideways-facing seats in the center section.

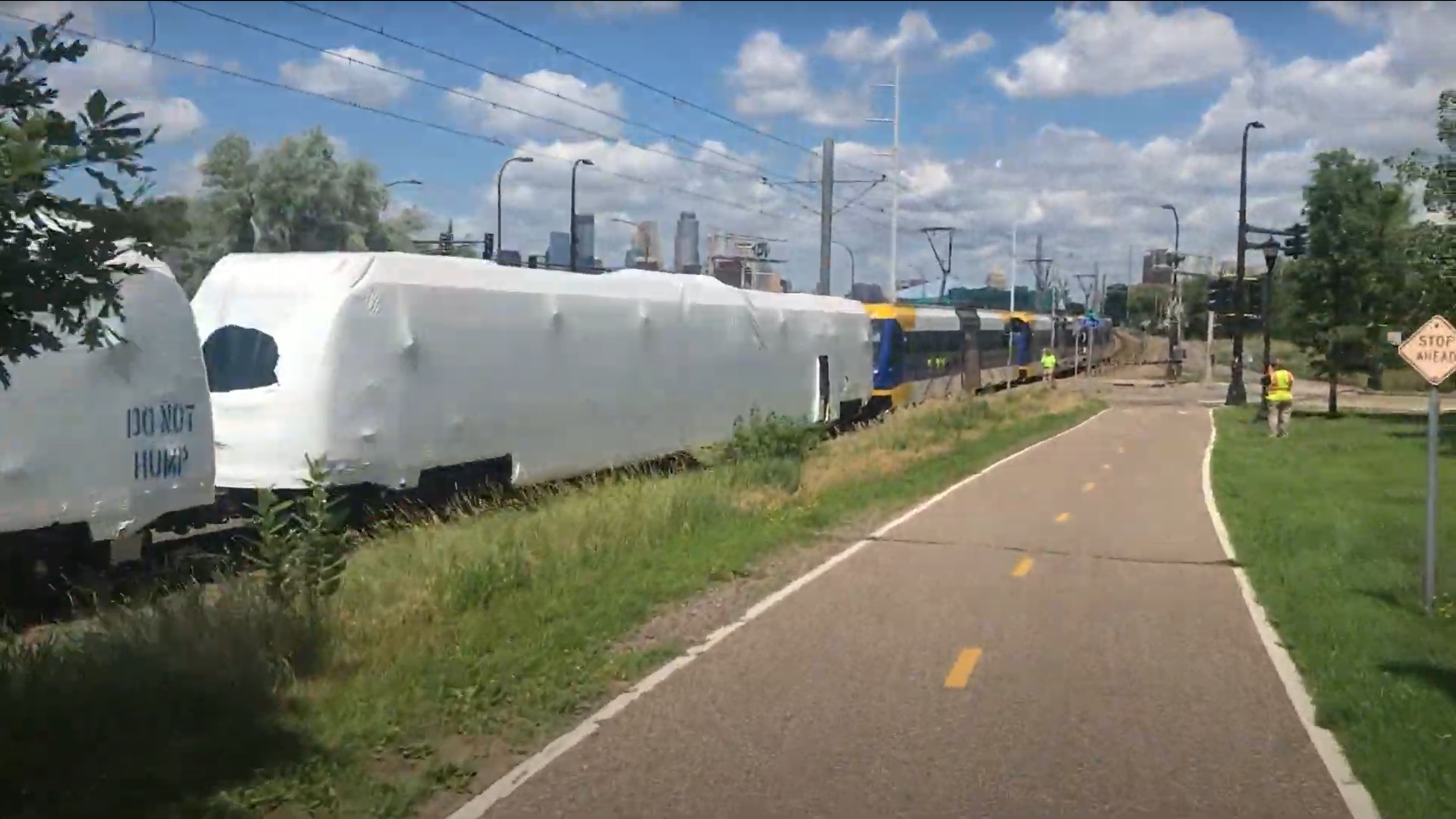
Two Type III LRVs coupled to three Type II LRVs while being accepted by Metro Transit in summer 2020.

In 2016, Metro Transit placed an order for 27 more Siemens S70 (Note: The cars in this order were considered to be model S70 at the time the order was placed, but in 2019/20 were retroactively rebranded as model S700 by Siemens.) LRVs for its planned Metro Green Line Extension. These used a modified center-truck design that allowed sideways-facing seating in the center section, for better passenger flow. In 2018, Siemens adopted a new model number, S700, for S70 LRVs that used the new center-section design, and in 2020 it retroactively applied the new designation to all previous S70 LRVs built to the new design; as a result, all of Metro Transit's type III LRVs (301–327) are now Siemens model S700. The first two S700 vehicles arrived in May 2020.

=== Specifications ===
Model	Type I LRVs LF-70 (Flexity Swift)	Type II LRVs S70	Type III LRVs S700
Fleet numbers	101–127	201–264	301–327
Manufacturer	Bombardier	Siemens	
Build location	Thunder Bay, Ontario	Sacramento, California	
Length per car	93 ft 11 15/16 in (28.65 m)	94.3 ft (28,700 mm)	
Width	8 ft 8 5/16 in (2.65 m)		
Empty weight	48.5 t (107,000 lb)	46.7 t (103,000 lb)	46.5 t (103,000 lb)
Body shell material	Aluminum alloy	Steel	
Line voltage	Overhead line, 750 V DC		
Traction	Toshiba 2-level IGBT–VVVF; 190 hp (140 kW) 3-phase AC induction motor (totally enclosed/outer-fan cooling)	Siemens 2-level IGBT–VVVF; 170 hp (130 kW) 3-phase AC induction motor (totally enclosed/self-ventilating)	
Maximum speed	55 mph (89 km/h)	59 mph (95 km/h)	

=== Operations ===
Since the completion of three-car station extensions in winter 2010, Metro Transit operates one-, two- and three- car trains on the Blue Line, depending on the time of day and ridership needs. Many stations on the line were initially built to be capable of serving only one- or two-car trains, as a cost-saving measure; all of the shorter platforms were designed and built with future extension in mind, and currently all stations are capable of serving three-car trains. The Green Line was built with three-car platforms at all stations.

The number of LRVs in the first-generation fleet limited three-car operations during peak rush hours, as 27 cars did not allow operation of high frequencies with longer trains. In spring and summer 2010, three-car trains were only used for special event service, such as Twins games, when lower off-peak frequencies allow operation of longer trains to meet demand. Metro Transit continued operating two-car trains during the morning and evening rush hours until September 2010, when they began operating some 3-car trains during rush hour. However, this required a reduction in frequency so trains would arrive every 10 minutes rather than every 7–8 minutes (though some 2-car service remains at the old frequency). The arrival of Type II LRVs began to allow 3-car trains at high frequencies in 2013.

=== Maintenance facilities ===
The Blue Line's Operations and Maintenance Facility (OMF) is located between the Cedar-Riverside and Franklin Avenue stations. The facility was expanded in 2011–2012 to make room for the 12 additional type II LRVs and a Light Rail Support Facility to allow some maintenance not requiring direct access to vehicle chassis to be moved out of the OMF building. The Green Line's Operations and Maintenance Facility is located on the site of the former Diamond Products building in Saint Paul's Lowertown neighborhood, just east of the Union Depot station.

== Former commuter rail service ==
The Twin Cities region had one heavy-rail commuter line, the Northstar Line, which was replaced with bus routes 827, 882, and 888 as Metro Transit began focusing on expanding bus and light rail services to serve neighboring suburbs. The Green Line is currently being extended to St. Louis Park, Hopkins, Minnetonka, and Eden Prairie, Minnesota, with an opening date of 2027.

=== Locomotives ===
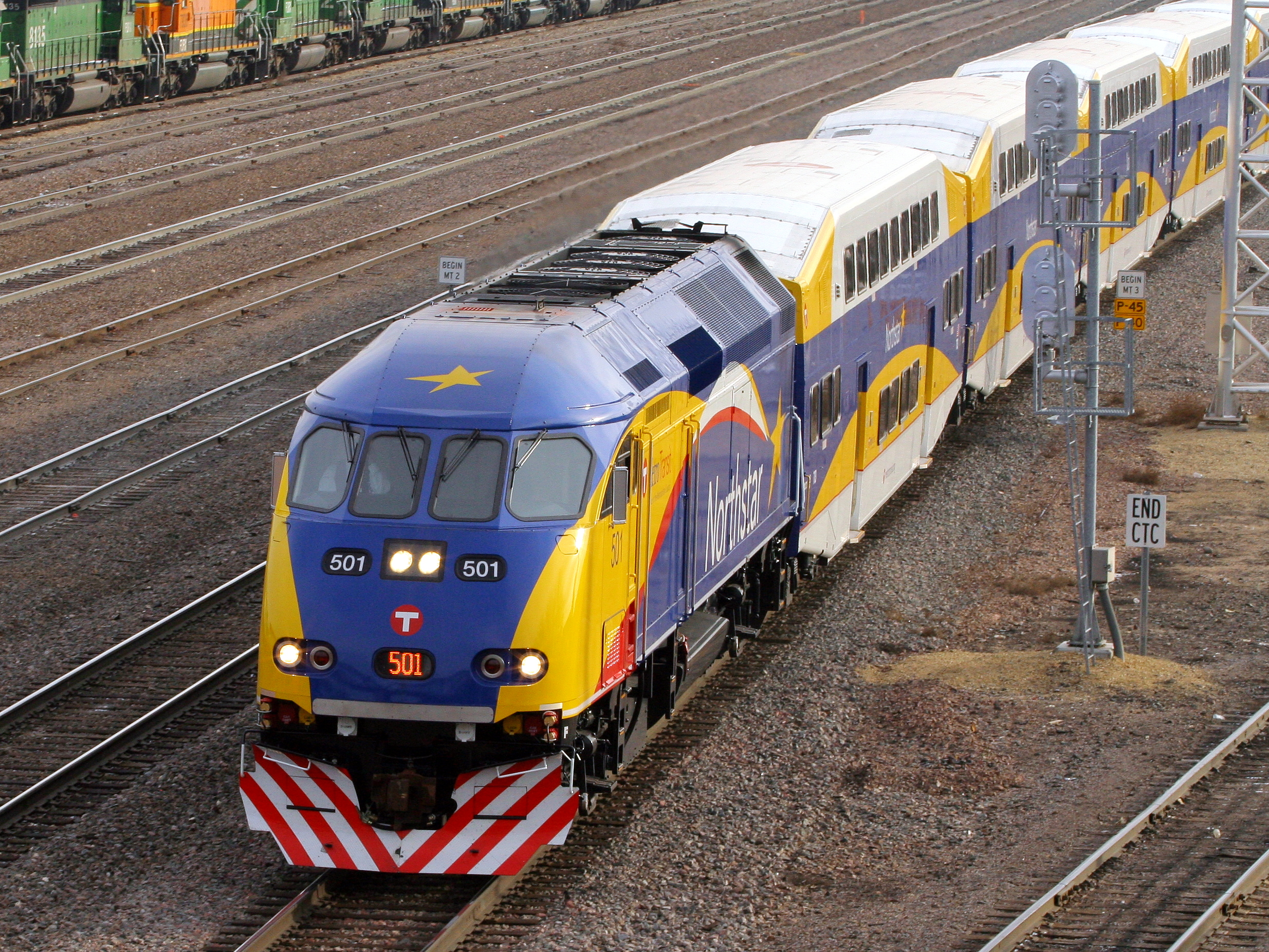
Motive Power MP36PH-3C #501 leading a Northstar train past BNSF's Northtown Yard

The Northstar commuter rail line's first five locomotives were the MP36PH-3C, manufactured by MotivePower in Boise, Idaho at a total cost of $13,823,000. The first of the locomotives, #501, was delivered October 3, 2008. The other four arrived around New Years Day of 2009. The locomotives were numbered sequentially 501 through 505.

Around the time the line began service in November 2009, it was announced that a negotiations were underway with the Utah Transit Authority to acquire a sixth locomotive from their FrontRunner service. This locomotive arrived in December 2009. By June, Metro Transit decided to purchase the UTA locomotive due to high leasing costs and the need to have an extra locomotive for when others are being repaired or inspected. $2.85 million for buying the locomotive and repainting it in Northstar livery came from a $10.1 million contingency fund built into the original cost of the service.

#	Model	Delivery	Notes
501–505, 512	MP36PH-3C	2008–2009	503 and 504 seen in the 200th episode of Dirty Jobs, "Locomotive Builder"; 504 was briefly operated by Mike Rowe.; 512 was originally built as Utah Transit Authority #12 for their FrontRunner service, though it never ran in revenue service there. Leased to Metro Transit starting in December 2009, it was intended to be purchased the following summer, though that deal initially fell through. The Metropolitan Council successfully tried again in 2011, appearing in Northstar colors and renumbered 512 in October 2012.

=== Passenger coaches ===
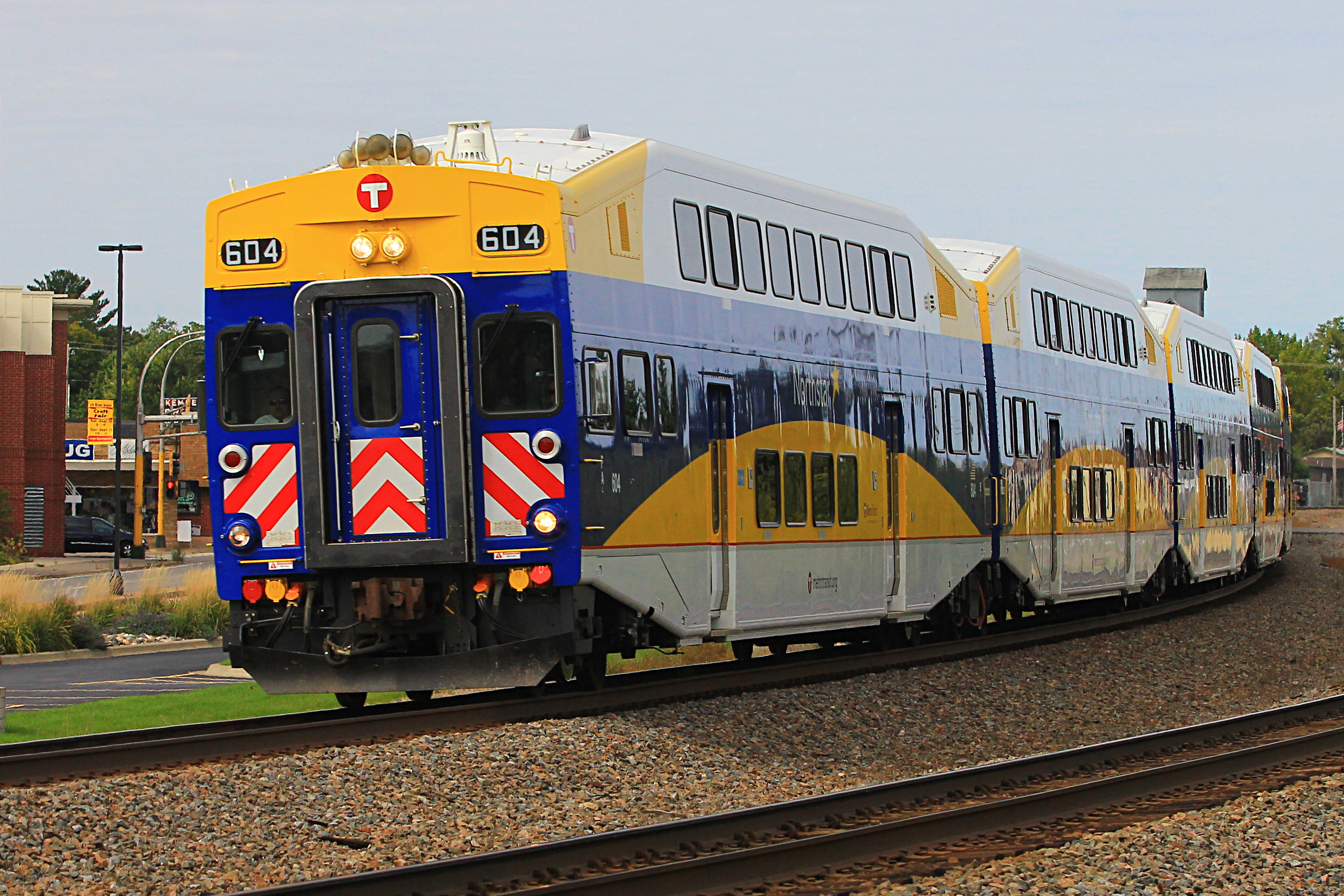
Bombardier Bi-Level cab car #604 leading a Northstar train south through Elk River, Minnesota.

Northstar utilized eighteen Bombardier Bi-Level Coach cars, a number of which are configured as cab cars. With no straightforward way to turn the trains or locomotives around at the ends of the line, the train would simply reverse from Big Lake to Minneapolis. The engineer remotely controls the locomotive from the cab car in the last coach of the train.

#	Model	Delivery	Notes
601–606	Bi-Level VII coach (cab car)	2008-2009	
701–712	Bi-Level VII coach	2008-2009	

=== Consists ===
Five trains were used during a typical day's operations, each consisting of a single locomotive, two or three regular coaches and a cab car coach. An extra locomotive and coach was available for backup if needed. Northstar platforms were built long enough to accommodate trains of five coaches, which were used for some weekend trains in the early weeks of service.

=== Maintenance ===
The maintenance facility for the Northstar Line was located just east of the station in Big Lake, Minnesota.
