= Metro Green Line Extension (Minnesota) =

Under-construction light rail transit line in Hennepin County, Minnesota

Overview
- Status: Under construction
- Locale: Hennepin County, Minnesota
- Termini: SouthWest Station (southwest); Target Field (northeast)
- Stations: 16
- Website: metrocouncil.org/Transportation/Projects/Light-Rail-Projects/METRO-Green-Line-Extension.aspx

Service
- Type: Light rail
- System: Metro Transit
- Operator: Metro Transit
- Daily ridership: 34,000 (projection)

History
- Planned opening: June 12, 2027

Technical
- Line length: 14.5 miles (23.3 km)
- Character: Surface
- Track gauge: 4 ft 8 1/2 in (1,435 mm) standard gauge
- Electrification: Overhead lines

The Metro Green Line Extension (sometimes referred to as the Southwest LRT) is an under–construction 14.5-mile (23.3 km) light rail transit corridor in Hennepin County, Minnesota, with service between Minneapolis and Eden Prairie. The estimated one-way travel time from Southwest Station in Eden Prairie to Target Field Station in Minneapolis is 32 minutes. The line extends through St. Louis Park, Hopkins and Minnetonka along the route. Major locations on the line include Bde Maka Ska, Cedar Lake, the Walker Art Center, the Minneapolis Sculpture Garden and Target Field in downtown Minneapolis.

Hennepin County selected the alignment of the route and worked with the Metropolitan Council on environmental impact statements for the project. The Metropolitan Council is managing construction of the route. On November 15, 2018, the council accepted an $800 million construction bid by Lunda Construction and C.S. McCrossan, with early construction starting in December 2018. The project has had numerous construction delays, especially at the site of a tunnel near the Kenilworth Trail corridor.

The delays have increased the cost of the project from an estimated $1.3 billion in 2013 to $2.86 billion in 2024 and pushed back the expected opening date first from 2018 to 2023, then to 2027, resulting in bipartisan criticism of the Metropolitan Council and Hennepin County for mismanagement. The Metro Green Line Extension is the most expensive public works project in Minnesota history. On September 26, 2026, the council announced that the extension will open on June 12, 2027.

== Route ==
The line begins at the Southwest Transit Station in Eden Prairie, passing Eden Prairie's Town Center and crosses US 212 and I-494.

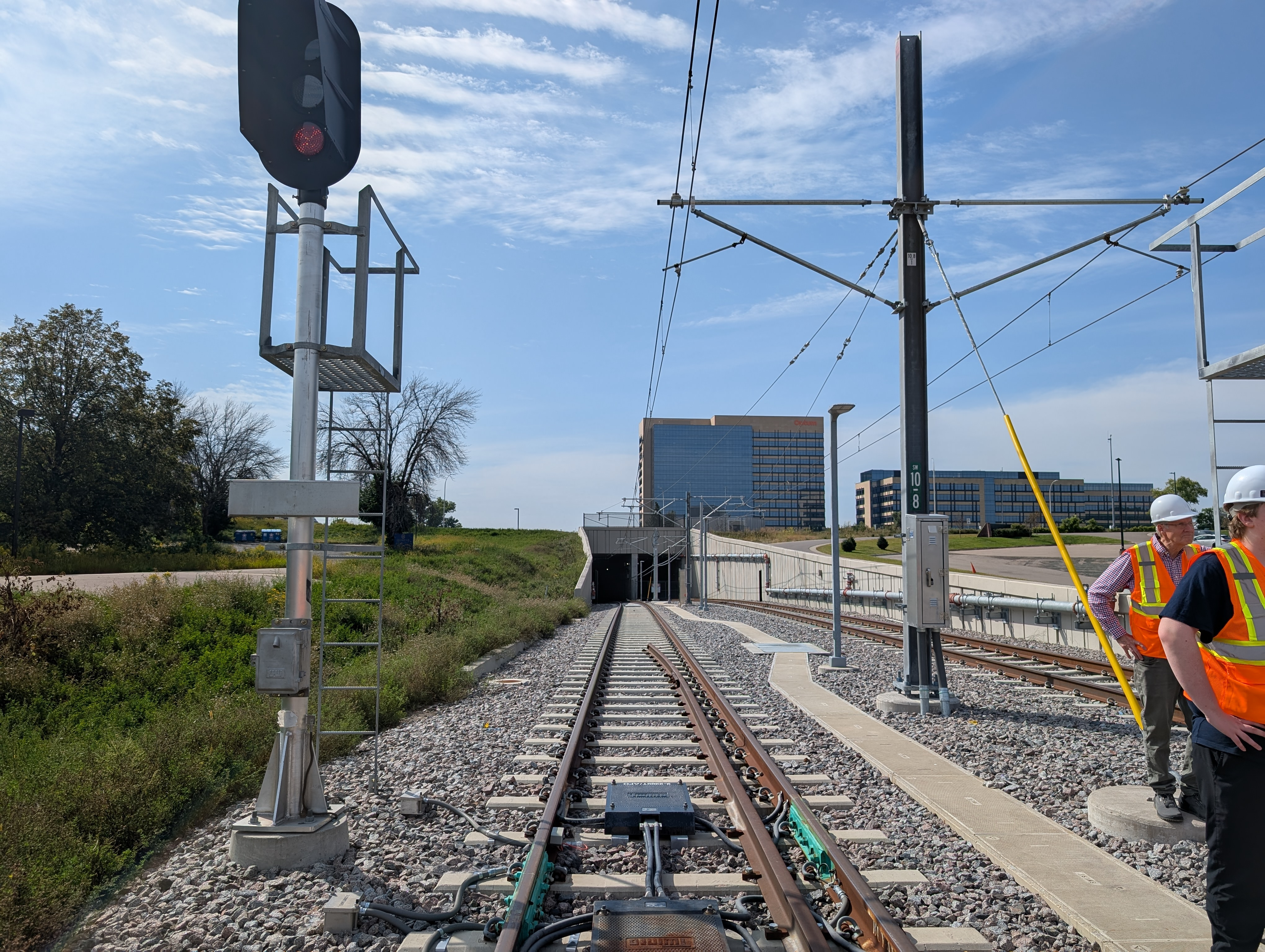
Tunnel under 62 between City West and Opus station, with Optum headquarters behind

It goes into the Golden Triangle, under MN 62, and into Opus. It crosses into Minnetonka on a bridge, and enters the railroad corridor. It turns east into Hopkins, and passes under US 169. It goes east, and has four more stations before entering Minneapolis.

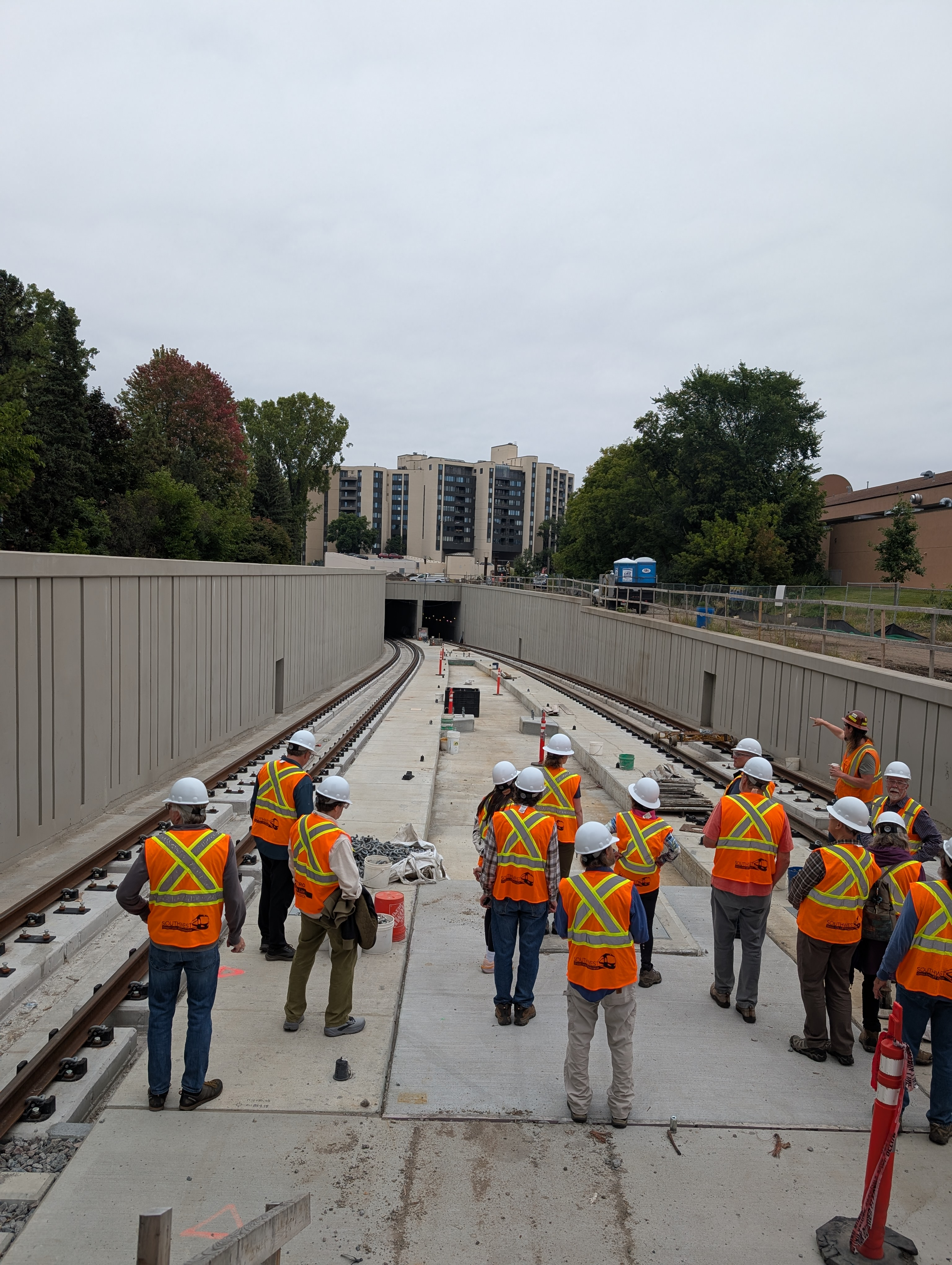
South Portal of the Kenilworth Tunnel, September 2025.

It turns north, and enters a tunnel. Upon exiting the tunnel, it has three stations, and passes under I-394 and I-94. It leaves the railroad, enters Royalston, and terminates at Target Field.

== History ==
In 1988, the Hennepin County Regional Railroad Authority (HCRRA) identified the Southwest transitway from Hopkins to downtown Minneapolis as a future LRT corridor.

In 2002 and 2003, the HCRRA conducted the Southwest Rail Transit Study to evaluate twelve possible light rail routes in the southwest transitway. Of the twelve routes, eight were eliminated and four were selected for further analysis: routes 1A, 2A, 3A and 4A.

On March 4, 2009, the FTA approved a $2 million study of the project, with a then-anticipated opening date in 2015. On May 26, 2010, the Metropolitan Council voted to approve the locally preferred alternative advanced by Hennepin County. The project at that point transferred to Metropolitan Council control and at the time was expected to begin service in 2018. Since receiving approval from the Metropolitan Council on May 26, 2010, the extension joins the Metro Blue Line Extension as an official part of the Metro Council's project list. The Metropolitan Council began design work in 2013, after the completion of the draft Environmental Impact Statement.

=== Route debate ===
Several possible routing variations were evaluated to determine the final routing of the line. There was local debate about the route the line would take between the Chain of Lakes and downtown Minneapolis. Routes 1A and 3A (the chosen route) use the Kenilworth Corridor, a dedicated stretch of right-of-way owned by the HCRRA to be used for future rail transit. Route 3C would have the tracks run much further east through the trench used by the Midtown Greenway before turning north at Nicollet Avenue, where it would have run in a tunnel for part of the way downtown.

On May 26, 2010, the Metropolitan Council approved route 3A as the locally preferred alternative for the line. There was a protracted debate over the route choice in the years leading up to this decision, with many parties strongly opposed to the final route choice. The final choice in favor of 3A was made for several reasons, including its favorable Cost Effectiveness Index (CEI) score and its relatively lower environmental impacts.

==== Kenilworth alignment (routes 1A, 3A-chosen route) ====
The Kenilworth Corridor was acquired by the HCRRA to preserve it for future rail transit. The Kenilworth routing would have provided shorter ride times for the majority of the line's users compared to the 3C routing. It was considered less expensive to build and operate.

Supporters of a network alignment propose that a streetcar or trolley line be installed alongside the Midtown Greenway to connect the Metro Green Line Extension line to the existing Blue Line; however, this will not occur. Rather LRT will be used for the full stretch of the line. The Midtown Greenway Coalition has long supported and promoted the network alignment. The group successfully prevented the trench from being used for a busway and instead pitched the idea of the trench being used for a potential streetcar line.

Some residents living adjacent to the Kenilworth Corridor favored the 3C route because they were concerned about the noise and disturbance of the trains passing through the corridor near their homes. The Kenilworth Corridor presently contains an active freight rail line and the light rail will be in addition to this existing track. Operating the two LRT tracks adjacent to the Twin Cities & Western Railroad line (four freight trains each day) will require Metro Transit to purchase a standard $300 Million insurance policy holding the railroad harmless for any accidents caused by derailments of freight or LRT trains. The annual premium cost of this policy is approximately $1.5 Million.

Members of Southwest Policy Advisory Committee allege that the chair of the committee, Hennepin County commissioner Gail Dorfman, refused to allow debate over concerns with the Kenilworth Corridor alignment. They also allege that County planners manipulated cost benefit calculations of the different route options to lead to preference for the Kenilworth alignment.

==== Greenway/Nicollet alignment (route 3C) ====
Advocates of the 3C route wanted the line to directly serve Uptown and Eat Street, and feel that routing the line through the Kenilworth Corridor would be a missed opportunity for increased ridership and better transit in this area of Minneapolis.

Some Eat Street business owners were concerned that the access and traffic problems resulting from the construction period on Nicollet Avenue would severely affect their business. Engineers indicated Nicollet Avenue may have been tunneled instead of at-grade.

In early 2008, Hennepin County Medical Center acquired a city block parcel at 28th Street and Nicollet where the 3C Route would turn from the Midtown Greenway trench onto or under Nicollet Avenue. HCMC built a clinic on the site that does not incorporate a light rail station or easement into the building. That would have prevented the 3C route from turning at this location since there is not enough space for tracks to make the minimum required turning radius.

==== Neighborhood positions ====
During public input phases in 2007–2008 the final three proposed routes faced opposition by some members of two Minneapolis neighborhoods, Kenwood and Whittier. Kenwood's neighborhood organization released an official neighborhood stance against the line with Whittier's organization debating to release a stance. In Kenwood, one of the wealthiest neighborhoods, their criticism involves disruption to natural parkland and noise though the Kenilworth Corridor (which routes '1A' and '3A' would run on). The corridor is home to the Kenilworth Trail, a scenic bike and pedestrian trail that runs adjacent to a rarely used freight rail line. In Whittier, disruption to Nicollet Avenue by the '3C' route had brought concern to business owners regarding Eat Street as a business, restaurant and retail corridor of the Whittier neighborhood.

The Bryn Mawr neighborhood has favored the routes moving through the Kenilworth Corridor as it supports their redevelopment plans. Also, suburban cities have received the proposals favorably with concern over routing within their cities than opposition of the line itself. The 3A route through job centers in Eden Prairie garnered approval from its City Council. Hopkins also proposed routing the line through their downtown Main Street, but it will instead be routed nearby.

== Initial funding ==
In April 2015, the council released an updated analysis of the project, with projected costs raised by more than $300 million to $1.994 billion, largely as a result of additional sitework and ground preparation due to poor soil along the route. The expected opening date of the line was also pushed back to 2020, as a result of delays to the next draft of the Environmental Impact Statement, which was expected to be released in May 2015, more than a year after the original planned release in January 2014. To bring costs within the original budget, Metropolitan Council members proposed measures such as eliminating the Mitchell Road station in Eden Prairie or decreasing the size of the Hopkins maintenance facility.

A reduced $1.744 billion budget for the line was approved by the Metropolitan Council in July 2015. Changes from the original plan included the deletion of the Mitchell Road terminus, removal of planned station art, and the deferral of the Eden Prairie Town Center station.

On May 22, 2016, the Minnesota Legislature was unable to agree on whether to fund the State of Minnesota's 10% portion of the project. On August 31, 2016, the State's 10% portion ($144.5 million) was funded by Certificates of Participation by three government bodies: the Metropolitan Council ($103.5 million), the Counties Transit Improvement Board ($20.5 million) and Hennepin County ($20.5 million) to close the $144.5 million gap.

On February 15, 2017, the Metropolitan Council announced that the Southwest LRT design and engineering phase would be complete at the end of 2017.

== Cost overruns and delays ==
The majority of funding for the Metro Green Line Extension came from the Federal Transit Administration and Hennepin County, as of March 2022, FTA contributed $969.2 million and Hennepin County contributed $772 million. The initial budget, however, increased over time due to delays in planning and delays in construction. In 2018, the Metropolitan Council estimated $2.003 billion for the line and an opening date in 2023, however, by January 2022, the cost had increased to $2.738 billion with an opening date in 2027. The Office of the Legislative Auditor identified Kenilworth tunnel construction, extension of a crash wall between freight rail, and the addition of a station in Eden Prairie (which had previously been removed to save money on the project) as reasons for construction delays and increased costs. In March 2022, the Metro Green Line Extension project had a $534.9 million funding gap as a result of these cost overruns. In January 2024, the Metropolitan Council and Hennepin County reached an agreement to fund the remainder of the Metro Green Line Extension project, which had increased to $2.86 billion in total.

The delays and cost overruns of the Southwest Light Rail line renewed calls to reform the Metropolitan Council, resulting a state legislative task force and a law passed in giving the Minnesota Department of Transportation more oversight of future transit projects.

=== Office of the Legislative Auditor Reports ===
In March 2023, the Minnesota Office of the Legislative Auditor reported that in planning construction for the Metro Green Line Extension, the Metropolitan Council obligated funds that it did not have and failed to develop a contingency plan if the required project funding did not materialize. The Metropolitan Council had solicited bids for civil construction with project specifications it knew to be incomplete. After bidding was completed, the Metropolitan Council's addition of substantial new or changed work resulted in delays and increased costs. Legislative Auditor Judy Randall noted that the Metropolitan Council was less cooperative than most state agencies they audited, and criticized their lack of transparency in communicating problems related to the Metro Green Line Extension to the public.

In April 2025, the state Office of the Legislative Auditor released a report highlighting new instances of mismanagement, drawing bipartisan rebuke. The report highlighted approving change orders that were much higher than original estimates, inadequate monitoring and overpayment for contaminated soil disposal, inadequate monitoring and reporting on suppliers classified as "disadvantaged business enterprises," and failure to always have proper security measures in place.

As a result of recommendations from the Office of the Legislative Auditor and a December 2022 peer review from MNDOT, the Metropolitan Council hired new independent cost estimating consultants and modified project planning procedures to more accurately identify risks before beginning construction.

== Legal issues ==
In September 2022, a man sued the Metropolitan Council for damage to his warehouse along the Kenilworth corridor, alleging the Metropolitan Council only offered to pay 15% of the damages he assessed.

In January 2024, a whistleblower engineer working for the Metropolitan Council sued the agency alleging fraud and mismanagement related to multiple change orders. The whistleblower alleged that the Metropolitan Council was ignoring cost estimates and pressured contractors to inflate change order costs with little to no oversight.

=== Cedar Isles Condominium ===
In January 2022, work on the Kenilworth tunnel was stopped due to alleged damage to a neighboring condominium. In mid-April 2022, Socotec Engineering Inc. was contracted by the Metropolitan Council to determine the cause of building damage and concluded 75% was caused by seasonal temperature changes and 25% was caused by light rail construction, allowing construction to resume. However, some residents and elected officials were skeptical of this assessment due to the close proximity of construction and building damage seen. In March 2023, condominium owners at the affected building reported that damage related to light rail construction was worsening, and as a result, the Metropolitan Council entered into a mediation process with residents of the building claiming construction damage. This mediation process, led by former Minnesota Supreme Court chief justice Kathleen A. Blatz, has resulted in at least $300,000 in payments to homeowners.

== Construction ==
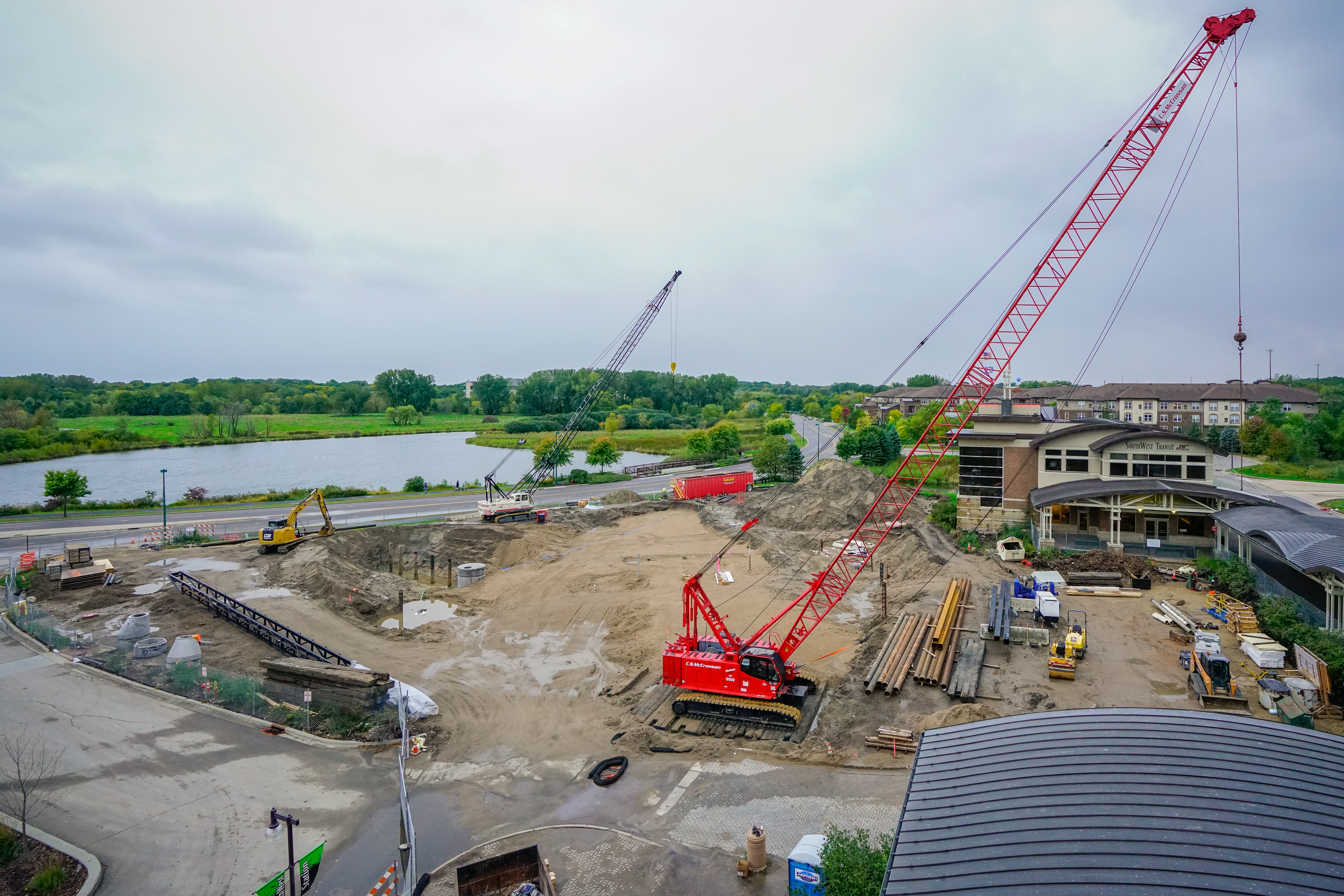
Work underway in 2019 on the SouthWest station, part of the extended Green Line to Eden Prairie

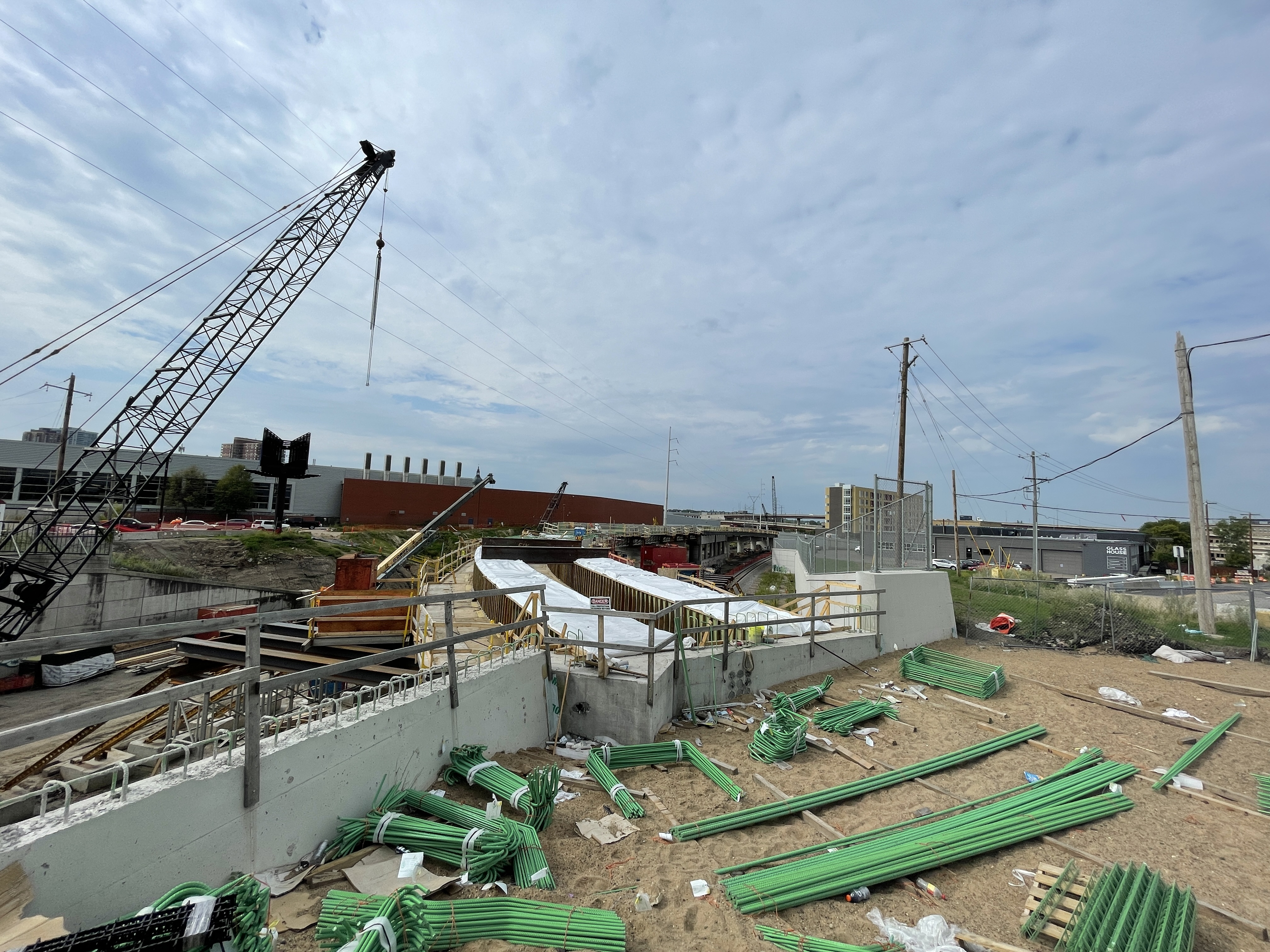
Southwest LRT construction from Royalston Ave towards Cedar Lake Trail and Glenwood Avenue - August 2022

Construction bids were revealed publicly on August 15, 2017 but were rejected for being too costly and non-responsive (Bids did not meet the requirements). As of May 2018, the Metropolitan Council estimated the building costs to be at $2.003 billion. On November 15, 2018, the Council accepted an $800 million construction bid for a section of the construction by Lunda Construction and C.S. McCrossan.

In 2018 construction of the line was the State of Minnesota's largest public works project and is happening in all five cities to be served by the line is. The project is known to disrupt major trails such as the Cedar Lake LRT Regional Trail and the Kenilworth Trail. The line was expected to be completed in 2023, but unexpected poor soils in the Kenilworth Corridor have delayed the opening. In July 2021 the Metropolitan Council did not have a date when the line will be completed or how delays will affect project cost. In a private call with government stakeholders, the Metropolitan Council expected a delay of at least two years, pushing a late 2025 opening at the earliest. Construction contractors will use alternate construction methods for the portion with poor soils. In January 2022 Metropolitan Council officials changed the expected opening to 2027 with increased costs between $450 and $550 million expected.

Initial construction began in late 2018 with brush removal, and heavy construction of the line began in 2019. The project reached its 25% completion milestone in August 2020 and a 50% completion in July 2021. In March 2025, the project reached 90% completion on civil construction, with work scheduled to end in 2025. In September 2025, it was announced that testing of trains on the line would begin in the fall. Testing commenced in October 2025 using a railcar mover to tow LRT vehicles along the line due to the overhead wire being inactive. Over 4,000 federally mandated tests must be conducted along the line before service can begin. Testing is scheduled to run through 2026, with the line slated to open on June 12, 2027.

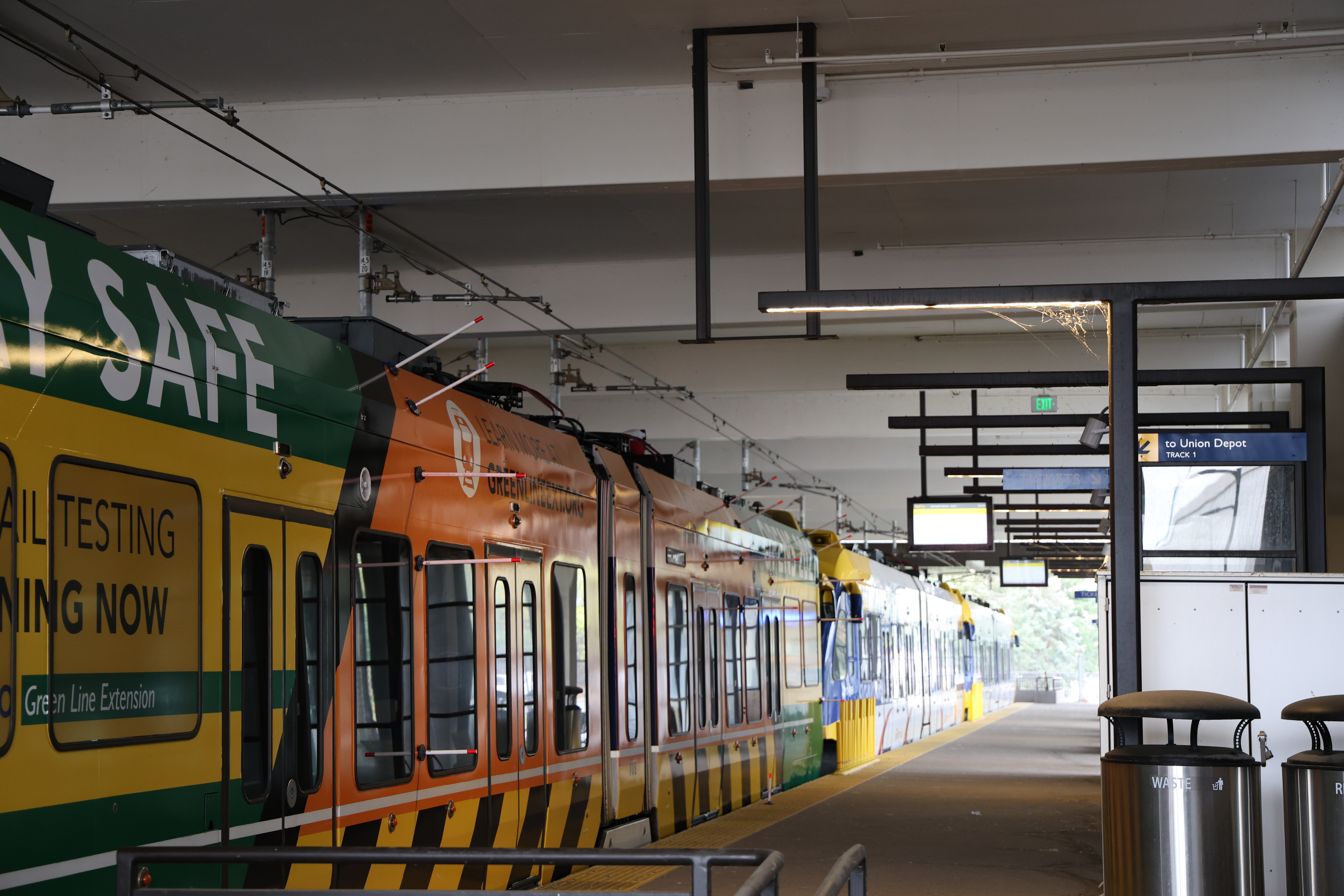
Testing trains at SouthWest Station in late 2025.

=== Challenges ===
Throughout construction, most challenges and delays have occurred within the Kenilworth corridor. Most notably, construction halted for 3 months due to building damage to the Cedar Isles Condominium.

In February 2023, construction crews unearthed an unexpected impediment during Kenilworth tunnel construction. At the time, it was unknown whether or not this would delay construction of the tunnel further; a concern was raised that the rock found could be part of the foundation to the nearby Cedar Isles Condominiums. However, in March 2023 the impediment was removed without incident.

In March 2024, a local resident identified an error in construction on track lines. Design plans approximately 1 mile from the West 21st Street station specified 25 feet of separation between light rail track placement and freight tracks, but the light rail tracks were placed with only 24 feet of separation. While TC&W stated the 25 foot minimum was for worker safety while in the area and Jason Alexander, the project manager, referred to it as "a small issue," it caused some concern for nearby residents. In June 2024, the construction error was fixed by the contractor.

==== Soil issues in the Kenilworth tunnel corridor ====
The largest driver of delays for the Metro Green Line Extension project was the Kenilworth tunnel, according to the Office of the Legislative Auditor and several Metropolitan Council officials interviewed for a March 2023 review. Before construction began, the tunnel was identified as a complicated project element because of the proximity to freight rail and residential buildings. According to project staff, soil issues were not anticipated before construction began; geological studies did not indicate that the initial construction method would be a concern. Engineering contractors and equipment suppliers for the Metropolitan Council agreed prior to construction that based on soil work done in the corridor, soil conditions would not hinder tunnel construction. Nevertheless, in December 2019, the civil construction contractor Lunda-McCrossan discovered poor soil conditions in the Kenilworth tunnel area, making sheet pile installation much more difficult and time consuming. By October 2020, Lunda-McCrossan submitted schedules to the Metropolitan Council indicating that construction work would be delayed by 25 months; however, the Metropolitan Council did not announce to the public until January 2021 that the project would be delayed, and did not specify by what amount of time. It was not until January 2022 that the project office announced construction would be delayed 34 months.

Soil settling issues required tunnel construction to get quite close to buildings in the corridor. To protect the foundation of nearby buildings, an approximately 500-foot secant wall was added to construction plans. This required new equipment, different crews, and modified construction plans to be drawn up to complete tunnel construction. All of these issues contributed significantly to delays and increased costs.

=== Improvements ===
Throughout the corridor, construction of the Metro Green Line Extension project has changed existing infrastructure, such as adding pedestrian and bicycle underpasses on the Cedar Lake Trail where they did not previously exist, updating trail bridges, improving freight rail crossings, and replacing freight rail track. A large amount of housing has been built in the cities along the route near stations, and according to the Metropolitan Council, over $1.8 billion in development has been built or permitted along the route. On opening in 2027, Metro Transit plans to begin operating new bus routes that connect to new light rail stations, modifying existing routes to connect to new light rail stations, and offering new microtransit options to light rail stations in Minnetonka.

== Rolling stock ==
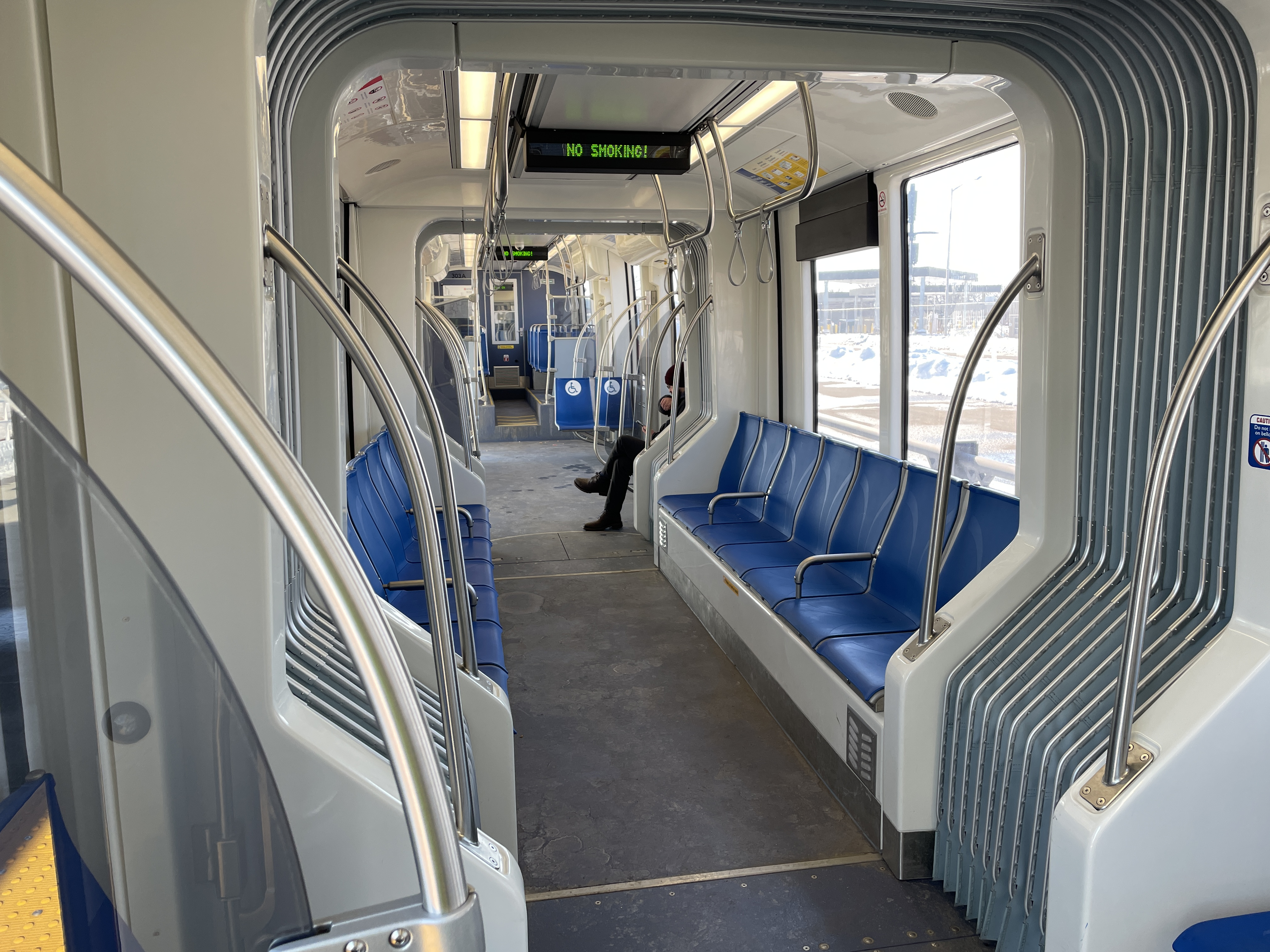
Metro Transit Type III LRV interior

In 2016, the Metropolitan Council reserved $118 million to Siemens to build a fleet of 27 vehicles for the Southwest LRT. An order for these 27 Siemens S700 vehicles was placed in October 2016.

These used a modified center-truck design that allowed sideways-facing seating in the center section, for better passenger flow. In 2018, Siemens adopted a new model number, S700, for S70 LRVs that used the new center-section design, and in 2020 it retroactively applied the new designation to all previous S70 LRVs built to the new design; as a result, all of Metro Transit's type III LRVs (301–327) are now Siemens model S700. The first two of 27 Siemens S700 light rail vehicles ordered for the project were delivered to Metro Transit on May 21, 2020.
