= SouthWest Station =

Park and ride facility and a transit hub in Eden Prairie, Minnesota, USA

SouthWest
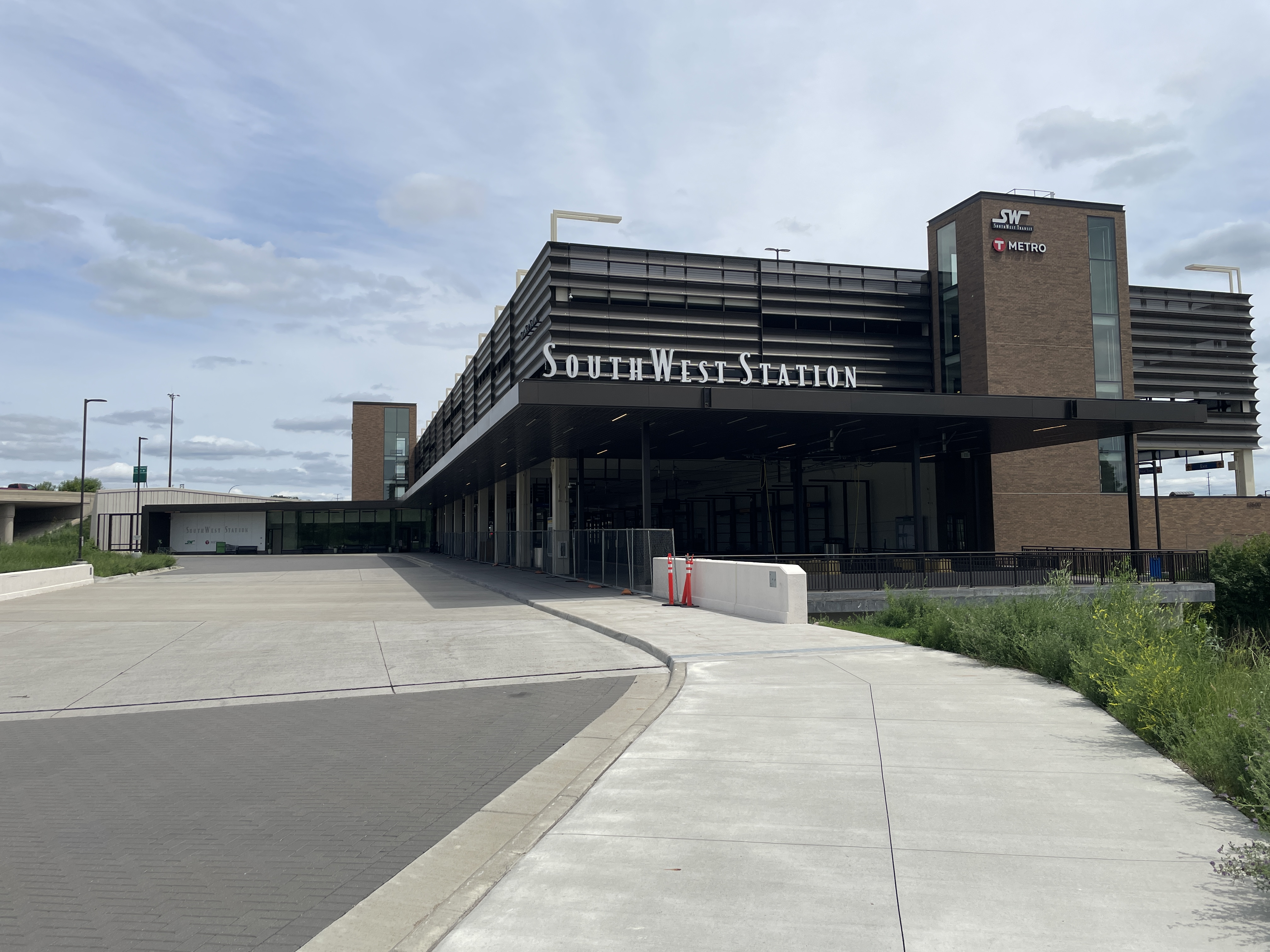
- SouthWest Station in June 2024. Underneath the parking structure on the right are the platforms for the Green Line. On the left are areas for buses and an indoor bus waiting area.

General information
- Location: 13500 Technology Dr. Eden Prairie, MN 55344
- Coordinates: 44.8600041°N 93.44305109°W
- System: Metro light rail and SouthWest Transit bus station
- Owner: Metropolitan Council
- Line: Green Line Extension (2027)
- Tracks: 2

Construction
- Parking: 925 spaces (450 additional spaces by 2027)
- Accessible: Yes

History
- Opened: Late 1990s (bus)
- Opening: 2027 (light rail)

Services
Future service
| Preceding station | Metro | Following station |
|---|---|---|
| Terminus | Green Line Extension | Eden Prairie Town Center toward Target Field |
Location

SouthWest Station is a park and ride facility and a transit hub with two bus platforms for SouthWest Transit in Eden Prairie, Minnesota. The station is being reconfigured to include a light rail station on the Metro Green Line Extension. The station is located on Technology Drive in Eden Prairie, just north of the Purgatory Creek wetland area and south of U.S. Route 212. In December 2018 the Metropolitan Council purchased the station from SouthWest Transit for $8 million. The Metropolitan Council's 2021 park-and-ride system report found 156 cars parked at the station compared to 829 in 2019 before the COVID-19 pandemic.

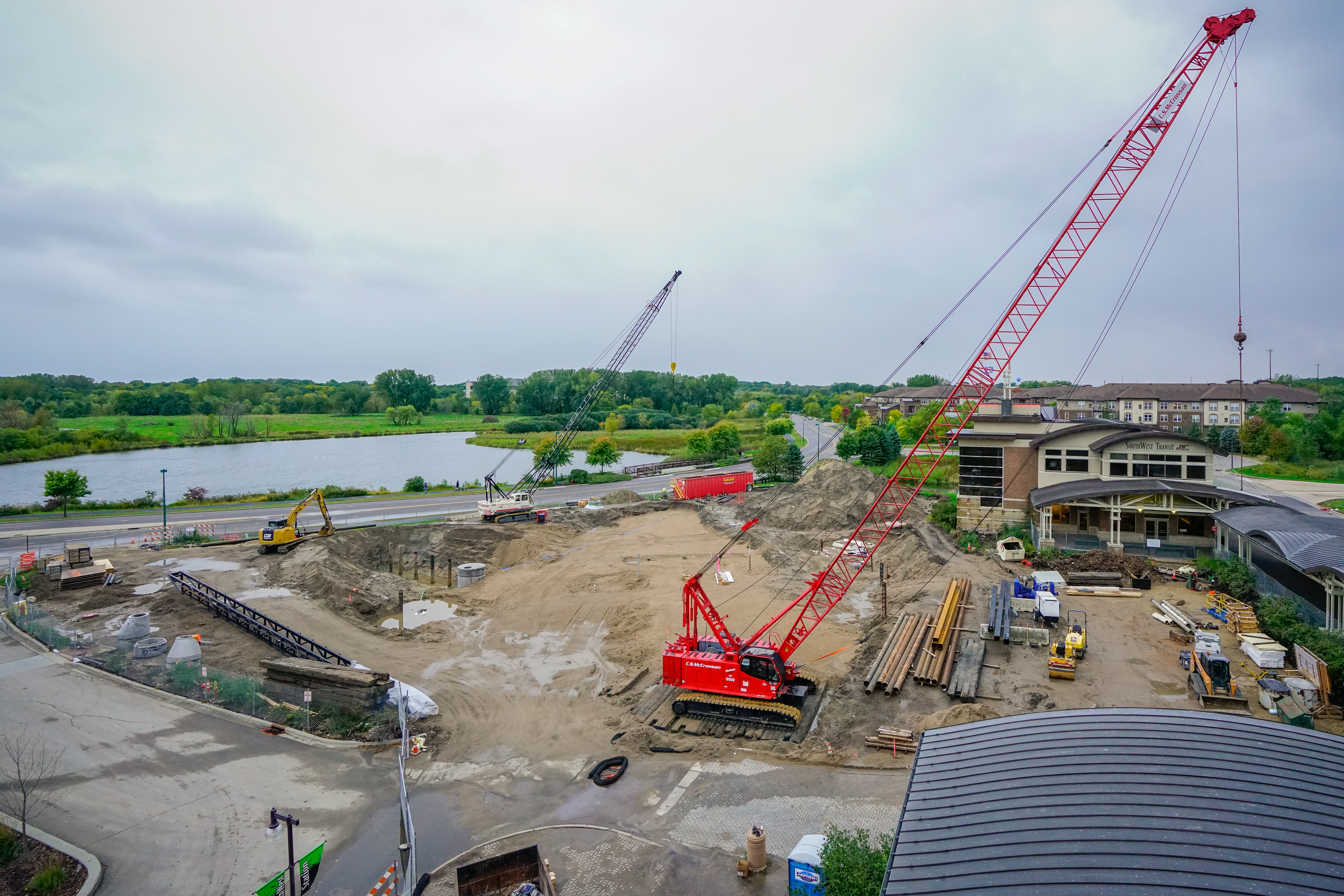
Work underway in 2019 on the SouthWest station

Modeled after Burnsville Transit Station, SouthWest station was one of several suburban park and ride facilities opened in the Twin Cities in the late 1990s. When it originally opened in 1998, it had 500 parking spaces and 15 acres of surrounding land available for housing and commercial development. The station cost $5 million which was twice the cost of Burnsville Station. Construction began on a 3 level parking ramp in November 2001 that could accommodate 700 vehicles. The new parking ramp cost $9.7 million and was designed to accommodate a 4th level with additional spaces. Land surrounding the station had begun to be sold for restaurants, apartments, and townhouses. By 2006 parking on the site had expanded to 900 spaces on 5 levels but was still often full. At the time, SouthWest Station had 230 units of housing.
