= Agamim Classical Academy =

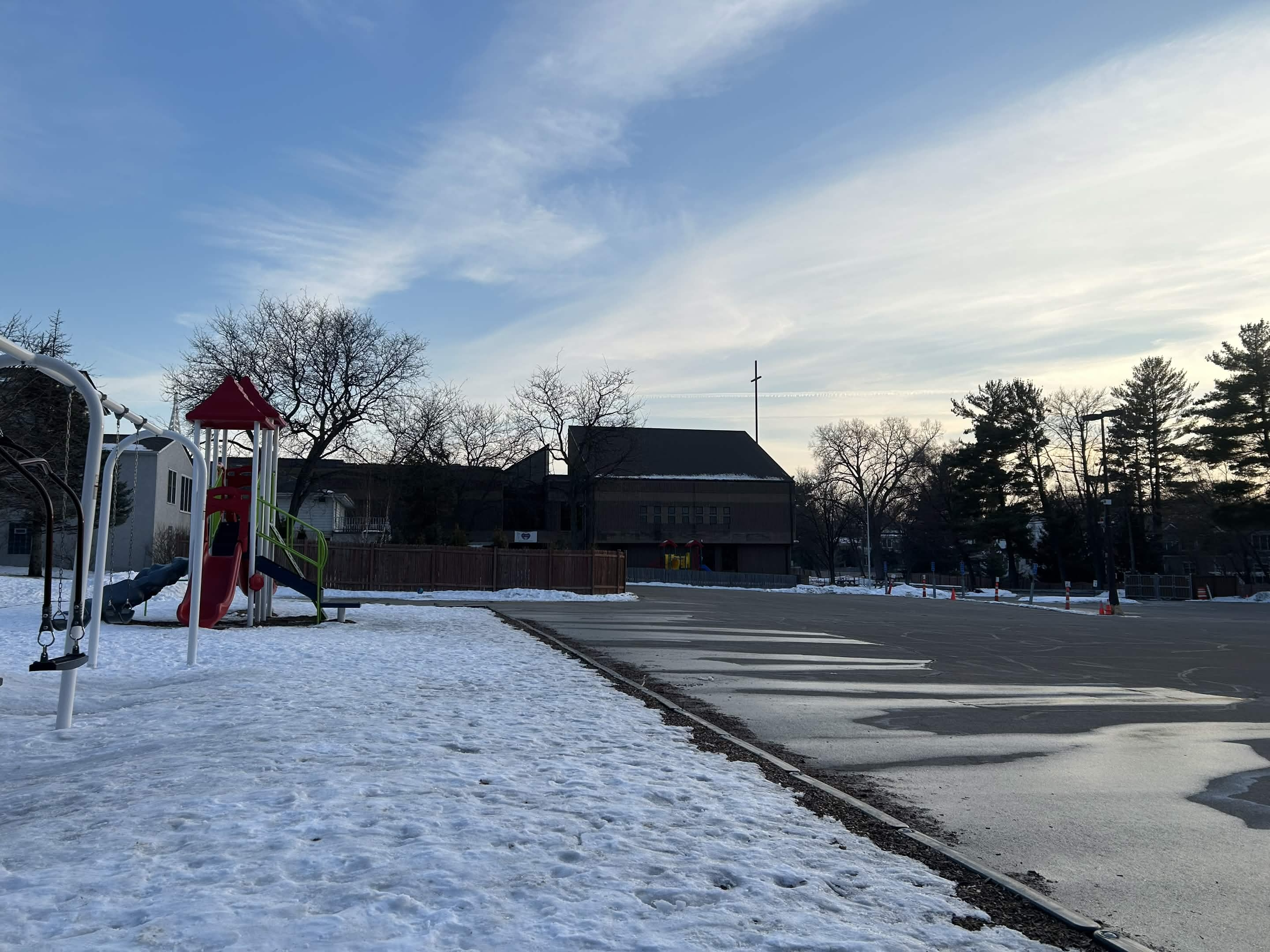
- Agamim from its recess area in February 2026

Location
- 1503 Boyce St (2015–2019); 5300 France Avenue S (2019–present); Edina, Minnesota 55410; United States
- 44°54′24.50″N 93°19′46.38″W

Information
- Type: Charter school
- Opened: 2015
- Chairman: Ben Maurer
- Director: Miranda Morton
- Grades: K–8
- Enrollment: ~260 (2025–2026)
- Website: agamim.org

Agamim Classical Academy was a K–8 public charter school in Edina, Minnesota. Based on the classical education movement, it opened in 2015 in Hopkins, Minnesota, before relocating to Edina in 2019. The school closed in June 2026.

== History ==
The school was named after the Hebrew word agam ("lake"), using its plural form to mean 'lakes,' likely representative of Minnesota. Agamim opened in 2015 at 1503 Boyce St in Hopkins, Minnesota, with 74 students in grades K–4 and ten staff members. It was founded with the stated vision of cultivating "wise, grateful, and virtuous students dedicated to the pursuit of truth, beauty, and goodness for themselves and for our country." By 2019, the school had 300 students and 47 staff; after outgrowing its original building, Agamim relocated to 5300 France Avenue S in Edina, Minnesota in the summer of that year. Both locations are churches, including Kingdom Embassy Worship Center and Calvary Christian Reformed Church. In 2024, the school acquired a new playground.

=== Closure ===
On April 1, 2026, eleven years after its founding, Agamim announced it would be closing during the summer after the 2025–2026 school year in an email sent to community members. The stated reasons include financial issues, declining enrollment numbers, and rising operational costs. On March 30, the school board voted to end operations effective June 30.

== Information ==
Agamim Classical Academy followed a classical education model based on the trivium, which divides learning into three parts: grammar, logic, and rhetoric. It emphasized E pluribus unum, the motto of the United States, meaning "out of many, one," and taught American values. The school's curriculum was built on the Core Knowledge Sequence, which provides a specific, grade-by-grade outline of topics in history, geography, science, literature, language arts, and fine arts, and it uses Saxon math. Reading followed the Groves Method, a phonics-based curriculum developed by the Groves Learning Organization to support both general education students and those with dyslexia. The classical languages of Hebrew, Latin, and Greek were taught at the school.

Outside of its core academics, Agamim promoted character formation through five "foundational virtues": fortitude, gratitude, joyfulness, temperance, and wisdom. These virtues were highly ingrained into daily school life and formed the basis of Agamim's disciplinary and cultural structure. Students were required to wear uniforms, typically consisting of red, white, or blue polo shirts and khaki pants, often accompanied by a fleece for warmth. Uniforms featured the Agamim logo on the upper chest.
