= Jaime Escalante =

Bolivian educator, teacher and mathematician

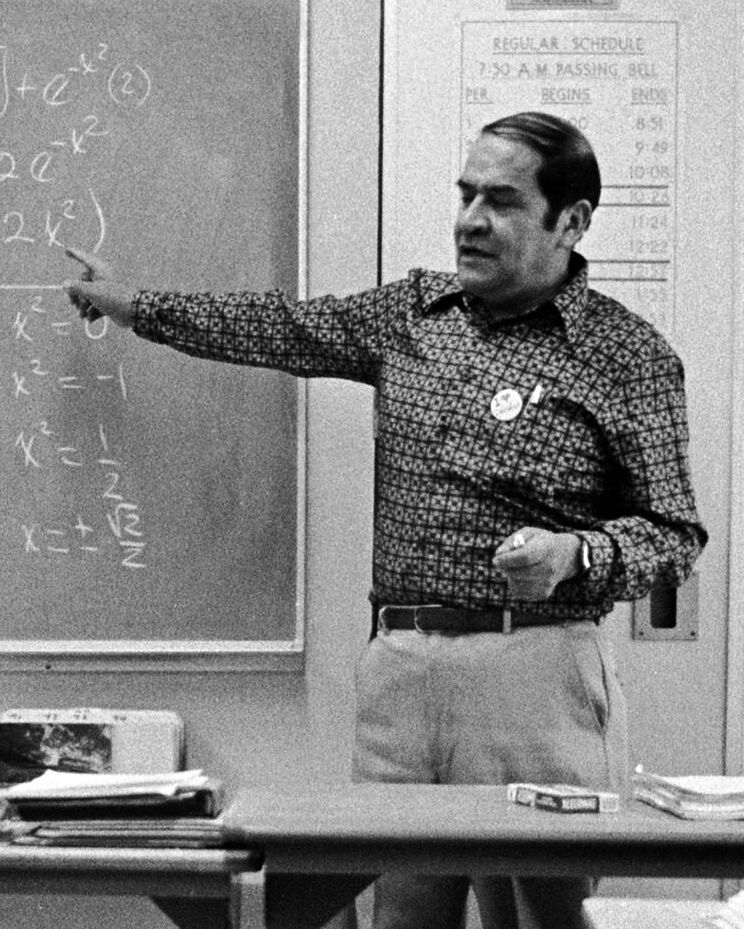
- Jaime Escalante in 1983
- Born: December 31, 1930; La Paz, Bolivia
- Died: March 30, 2010 (aged 79); Roseville, California, U.S.
- Resting place: Rose Hills Memorial Park
- Spouse: Fabiola Tapia
- Children: 2

Jaime Alfonso Escalante Gutiérrez (December 31, 1930 – March 30, 2010) was a Bolivian-American educator known for teaching students calculus from 1974 to 1991 at Garfield High School in East Los Angeles. Escalante was the subject of the 1988 film Stand and Deliver, in which he is portrayed by Edward James Olmos.

== Early life ==
Escalante was born in 1930 in La Paz, Bolivia. Both of his parents were teachers. Escalante was proud of his Aymara heritage.

== Early career ==
Escalante taught mathematics and physics for 12 years in Bolivia before he immigrated to the United States. He worked various jobs while teaching himself English and earning another college degree before eventually returning to the classroom as an educator.

External videos
- Excellence in Education, C-SPAN

External videos
- Technology and Education, C-SPAN

In 1974, he began to teach at Garfield High School. Escalante was initially so disheartened by the lack of preparation of his students that he called his former employer and asked for his old job back. Escalante eventually changed his mind about returning to work when he found twelve students willing to take an algebra class.

Shortly after Escalante came to Garfield High School, its accreditation became threatened. Instead of gearing classes to poorly performing students, Escalante offered AP Calculus. He had already earned the criticism of an administrator, who disapproved of his requiring the students to answer a homework question before being allowed into the classroom: "He said to 'Just get them inside.' I said, 'There is no teaching, no learning going on here. We are just baby-sitting.'"

Determined to change the status quo, Escalante persuaded a few students that they could control their futures with the right education. He promised them that they could get jobs in engineering, electronics, and computers if they would learn math: "I'll teach you math and that's your language. With that, you're going to make it. You're going to college and sit in the first row, not the back because you're going to know more than anybody."

The school administration opposed Escalante frequently during his first few years. He was threatened with dismissal by an assistant principal because he was coming in too early, leaving too late, and failing to get administrative permission to raise funds to pay for his students' Advanced Placement tests. The opposition changed with the arrival of a new principal, Henry Gradillas. In addition to allowing Escalante to stay, Gradillas overhauled the academic curriculum at Garfield, reducing the number of basic math classes and requiring those taking basic math to take algebra as well. He denied extracurricular activities to students who failed to maintain a C average and to new students who failed basic skills tests. One of Escalante's students remarked, "If he wants to teach us that bad, we can learn."

Escalante continued to teach at Garfield and instructed his first calculus class in 1978. He recruited fellow teacher Ben Jiménez and taught calculus to five students, two of whom passed the AP calculus test. The following year, the class size increased to nine students, seven of whom passed the AP calculus test. By 1981, the class had increased to fifteen students, fourteen of whom passed. Escalante placed a high priority on pressuring his students to pass their math classes, particularly calculus. He rejected the common practice of ranking students from first to last but frequently told his students to press themselves as hard as possible in their assignments.

== National attention ==
In 1982, Escalante first gained media attention when 18 of his students passed the Advanced Placement Calculus exam. The Educational Testing Service found the scores to be suspicious because they all made exactly the same math error on the sixth problem, and they also used the same unusual variable names. Fourteen of those who passed were asked to take the exam again. Twelve of them agreed to retake the test, and all did well enough to have their scores reinstated.

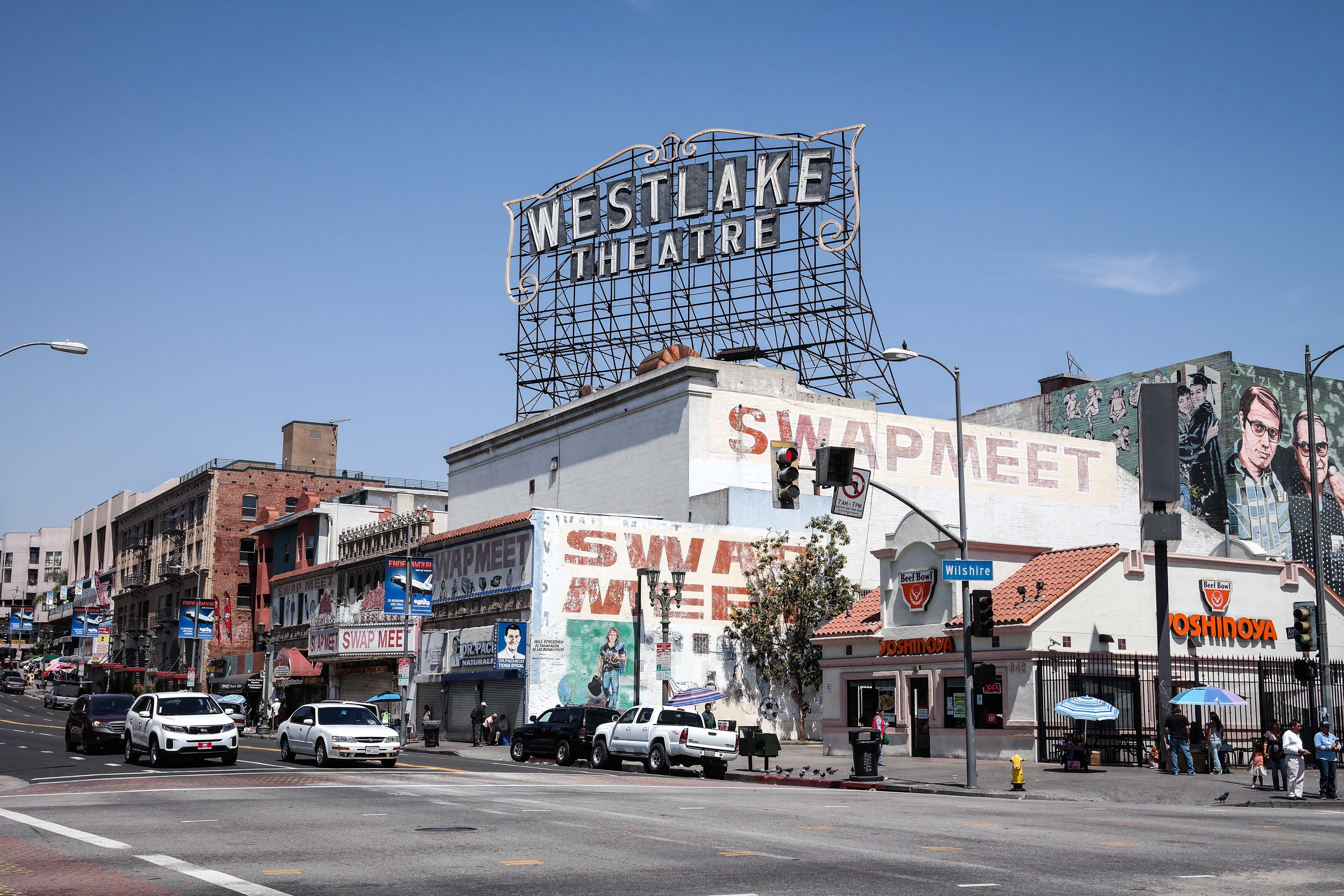
Westlake Theatre building, side wall mural of Jaime Escalante and Edward James Olmos.

In 1983, the number of students enrolling and passing the calculus test more than doubled. That year, 33 students took the exam, and 30 passed. That year, he also started to teach calculus at East Los Angeles College. By 1987, 83 students passed the AB version of the exam, and another 12 passed the BC version. That was the peak for the calculus program. The same year, Gradillas went on sabbatical to finish his doctorate with hopes that he could be reinstated as principal at Garfield or a similar school with a similar program upon his return.

In 1988, a book, Escalante: The Best Teacher in America by Jay Mathews, and a film, Stand and Deliver, were released based on the events of 1982. Teachers and other interested observers asked to sit in on his classes. He shared with them: "The key to my success with youngsters is a very simple and time-honored tradition: hard work for teacher and student alike." Escalante received visits from political leaders and celebrities, including President Ronald Reagan and actor Arnold Schwarzenegger. In 1990, Escalante worked with the Foundation for Advancements in Science and Education to produce the video series Futures, which won a Peabody Award.

Escalante has described the film "Stand and Deliver" as "90% truth, 10% drama." He stated that several points were left out of the film:

- It took him several years to achieve the kind of success shown in the film.
- No student who did not know multiplication tables or fractions was ever taught calculus in a single year.
- Escalante suffered inflammation of the gallbladder, not a heart attack.

Over the next few years, Escalante's calculus program continued to grow.

== Departure from Garfield ==
In his final years at Garfield, Escalante received threats and hate mail. By 1990, he had lost the math department chairmanship. Escalante's math enrichment program had grown to more than 400 students. His class sizes had increased to over 50 students in some cases. That was far beyond the 35 student limit set by the teachers' union, which increased its criticism of Escalante's work. In 1991, the number of Garfield students taking advanced placement examinations in math and other subjects jumped to 570. The same year, citing faculty politics and petty jealousies, Escalante and Jiménez left Garfield. Escalante found new employment at Hiram W. Johnson High School in Sacramento, California. At the height of Escalante's success, Garfield graduates were entering the University of Southern California in such great numbers that they outnumbered all the other high schools in the working-class East Los Angeles region combined. Even students who failed the AP exam often went on to study at California State University, Los Angeles.

Angelo Villavicencio, one of Escalante's handpicked instructors, took over the program after Escalante's departure, teaching the remaining 107 AP students in two classes over the following year. Sixty-seven of Villavicencio's students went on to take the AP exam and forty-seven passed. The math program's decline at Garfield became apparent following the departure of Escalante, Villavicencio, and other teachers associated with its inception and development. In just a few years, the number of AP calculus students at Garfield who passed their exams dropped by more than 80%. In 1996, Villavicencio contacted Garfield's new principal, Tony Garcia, and offered to come back to help revive the dying calculus program. His offer was rejected.

== Later life ==
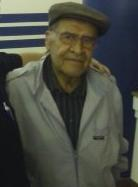
Escalante in the 2000s

In the mid-1990s, Escalante became a strong supporter of English-only education efforts. In 1997, he joined Ron Unz's English for the Children initiative, which eventually ended most bilingual education in California schools.

In 2001, after many years of preparing teenagers for the AP calculus exam, Escalante returned to his native Bolivia. He lived in his wife's hometown, Cochabamba, and taught at Universidad Privada del Valle. He returned to the United States frequently to visit his children.

In early 2010 Escalante made a final trip to the United States to pursue treatment for bladder cancer. As he faced financial difficulties from the cost of his cancer treatment, cast members from Stand and Deliver, including Edward James Olmos, and some of Escalante's former pupils, raised funds to help pay for his medical bills.

== Death and legacy ==
Escalante died on March 30, 2010, at his son's home, while undergoing treatment for bladder cancer. He was 79.

On April 1, 2010, a memorial service honoring Escalante was held at the Garfield High School. Students observed a moment of silence on the front steps of the campus. A wake was also held on April 17, 2010, in a classroom at Garfield.

Escalante is buried at Rose Hills Memorial Park in Whittier Lakeside Gardens. In 2016, the United States Postal Service issued a commemorative stamp in his likeness.

== Awards and honors ==
- 1988 – Presidential Medal for Excellence in Education – President Ronald Reagan
- 1988 – Honoree – Hispanic Heritage Awards
- 1990 – Honorary Doctor of Humanities – California State University, Los Angeles
- 1990 – Honorary Doctor of Laws – Concordia University, Montreal
- 1990 – Honorary Doctor of Laws – University of Northern Colorado
- 1990 – Award for Greatest Public Service Benefiting the Disadvantaged – Jefferson Awards
- 1991 – Honorary Doctor of Science – University of Massachusetts Boston
- 1993 – Honorary Asteroid (5095 Escalante) – International Astronomical Union
- 1998 – Honorary Doctor of Humane Letters – Wittenberg University
- 1998 – Free Spirit Award – Freedom Forum
- 1998 – Andrés Bello prize – Organization of American States
- 1999 – Inductee – National Teachers Hall of Fame
- 2002 – Member – President's Advisory Commission on Educational Excellence for Hispanic Americans
- 2005 – The Highest Office Award – Center for Youth Citizenship
- 2005 – Best teacher in North America – Freedom Forum
- 2014 – Foundational Award Winner, posthumously given to Fabiola Escalante (together with Henry Gradillas and Angelo Villavicencio) – Escalante–Gradillas Best in Education Prize
- 2016 – The United States Postal Service issued a 1st Class Forever "Jaime Escalante" stamp to honor "the East Los Angeles teacher whose inspirational methods led supposedly 'unteachable' high school students to master calculus."

== See also ==
- John Saxon (educator) - teacher that pioneered Saxon math to help students with difficulty learning algebra
- List of teachers portrayed in films
