= John Keefe =

John Keefe may refer to:

- John Keefe (baseball) (1867–1937), American pitcher in Major League Baseball
- John Keefe (actor) (born 1979), American film and television actor
- John B. Keefe (1928–1997), American lawyer, politician, and judge
