= John Saxe =

John Saxe may refer to:

- John Godfrey Saxe (1816–1887), American poet
- John Godfrey Saxe II (1877–1953), lawyer and member of the New York State Senate
- John Theodore Saxe (1843–1881), member of the firm of Saxe Brothers and professor at the Albany Academy

== See also ==
- John Saxon (disambiguation)
