= Washburn High School =

Public secondary school in Minneapolis, Minnesota

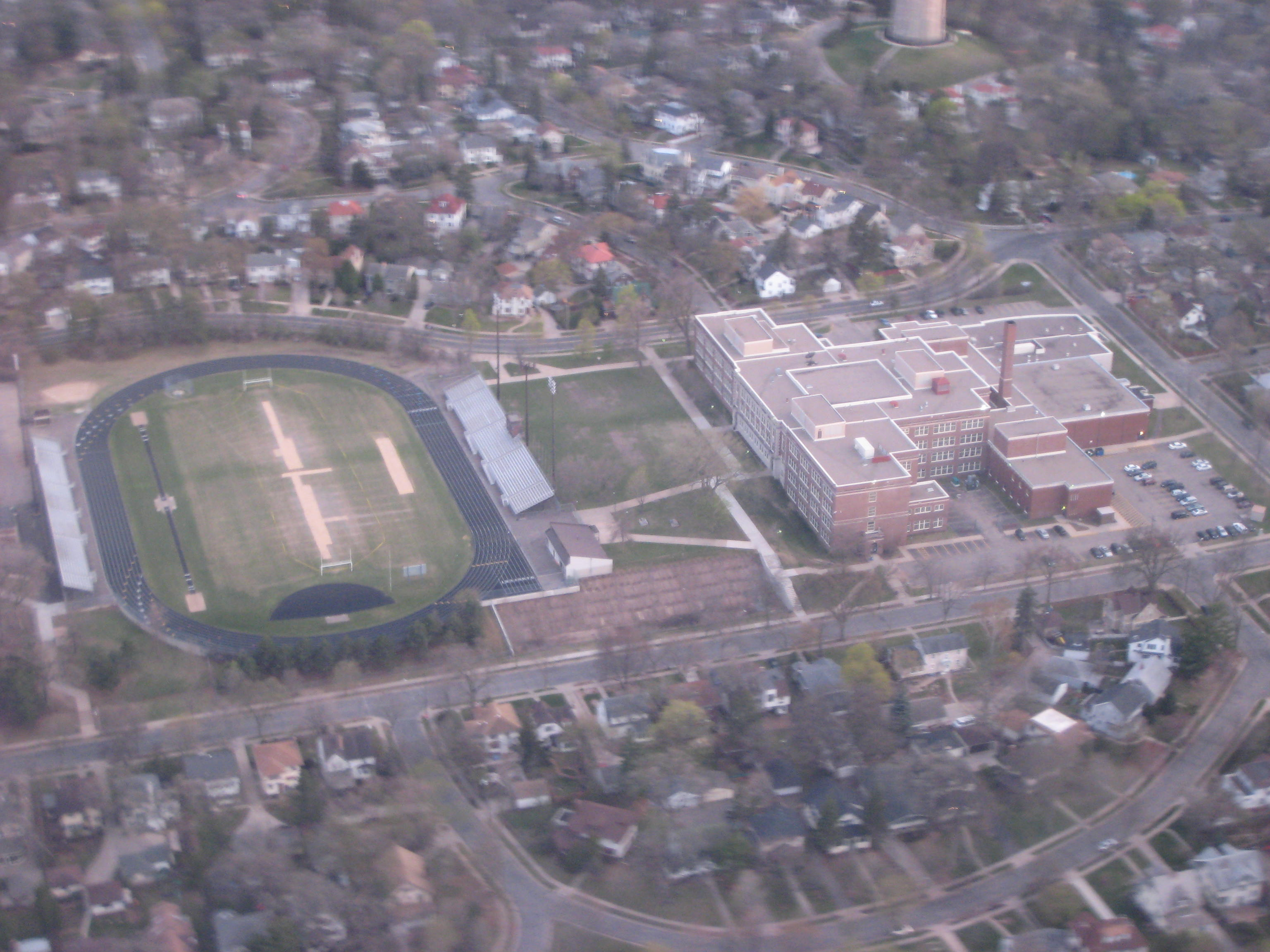
- Washburn from the air, 2007

Location
- 201 West 49th Street; Minneapolis, Minnesota 55419; United States; 44°54′47″N 93°16′59″W

Information
- Type: Public
- Established: 1924
- School district: Minneapolis Public Schools
- CEEB code: 241695
- Principal: Dr. Emily Lilja Palmer
- Teaching staff: 80 (FTE)
- Grades: 9–12
- Gender: Coeducational
- Enrollment: 1,589 (2024-25)
- Student to teacher ratio: 20:1
- Language: English
- Hours in school day: 8:30 AM to 3:10 PM
- Campus type: Urban
- Colors: Blue and Orange
- Slogan: Once a Miller, always a Miller
- Fight song: Washburn Down the Field
- Athletics conference: Minneapolis City Conference
- Mascot: The Miller
- Rival: Southwest High School
- National ranking: 1,495 in 2024
- Newspaper: The Grist
- Yearbook: WaHiAn
- Communities served: Minneapolis
- Feeder schools: 4 elementary schools (Lyndale, Barton, Hale/Field, & Burroughs) feed into Justice Page M.S. and then Washburn H.S.
- Website: washburn.mpls.k12.mn.us

Washburn High School is a four-year public high school serving grades 9–12 in the Tangletown neighborhood of Minneapolis, Minnesota, United States. By enrollment, Washburn is the largest high school in Minneapolis Public Schools.

== History ==
Washburn High School was built in 1925 to meet the demands of the growing South Minneapolis neighborhood. Construction for the new three-story building began in 1924 after the Minneapolis Board of Education purchased unused land in Washburn Park. Land next to the school was occupied by the Washburn Memorial Orphan Asylum, now torn down and replaced with Justice Page Middle School (formerly Ramsey Junior High School). Washburn is in southern Minneapolis's Tangletown neighborhood, at 201 West 49th Street.

Washburn opened on September 8, 1925, to 1,031 students. When it opened, it served grades 7–10 and added one year each year for the next two years. It served middle school and high school students until 1929. It became very popular, and by 1931, 2,370 students attended the school built for 1,500. The school has been expanded several times to meet the high enrollment.

The school is conventionally named after Cadwallader C. Washburn. The school has been heavily influenced by Minneapolis's milling empire. Its newspaper, The Grist, involves milling terminology; the school's colors, blue and orange, were those of Gold Medal Flour, made by the Washburn Crosby Company, a predecessor to General Mills; and the athletic teams' nickname is the Millers.

== Campus ==
Washburn is on a 4½-city block parcel bordered by West 49th and 50th streets on the north and south and Nicollet Ave. S. and Pleasant Ave. S on the east and west. Justice Page Middle School shares this parcel of land, with Washburn taking 2/3 of the space. In between the schools is A. E. MacQuarrie Field, which hosts football, soccer, lacrosse, and track and field competitions. In addition, the area between the school and field is a green space known as The Mall. Youth soccer teams, specifically the Fuller Soccer program from a neighboring park, use The Mall for games on weekends.

A tunnel under MacQuarrie Field connects the east side of Washburn and the west side of Justice Page. It transports heating and air conditioning between the schools. During the winter, snow melts directly above the tunnel due to the steam pipes within showing the tunnel's location. Decades ago, students used the tunnel during the winter when overcrowding forced Washburn to hold classes in Ramsey.

== Demographics ==
The demographic breakdown of the 1,582 students enrolled in 2024-25 was:

- American Indian – 2.0%
- Asian/Pacific islanders – 2.6%
- Black – 15.1%
- Hispanic – 24.0%
- White – 52.9%
- Multiracial – 3.4%

About 40% of the students are eligible for educational benefits (formerly free or reduced cost lunch). This is a Title I school.

== Staff ==
Dr. Emily Lilja Palmer was named the principal of Washburn in 2018 after 5 years as principal of Sanford Middle School.In 2025 Dr.Palmer completed her time at Washburn and the school introduced Dr. Alisha Raabe as its new principal.

During the 2024-25 school year, Washburn employed 132 staff members, of whom 80 were teachers. The student to teacher ratio was 20:1, with an October 1 student count of 1,582.

=== Past principals ===
1925–present
Washburn High School Principals
1925–44	A. E. MacQuarrie
1944–57	Leonard Fleenor
1957–72	Carl Anderson
1972–79	Dr. Roland DeLapp
1979–82	Dean Berntsen
1982	Wayne Nelson
1983–86	Don Burton
1986 (Spring)	Ingve Magnusson
1986–87	Robert Lynch
1987–89	John Dyzacky
1989–91	Dr. Rosa Smith
1992–94	Dr. Andre Lewis
1994–98	Ronald Chall
1998–99	Debora Brooks-Golden
1999–2000	Dr. Joyce Lewis Lake
2000–2007	Dr. Steven Couture
2007–2013 (April)	Carol Markham-Cousins
2013 (Spring)	Craig Vana
2013–2014	Linda Conley (interim)
2014–2018	Rhonda Dean
2018–2025	Dr. Emily Lilja Palmer
2026-present	Dr. Alisha Raabe

== Curriculum ==
=== College-credit opportunities ===
Washburn has an International Baccalaureate Diploma Programme (IBDP) for juniors and seniors. It also offers Advanced Placement (AP) and Concurrent Enrollment classes for 10th- through 12th-grade students to earn college credit free of charge. It uses schoolwide advisory programs to form relationships for each student. In addition, Washburn students can apply for and enroll in PSEO classes at local colleges including the University of Minnesota, Minneapolis College, and more.

=== Bilingual support ===
Washburn offers bilingual support for students and families in Spanish and Somali, and English Language Learner (ELL) classes and support are also available for any student with a home language other than English.

=== World languages and fine arts ===
Washburn offers four world languages: Arabic, American Sign Language (ASL), French, and Spanish.

In the performing arts, the school offers Jazz Band, Wind Ensemble Concert Band, Orchestra, Beginning Choir, Intermediate Choir, Advanced Choir “Miller Voices”, Guitar, Piano, Music Production and Blackbox Theater.

Visual Arts courses offered include Studio Art, Painting, Drawing, Ceramics and IB Art. Both visual and performing arts options are available after school as well.

== Extracurricular activities ==
In line with Washburn's three pillars of academics, arts and athletics, there are many opportunities in these areas in and beyond the classroom.

=== Athletics ===
Washburn is a member of the Minnesota State High School League and offers all available Boys and Girls varsity level sports, including:

- Boys' athletics
  - Baseball
  - Basketball
  - Cross country running
  - Cross country skiing
  - Football
  - Golf
  - Hockey (Citywide team)
  - Lacrosse (Citywide team)
  - Soccer
  - Swimming
  - Tennis
  - Track and field
  - Volleyball
  - Wrestling
- Girls' athletics
  - Badminton
  - Basketball
  - Cross country running
  - Cross country skiing
  - Flag Football
  - Golf
  - Gymnastics
  - Hockey (Citywide team)
  - Lacrosse (Citywide team)
  - Soccer
  - Softball
  - Swimming
  - Tennis
  - Track and field
  - Volleyball

=== Theater ===
Washburn offers Blackbox theater classes, which give performances of student-created works and after-school productions that are open to all students. Blackbox students perform twice a year at the Rarig Theater on the UMN campus as part of a long-standing partnership.

Washburn after-school theater productions typically include a play or musical in the fall, a larger Spotlight production in the spring, and participates in the MSHSL One-Act Play competition in the winter.

== Fresh start ==
In March 2008, the Minneapolis Board of Education announced that Washburn would be one of two high schools in the Minneapolis Public Schools Fresh Start program. Along with Edison High School, Washburn hired new teachers and staff and examined its curriculum. These changes were part of a nine-point plan by the Minneapolis school board to alleviate budget problems and prepare 80% of graduates for college. Principal Carol Markham-Cousins returned to lead the school, with the rest of the teaching staff required to apply for rehire.

On May 14, 2008, Markham-Cousins sent letters to students and family members explaining the reasons for the Fresh Start. She cited graduation rates and college preparation as two reasons. The same day, students staged a walk-out in protest of the program. Students drew with chalk on the sidewalk in front of the school in support of the teachers.

About 30% of the faculty was retained, with the rest of the positions filled by new staff. In the years following, the school grew from under 1000 students in 2007 to almost 1700 in 2019.

== Notable alumni ==
- Russ Anderson — Class of 1973, hockey star at University of Minnesota and in NHL; married Miss America 1977 Dorothy Benham
- James Arness — Class of 1942, film and television actor most famous for portraying Marshal Matt Dillon on long-running TV series Gunsmoke
- Garrett Bender - Class of 2009, United States national rugby union team
- Patty Berg — golfer, founding member of LPGA, inductee in World Golf Hall of Fame
- Bob Cabana - Class of 1967, astronaut, 2008 Astronaut Hall of Fame inductee
- Richard Carlson - Class of 1929, film and television actor with star on Hollywood Walk of Fame
- Arlene Dahl — Class of 1943, film and television actress, former MGM contract star who achieved notability during the 1950s; mother of actor Lorenzo Lamas
- Sean Daley — best known as Slug, member of hip-hop duo Atmosphere
- Kathryn Finney — author, NBC Today Show correspondent, social media influencer
- Ra'Shede Hageman — class of 2009, NFL player, Atlanta Falcons
- Jimmy Jam Harris — Grammy-winning musician, songwriter and producer
- Fardosa Hassan — class of 2008, chaplain at Augsburg University
- Ryan Hoag – football player drafted by Oakland Raiders in 2003 (currently the boys' varsity tennis coach at Washburn)
- R. L. Huggar — best known as R.L., frontman of Next
- Bishop Kaun - professional wrestler
- John B. Keefe - Minnesota state legislator, lawyer, and judge.
- Ralph Lemon — artist
- Dave Moore — local newscaster
- Van Nelson - Class of 1964, Olympic long distance runner and member of St. Cloud State University, Minnesota, Drake Relays and Collegiate NAIA Track and Field Halls of Fame.
- Michele Norris — class of 1979, author and National Public Radio host
- Jeanne Phillips — columnist, Dear Abby
- Carol Spencer - class of 1950, fashion designer for Barbie
