= Adele Parkhurst =

American singer

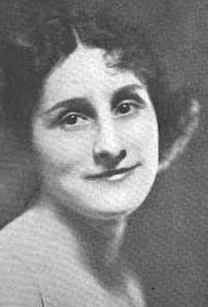
- Adele Parkhurst, from a 1922 publication.
- Born: Adele Bedelia Maloney; June 5, 1885; Hopkins, Minnesota
- Died: October 22, 1965 (aged 80); Dunedin, Florida
- Other name: Adele Maloney Orr (at time of death)
- Occupation: Singer

Adele Parkhurst (born Adele Bedelia Maloney; June 5, 1885 – October 22, 1965) was an American concert singer.

== Early life ==
Adele Bedelia Maloney was from Hopkins, Minnesota, the daughter of Michael F. Maloney and Albertina Erickson Maloney. Her father was born in Ireland and was a Union Army veteran of the American Civil War; her mother was born in Chicago. Adele Parkhurst sang at the Minnesota pavilion at the Louisiana Purchase Exposition in 1904, and trained as a singer with Wilfried Klamroth.

== Career ==
Parkhurst was a "birdlike and graceful" coloratura soprano, who gave concerts at New York's Aeolian Hall in 1920, and the Town Hall venue in 1921. She was soprano soloist at the Church of the Divine Paternity in New York City. A 1922 report described her as "one of the best singers of oratorio form of music now before the public." She sang in radio concerts, operettas, and operas later in the 1920s. She sang as a soloist with symphonies in New York, Chicago, and Minneapolis.

== Personal life ==
Adele Maloney was married Clifford Eugene Parkhurst, a naval designer and consultant, until his death in 1959. She later married Paul E. Orr. She died in 1965, aged 80 years, in Dunedin, Florida.
