= Kathryn Finney =

American author, entrepreneur, innovator, and businesswoman

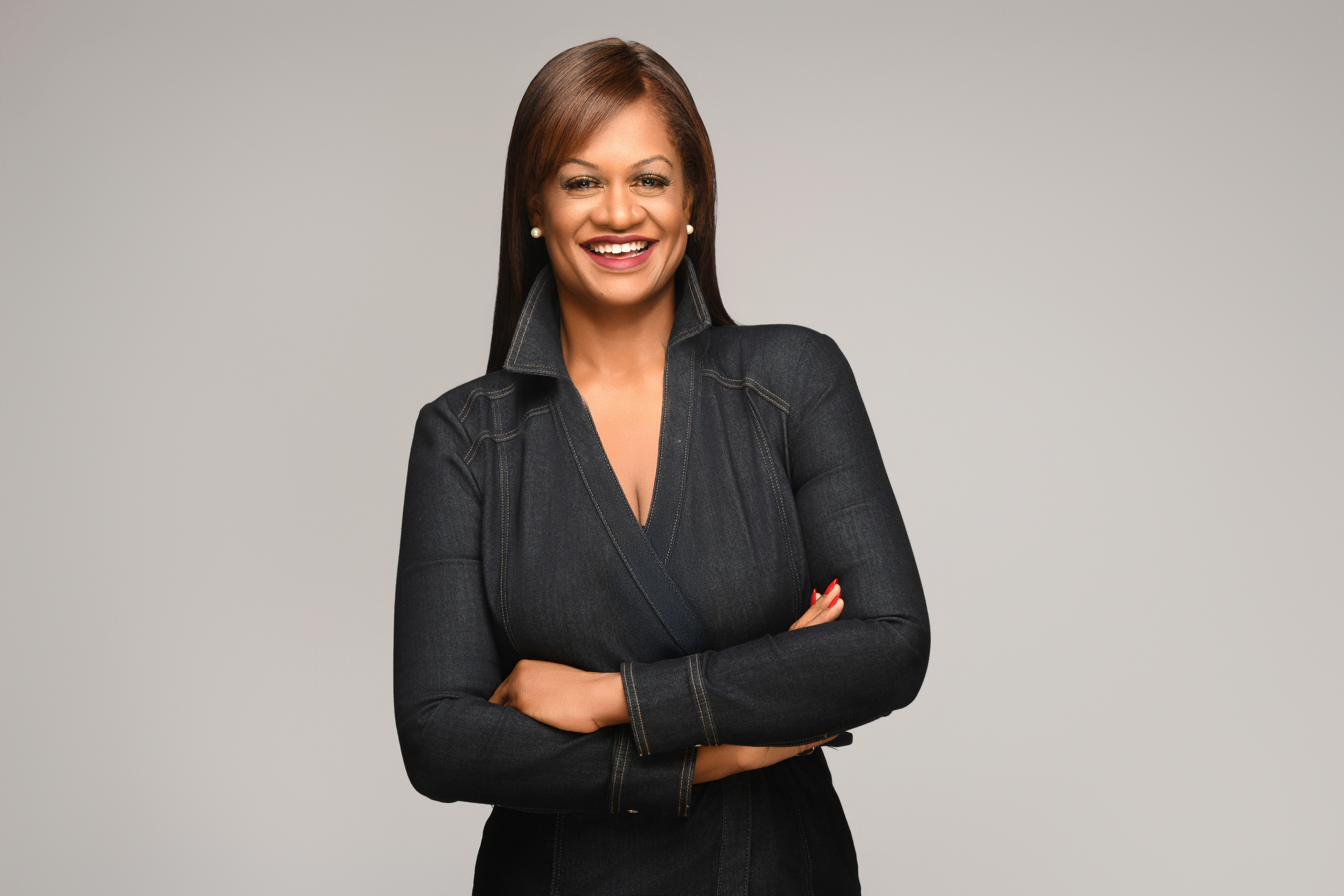
- Born: Milwaukee, Wisconsin, U.S.
- Education: Yale University; Rutgers University
- Occupations: Author, entrepreneur, investor
- Years active: 2003–present
- Known for: Founder/CEO of Genius Guild
- Notable work: The Doonie Fund, The Budget Fashionista, Digitalundivided, Build the Damn Thing (Book), Genius Guild
- Board member of: PRX, The Doonie Fund, Yale Chicago
- Honours: Honorary Doctorate- Mount Holyoke College, Heinz Award- Economy
- Website: www.kathrynfinney.com

Kathryn A. Finney is an American author, researcher, investor, entrepreneur, and businesswoman. She is the founder of Genius Guild, a $20 million dollar venture fund & studio that invests in Black entrepreneurs building scalable businesses that serve Black communities and beyond. She is also founder and Board Chair of The Doonie Fund, a social platform that provides micro-investment to Black women entrepreneurs. Finney first made her mark as a tech entrepreneur when she sold “The Budget Fashionista” after running the site-turned-media company for 11 years.

Appointed by the Obama administration to the National Council on Innovation and Entrepreneurship (NACIE), Finney is a former General Partner in the Harriet Fund, the first fund focused on women of color founders.

Finney's pioneering leadership in creating diverse and inclusive innovation ecosystems has been recognized by press outlets including The Wall Street Journal, Forbes, USA Today, Marie Claire, and Vanity Fair. She was named a recipient of PayPal’s inaugural Maggie Lena Walker Award, which recognizes and celebrates women who have created opportunities for economic advancement in underserved communities. She is a Falk Marques Group “Rising Star Award” winner, an award that highlights investors and managers who are thriving in the private equity industry. She was named one of America's Top 50 Women in Tech by Forbes. She is a 2016 Echoing Green Fellow and the recipient of numerous other awards and recognition, including The White House Champion of Change Award (2013), the Anita Borg Institute's Social Impact ABIE Award (2016), EBONY Power 100 List of the Most Inspiring African-Americans (2013), and AOL's Top Ten Women in Money (2010).

In 2015, Manhattan Borough President Gale Brewer honored Finney with "Kathryn Finney Appreciation Day." In 2017, Finney received an honorary doctorate from Mount Holyoke College.

== Early life ==
Kathryn Finney was born in Milwaukee, Wisconsin and grew up in Minneapolis, Minnesota. Her father, Robert Finney, was a brewery worker who went on to become a senior engineer at Microsoft and later EMC. He led the development of one of the first high school computer-based technology academies at St. Louis Park High School. His successful career in technology inspired Finney to consider a similar career path.

Finney graduated from Minneapolis’ Washburn High School where she was her Class President, inducted into the National Honor Society, served as a delegate to Girls State and Girls Nation, and received the Washburn High School Service Award. Finney was selected to be the commencement speaker for Washburn's 2019 graduating class.

Finney received her undergraduate degree from Rutgers University in Women's Studies and Politics. As a student at Rutgers, she was a member of the Rutgers College Student Government, Rutgers College Honors Program, the USA Today All Academic team, a James Dickson Carr Scholar, and a member of the Rutgers University Women’s Rugby team. She was also voted by her graduating class to receive the class of 1998 Alumni Award for Outstanding Scholarship and Community Service. During her junior year, Finney was a Washington Center Fellow and interned at the White House as well as with U.S. Senator Paul Wellstone (D-MN).

Finney earned a Master of Public Health degree with Honors from Yale University where she was a member of the Yale Women’s Rugby Team, led the Yale Domestic Violence Conference, and received the Courtland Van Creed Prize for Academic Scholarship and Community Involvement. She received the Weinerman Fellowship for her work as an international epidemiologist in the South African region.

In 2003, Finney launched her financial fashion blog, The Budget Fashionista, where she successfully helped to shape the influencer space to what it is today. In 2014, she became one of the first black women to sell her website and media company for a profit.

Prior to starting The Budget Fashionista, Finney worked for USAID and other nonprofits in Ghana, West Africa, and South Africa.

== Professional ==
=== 2020–present: Genius Guild and Build the Damn Thing ===
On the heels of the events of the Summer of 2020, Kathryn created Genius Guild, a venture capital platform and fund that invests in high-growth companies using innovation to build, grow, and promote healthy people, communities, and environments in underserved markets. Founded by seasoned investor Kathryn Finney and based in Chicago, the firm focuses on scalable business models led by exceptional founders. Its portfolio includes companies building solutions in digital health care, pediatric mental health, and supply chain systems. Genius Guild has also made limited partner investments in funds such as RareBreed Ventures and Capitalize VC.

In 2022, Finney released her second book, Build the Damn Thing, a guide for under-resourced founders on starting a successful business. Shortly after its release, it became a Wall Street Journal bestseller, and received positive reviews from Forbes, Porchlight, and Library Journal.

=== The Doonie Fund ===
In April 2020, Kathryn founded The Doonie Fund, which is named after her grandmother, with a $10,000 personal donation to support Black women entrepreneurs during the COVID-19 crisis. Since 2020, The Doonie Fund has provided micro-investments to Black women-owned businesses. Recipients of the Doonie Fund include snack company Partake and digital media platform The Plug.

=== 2012–2020: digitalundivided (DID) and #ProjectDiane ===
Finney founded digitalundivided (DID) in 2013 after hosting the first FOCUS 100 conference in October 2012 in New York City. The inaugural conference received support from venture capital firm Andreessen Horowitz, global advertising agency Ogilvy, and other top firms. The following year, the conference partnered with Google, American Express, and (for a second year) Andreessen Horowitz and Ogilvy. In 2014, its third and final year, American Express returned as a sponsor along with Facebook, Mobile Future, and the Portland Development Commission. At the close of the final FOCUS 100 conference in 2014, Finney announced the expansion of its FOCUS Fellows program into an incubator for Black women-led startups under the DID organizational umbrella.

Having collected proprietary data showcasing the state of Black & Latinx women startup founders across the United States, Finney released the pioneering research #ProjectDiane. The 2016 research report drew widespread buzz for disrupting the dialogue around women and entrepreneurship. #ProjectDiane is the first research initiative to explore the state of Black and Latinx women entrepreneurs. The report was covered by several major business and tech publications for shining a spotlight on the untold story about women of color founders and their startup journey. In 2018 and 2020, digitalundivided released follow-ups to the 2016 report.

In 2016, DID launched the BIG Innovation Center in Atlanta, Georgia. Touted as "the first-of-its-kind open innovation center dedicated to the future success of Black and Latina women tech founders," it houses the BIG Incubator (BIG), an incubator program for tech-enabled startups led by women of color. BIG is a winner of the U.S. Small Business Administration’s 2015–2016 Growth Accelerator Fund Competition. In 2018, BIG hosted its fourth Demo Day for its fourth cohort of women of color founders. In 2019, it welcomed its fifth cohort of diverse founders and expanded to Newark, New Jersey.

=== 2003–2014: The Budget Fashionista ===
Finney started "The Budget Fashionista," in April 2003 as a hobby before turning it into a media company and full-time career in June 2004. "The Budget Fashionista" was among the earliest fashion blogs, and was named one of the top fashion blogs on the internet. She was the first blogger to be credentialed for NYC Fashion Week, and one of first bloggers to receive a major book deal. From 2006 to 2008, Finney was a frequent contributor to NBC's The Today Show. She was the first blogger to appear on the popular morning show.

Finney is considered a social media icon and pioneer, having earned the monikers of "master of cheap chic" and "Scheherazade of the sales rack." She has been crowned one of America's best bargain shoppers (Style Network, 2004) and has appeared on several national TV shows such as NBC's Today Show, Fox Network News, CNN, CNBC, ABC's Good Morning America, and E! Entertainment. She has also appeared in numerous publications including Essence, USA Today, The New York Times, LA Times, and Redbook as a style expert on looking fabulous for less.

In May 2006, her first book, How to be a Budget Fashionista: The Ultimate Guide to Looking Fabulous for Less, was published by Ballantine Books, an imprint of Random House. It became an Amazon bestselling book. It is now in its 13th printing.

From 2012 to 2014, Finney was the Editor-at-Large at BlogHer, a global media group representing over 40 million women. Around this same time, Finney sold her media company for an undisclosed amount.

=== Awards received ===
Finney has received numerous accolades and widespread recognition for her work in building tech ecosystems in urban communities. In September 2023, she was named a recipient of the Heinz Award in the Economy, an award which celebrates the vision and the spirit that produce achievements of lasting good. In March 2021, she was named a recipient of PayPal’s inaugural Maggie Lena Walker Award, which recognizes the achievements of underrepresented women who have blazed new paths in their industries. Finney is also a Falk Marques Group “Rising Star Award” winner as well as a fellow of numerous institutions, including Eisenhower, French-American Foundation, and Echoing Green. She was named a 2021 Fellow of the Finance Leaders Fellows Program and a member of the Aspen Global Leadership Network, a worldwide community of more than 3,000 high-integrity, entrepreneurial leaders from business, government and the nonprofit sector in over 50 countries.

Other awards include: 2018, Forbes,"America's Top 50 Women In Tech," Marie Claire's "10 Women to Watch in 2016," Entrepreneur Magazine's "Woman to Watch in 2016," the Champion of Change Award from the White House (2013), "Kathryn Finney Appreciation Day" Borough of Manhattan (2015), the Social Impact ABIE Award from the Anita Borg Institute (2016), New York Business Journal's Women of Influence Award, UPSTART 100 List of Top Innovators, SXSW Black Innovator Award, The Grio 100, Ebony Power's 100 List of the Most Influential African Americans, Black Enterprise's "40 under 40" list, and induction into Spelman College's "Game Changers Academy."

=== Speaking ===
Finney is a much sought after keynote speaker at large-scale conferences, summits, and events. In May 2017, she delivered the commencement address at Mount Holyoke College, where she was awarded an honorary doctorate of humane letters. She has delivered keynote addresses at the White House, Forbes 'Women of Power", and at corporations like NIKE, Amazon, Google, and more. She is currently associated with the American Program Bureau.

=== Other roles ===
Finney has served as an adviser and board member to numerous startups and organizations. In 2021, Finney was appointed by FCC Commissioner Geoffrey Starks to serve on the DOER (Digital Opportunity Equity Recognition) Advisory Board. She is also a trustee of The Robert Finney Foundation, a foundation she started with her mother and brother to honor her late father. The foundation provides scholarships to African-American students pursuing studies in the field of technology. She serves on the board of PRI International–a global non-profit media company focused on the intersection of journalism and engagement to effect positive change in people's lives. PRI International creates a more informed, empathetic and connected world by sharing powerful stories, encouraging exploration, connecting people and culture. She has also served as an advisor for All Star Code, an organization focused on developing technical talent in young Black men, and MentorMe Inc., an SaaS based mentorship platform.

Finney is on the U.N. Goalkeepers' Advisory Group, a global collective of collaborative and diverse changemakers led by the Bill and Melinda Gates Foundation. The Goalkeepers is a community dedicated to achieving the 17 Global Goals for Sustainable Development, an ambitious blueprint for reimagining a better future for all by 2030, agreed upon by member states of the U.N.

== In modern culture ==
Finney is credited with coining several major shopping and internet marketing terms, including "The Budget Fashionista"; the term "Love what you buy and buy what you love," meaning that shoppers should focus on purchasing items that make them feel and look great; and "blogroots," which is a term meaning to aggressively market a product, book, or idea through networking with blogs.

== Bibliography ==
- Kathryn Finney (May 30, 2006). How to Be a Budget Fashionista: The Ultimate Guide to Looking Fabulous for Less. Ballantine Books. ISBN 978-0-8129-7516-1.
- Kathryn Finney (June 23, 2022). Build The Damn Thing: How to Start a Successful Business if You're Not a Rich White Guy. Penguin Books Limited. ISBN 9780593329269.
