= John Saxon (disambiguation) =

John Saxon (1936–2020) was an American actor.

John Saxon may also refer to:

- John Saxon (educator) (1923–1996), known for developing a new system of mathematics education
- John Saxon (wrestler), champion of the NWA in January 2016, see NWA National Heavyweight Championship
