= John Hardgrove =

American politician

John Hardgrove (June 24, 1836 – December 18, 1928) was a member of the Wisconsin State Assembly.

== Biography ==
Hardgrove was born on June 24, 1836, in County Clare, Ireland. He moved to Milwaukee, Wisconsin, in 1848 and to Forest, Fond du Lac County, Wisconsin, in 1851.

On December 8, 1862, Hardgrove married Catherine Heraty in Fond du Lac, Wisconsin. They had twelve children before divorcing in 1897. Following the divorce, Hardgrove moved to Hopkins, Minnesota, in 1901. He died on December 18, 1928, in Minneapolis, Minnesota.

== Career ==
Hardgrove was a member of the Assembly in 1883, where he served on the Insurance, Banks, and Banking committee. Additionally, he was Superintendent of Schools and Clerk of Forest. He was a Democrat.
