= Hopkins Commercial Historic District =

- U.S. National Register of Historic Places
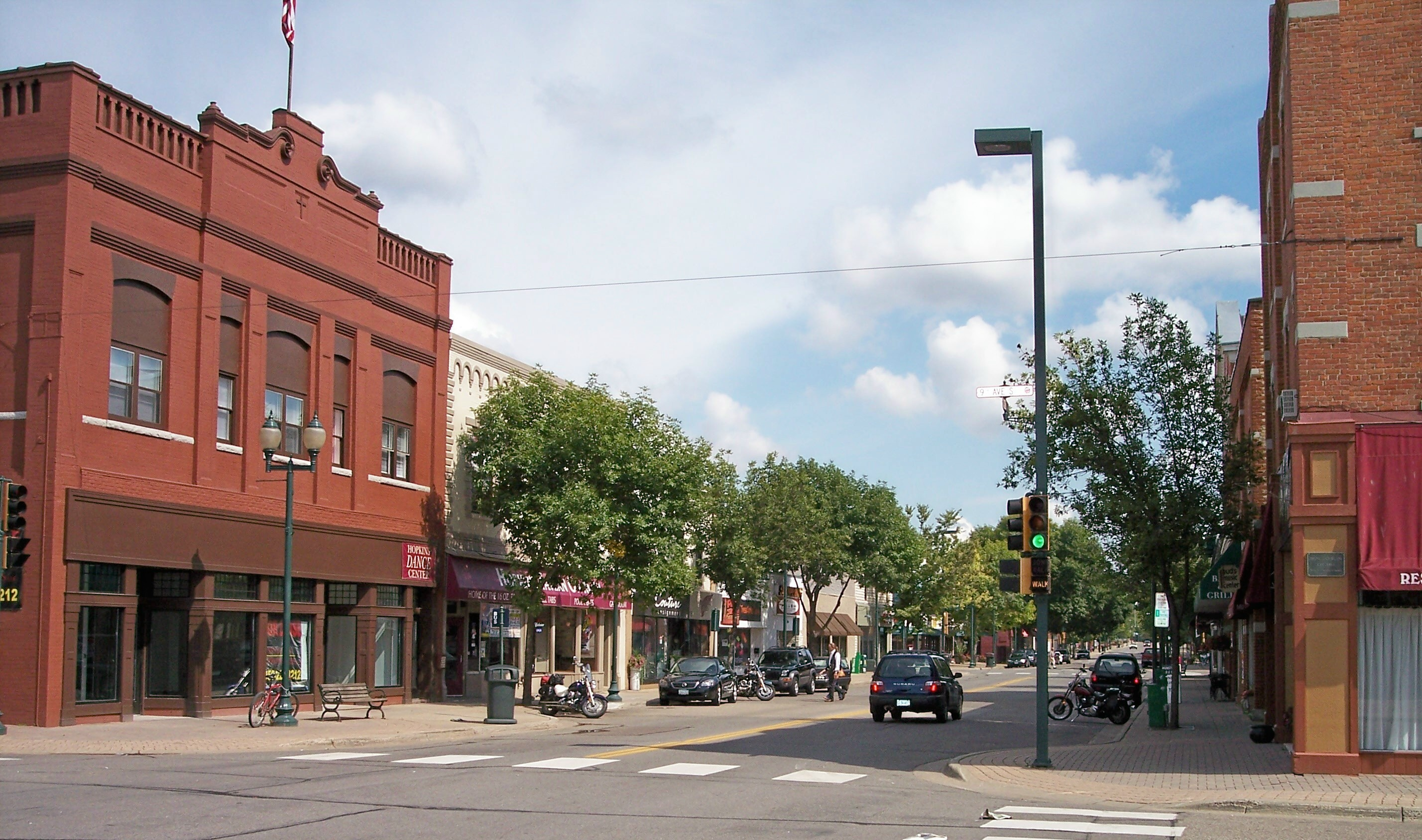

- Location within Minnesota Location within the United States
- Interactive map of Hopkins Commercial Historic District
- Location: Mainstreet between 8th and 11th Avenues North in Hopkins, Minnesota
- Coordinates: 44.92436°N 93.41144°W
- NRHP reference No.: 100007369

The Hopkins Commercial Historic District covers 2.5 blocks of Main Street in downtown Hopkins, Minnesota. The district was significant regional destination for agricultural, industrial, and commercial activity. Areas around Hopkins historically produced many raspberries and local industrial activity eventually contributed to Minneapolis-Moline which manufactured industrial machinery. At the peak, 50 streetcars a day went down Main Street.

Downtown Hopkins is about a five-minute walk away or .25 miles (0.40 km) from the future Downtown Hopkins station on the Metro Green Line Extension. There are 32 contributing properties, 5 non-contributing properties and one non-contributing site.

The district was listed on the National Register in January 2022. The nomination was done by the city of Hopkins and the Metro Green Line Extension project office. A public celebration featuring Dean Phillips and Ilhan Omar was held in April 2022 to commemorate the district joining the National Register.
