= Hopkins, Minnesota =

City in Minnesota, United States

- City
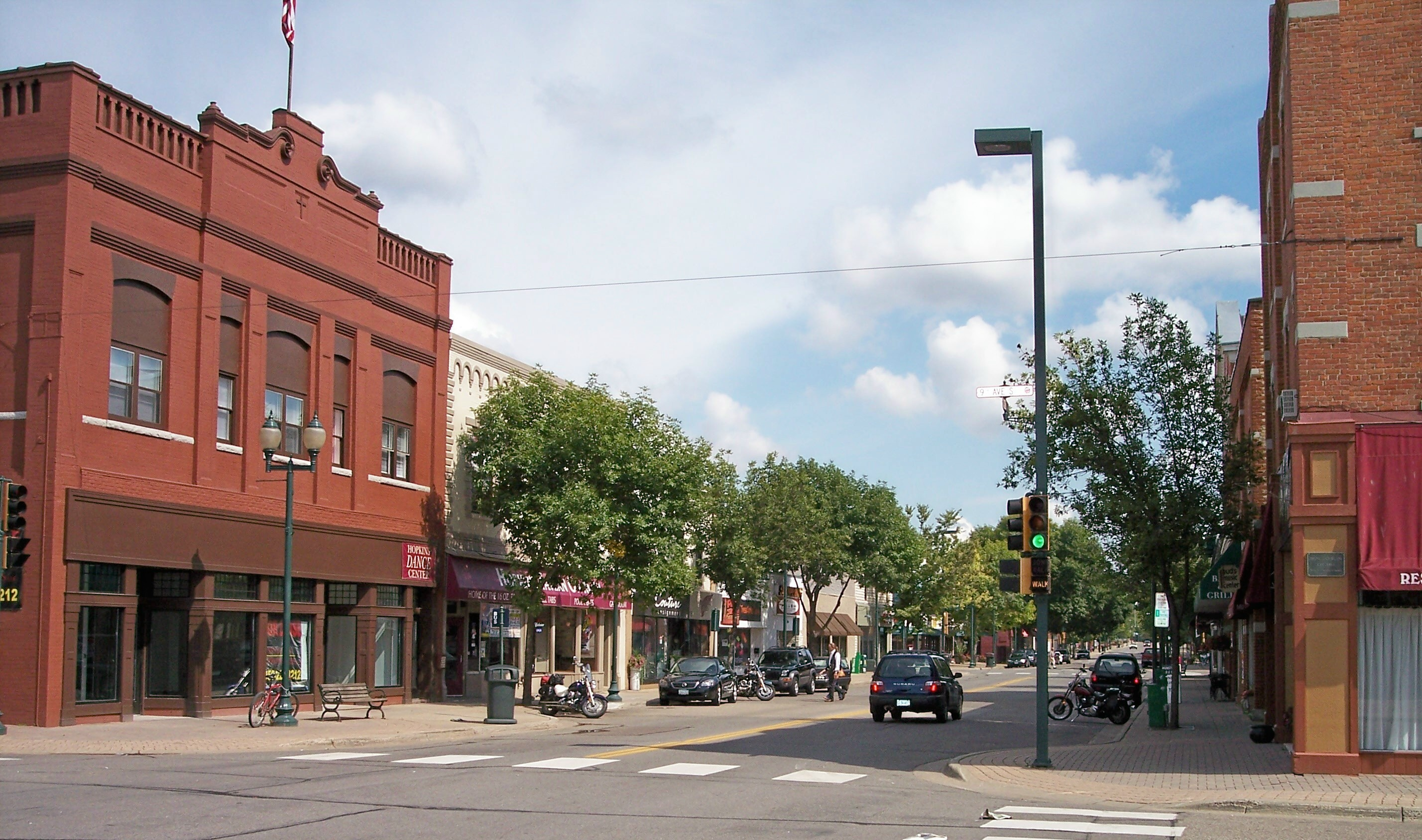
- Downtown Hopkins

- Logo

- Location of Hopkins within Hennepin County, Minnesota
- Coordinates: 44°55′50.77″N 93°24′6.09″W
- Country: United States
- State: Minnesota
- County: Hennepin
- Founded: 1852
- Incorporated (village): 1893
- Incorporated (city): December 2, 1947

Government
  - Mayor: Patrick Hanlon

Area
  - Total: 4.09 sq mi (10.60 km^{2})
  - Land: 4.06 sq mi (10.52 km^{2})
  - Water: 0.031 sq mi (0.08 km^{2})
- Elevation: 1,027 ft (313 m)

Population (2020)
  - Total: 19,079
  - Estimate (2024): 19,462
  - Density: 4,697/sq mi (1,813.5/km^{2})
- Time zone: UTC-6 (Central (CST))
  - Summer (DST): UTC-5 (CDT)
- ZIP codes: 55305, 55343, 55345
- Area code: 952
- FIPS code: 27-30140
- GNIS feature ID: 0645180
- Sales tax: 8.525%
- Website: hopkinsmn.com

Hopkins is a suburban city in Hennepin County, Minnesota, United States, located west of Minneapolis. The population was 19,079 at the 2020 census. The city is four square miles in size and is surrounded by the larger suburban communities of Minnetonka, Saint Louis Park, and Edina. The city's main street was added to the National Register of Historic Places in 2022 as the Hopkins Commercial Historic District.

== Geography ==
According to the United States Census Bureau, the city has a total area of 4.09 square miles (10.59 km^{2}), of which 4.06 square miles (10.52 km^{2}) is land and 0.03 square miles (0.08 km^{2}) is water. There are several small ponds on the western side of Hopkins, and creeks to the north and south. One of these creeks includes Minnehaha Creek. The north branch of Nine Mile Creek has its headwaters in Hopkins at the intersection of 13th Avenue South and Excelsior Boulevard.

The southern end of Hopkins is adjacent to main line of the Twin Cities and Western Railroad. Two main highways, U.S. Route 169 and Minnesota State Highway 7, service the Hopkin's area.

Hopkins will have three stations on the Metro Green Line Extension. There will be stations at Shady Oak Road, Downtown Hopkins, and at Blake Road.

== Demographics ==
Historical population
Census	Pop.	Note	%±
1900	1,648		—
1910	3,022		83.4%
1920	3,055		1.1%
1930	3,834		25.5%
1940	4,100		6.9%
1950	7,595		85.2%
1960	11,370		49.7%
1970	13,428		18.1%
1980	15,336		14.2%
1990	16,534		7.8%
2000	17,145		3.7%
2010	17,591		2.6%
2020	19,079		8.5%
2024 (est.)	19,462		2.0%
U.S. Decennial Census; 2020 Census

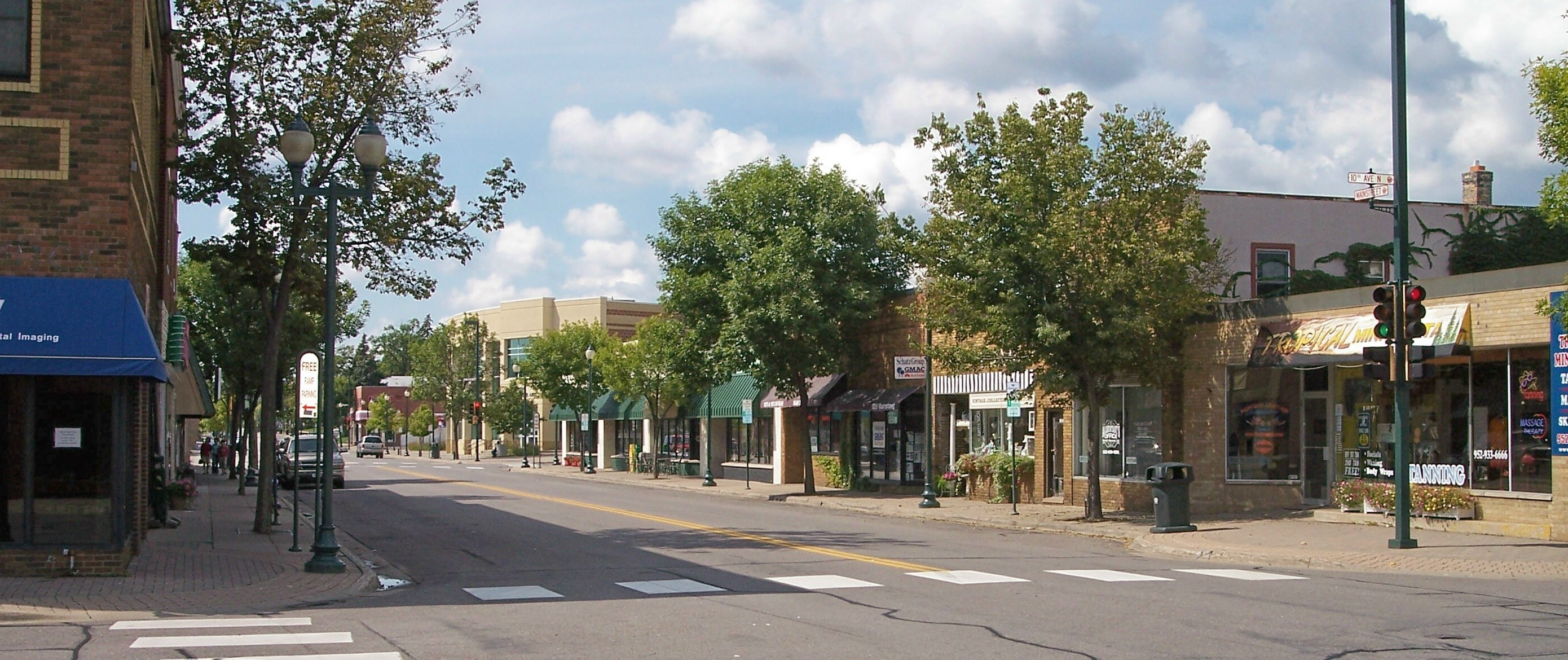
View of Mainstreet (the local spelling) in downtown Hopkins.

=== 2020 census ===
As of the 2020 census, Hopkins had a population of 19,079. The population density was 4,696.9 inhabitants per square mile (1,813.5/km2). The median age was 35.5 years. 19.6% of residents were under the age of 18 and 14.7% of residents were 65 years of age or older. For every 100 females there were 95.9 males, and for every 100 females age 18 and over there were 93.7 males age 18 and over.

100.0% of residents lived in urban areas, while 0.0% lived in rural areas.

There were 9,110 households in Hopkins, of which 21.9% had children under the age of 18 living in them. Of all households, 30.7% were married-couple households, 26.6% were households with a male householder and no spouse or partner present, and 33.8% were households with a female householder and no spouse or partner present. About 42.5% of all households were made up of individuals and 12.6% had someone living alone who was 65 years of age or older.

There were 9,475 housing units, of which 3.9% were vacant. The homeowner vacancy rate was 0.7% and the rental vacancy rate was 3.2%.

Racial composition as of the 2020 census
Race	Number	Percent
White	12,080	63.3%
Black or African American	3,541	18.6%
American Indian and Alaska Native	105	0.6%
Asian	1,118	5.9%
Native Hawaiian and Other Pacific Islander	14	0.1%
Some other race	800	4.2%
Two or more races	1,421	7.4%
Hispanic or Latino (of any race)	1,457	7.6%

=== 2017–2021 American Community Survey ===
The average household size was 2.02, and 22% of persons aged 5 years and over spoke a language other than English at home.

94.2% of people aged 25 years and over were high school graduates or higher, and 47.5% held a bachelor's degree or higher.

Among residents age 16 and over, 72.5% were in the civilian labor force, including 66.1% of females age 16 and over.

9.5% of people under age 65 years had a disability, and 6.9% of persons under age 65 years did not have health insurance.

The median household income (in 2021 dollars) was $60,824, the per capita income in the past 12 months (in 2021 dollars) was $40,770, and 11.8% of people lived in poverty.

=== 2010 census ===
As of the census of 2010, there were 17,591 people, 8,366 households, and 3,975 families residing in the city. The population density was 4,311.5 inhabitants per square mile (1,664.7/km^{2}). There were 8,987 housing units at an average density of 2,202.7 per square mile (850.5/km^{2}). The racial makeup of the city was 70.4% White, 13.5% African American, 0.6% Native American, 8.5% Asian, 3.4% from other races, and 3.6% from two or more races. Hispanic or Latino of any race were 7.9% of the population.

There were 8,366 households, of which 24.9% had children under the age of 18 living with them, 31.4% were married couples living together, 12.1% had a female householder with no husband present, 4.0% had a male householder with no wife present, and 52.5% were non-families. 43.4% of all households were made up of individuals, and 11.5% had someone living alone who was 65 years of age or older. The average household size was 2.07 and the average family size was 2.93.

The median age in the city was 34.4 years. 21.1% of residents were under the age of 18; 8.4% were between the ages of 18 and 24; 34.3% were from 25 to 44; 23.4% were from 45 to 64; and 12.6% were 65 years of age or older. The gender makeup of the city was 47.6% male and 52.4% female.

=== 2000 census ===
As of the census of 2000, there were 17,145 people, 8,224 households and 3,741 families residing in the city. The population density was 4,205.9 inhabitants per square mile (1,623.9/km^{2}). There were 8,390 housing units at an average density of 2,058.2 pe square mile (794.0/km^{2}). The racial makeup of the city was 82.61% White, 5.19% African American, 0.78% Native American, 5.92% Asian, 0.09% Pacific Islander, 2.58% from other races, and 2.82% from two or more races. Hispanic or Latino of any race were 5.54% of the population. 23.9% were of German, 12.4% Norwegian, 7.4% Irish and 7.1% Swedish ancestry.

There were 8,224 households, of which 22.7% had children under the age of 18 living with them, 31.4% were married couples living together, 10.5% had a female householder with no husband present, and 54.5% were non-families. 42.9% of all households were made up of individuals, and 12.1% had someone living alone who was 65 years of age or older. The average household size was 2.03 and the average family size was 2.85.

19.6% of the population were under the age of 18, 10.7% from 18 to 24, 37.2% from 25 to 44, 18.0% from 45 to 64, and 14.5% who were 65 years of age or older. The median age was 34 years. For every 100 females, there were 90.6 males. For every 100 females age 18 and over, there were 87.5 males.

The median household income was $39,203 and the median family income was $50,359. Males had a median income of $37,541 versus $30,687 for females. The per capita income for the city was $26,759. About 8.1% of families and 9.3% of the population were below the poverty line, including 12.3% of those under age 18 and 6.7% of those age 65 or over.

== Housing ==
Hopkins has a much lower homeownership rate than neighboring communities. The city's 39 percent homeownership rate is 22 percentage points less than the 61 percent of St. Louis Park, which has the next lowest rate among Hopkins’ neighbors. Other west metro communities fall in the mid-70 percent range.

Housing also tends to be more affordable than most west metro communities. Hopkins’ $225,200 median value is the lowest among its neighbors. The median housing value for St. Louis Park, which is next lowest, is 6.75 percent higher at $240,400.

== Government ==
=== City charter ===
Hopkins’ government structure is set by its city charter. Hennepin County district court judges appointed the first Hopkins Charter Commission on February 8, 1946, in order to create a proposed charter that would be voted on. The commission submitted the proposed charter to the Village Council on November 4, 1947. Voters approved the charter December 2, 1947. The charter has been amended numerous times since then, most recently in October 2012.

=== Government structure ===
The charter specifies that Hopkins use a council-manager plan. The council controls city administration but does so exclusively through the city manager. The charter contains an “interference with administration” clause that expressly forbids the council from telling the city manager whom to hire or preventing the city manager from using his or her judgment to make administrative appointments. It also prohibits the council from issuing orders to any of the city manager's subordinates.

==== Mayor and council ====
The council is made up of the mayor and four council members elected at-large. The mayor serves a two-year term in office. Council members have four-year terms—with two of the seats on the ballot in one election and the other two seats up in the following election. Regular elections take place in odd years.

The mayor votes on all motions before the council like the council members. The position is also the head of the city for ceremonial purposes, serving legal processes and martial law.

The mayor is paid $6,000 per year and council members are paid $4,600 per year. The current salaries were set in 1998.

===== Presidents and mayors =====
Presidents	Mayors
C.L. Hopkins (1893-1894)	Joseph Vesely (1948-1949)
Fred Souba (1895-1897)	W. Harlan Perbix (1950-1953)
D.E. Dow (1898)	Joseph Vesely (1954-1955)
Fred Souba (1899-1900)	Dr. F.M. Madden (1956-1957)
Paul Swenson (1901-1907)	W. Harlan Perbix (1958)
G.W. Moore (1908)	Donald Milbert (1961-1963)
Paul Swenson (1909)	John Hanley (1965-1969)
Emil Anderson (1910)	Henry Pokorny (1970-1975)
Paul Swenson (1911-1913)	Jerre A. Miller (1975-1981)
A.J. Hentschel (1914)	Robert F. Miller (1981-1985)
G.W. Moore (1915-1921)	Ellen Lavin (1985-1987)
J.W. Pemberton (1922)	Donald Milbert (1987-1989)
Paul Swenson (1923-1926)	Nelson W. Berg (1989-1993)
Anton A. Olson (1927-1928)	Chuck Redepenning (1993-1999)
M.B. Hagen (1929-1931)	Eugene Maxwell (1999–2015)
G.W. Moore (1932-1935)	Molly Cummings (2016–2019)
Anton A. Olson (1936-1937)	Jason Gadd (2019–2021)
E.V. Manchester (1938-1939)	Patrick Hanlon (2022–Present)
Dr. F.M. Madden (1940-1947)	

==== City manager ====
The city manager is the chief administrator of the City of Hopkins. The Hopkins City Council appoints the city manager for an indefinite period and may remove the manager at any time.

==== Subordinate employees ====
The charter specifies just two other administrative positions by name. It requires the city to have a clerk, who is subordinate to the city manager, and allows for, but doesn't require, a city attorney to advise the council on legal matters.

However, the charter specifies that the city manager can create city departments and divisions and alter them when necessary. Hopkins has seven departments, each with a department head that reports to the city manager. The departments are:

- Administration
- Community Services (Assessing, City Clerk, Inspections)
- Finance
- Fire
- Planning & Economic Development
- Police
- Public Works
- Recreation (operated jointly with Minnetonka, Minnesota)

=== Electoral politics ===
Presidential election results 1960–2024

Precinct General Election Results
Year	Republican	Democratic	Third parties
2024	23.9% 1,787	72.9% 5,450	3.2% 238
2020	23.9% 2,516	73.4% 7,742	2.7% 289
2016	25.7% 2,352	64.5% 5,903	9.8% 894
2012	32.8% 2,979	64.5% 5,864	2.7% 249
2008	32.4% 2,848	65.7% 5,775	1.9% 172
2004	37.2% 3,292	61.5% 5,437	1.3% 114
2000	38.6% 3,079	55.1% 4,388	6.3% 502
1996	32.5% 2,320	56.1% 4,007	11.4% 811
1992	29.9% 2,678	46.9% 4,198	23.2% 2,075
1988	45.8% 3,622	54.2% 4,285	0.0% 0
1984	51.5% 4,229	48.5% 3,982	0.0% 0
1980	38.8% 3,078	48.2% 3,820	13.0% 987
1976	47.7% 4,055	50.1% 4,258	2.2% 185
1972	54.8% 4,247	43.7% 3,387	1.5% 117
1968	45.1% 2,576	52.2% 2,978	2.7% 154
1964	41.0% 2,243	58.9% 3,220	0.1% 5
1960	55.0% 2,855	44.8% 2,327	0.2% 135
1956	62.0% 2,720	37.9% 1,663	0.1% 6

== History ==
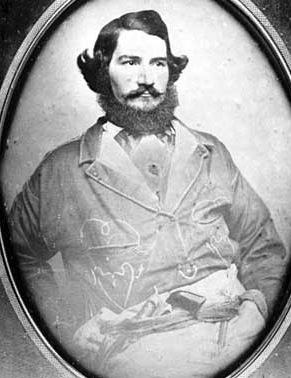
Harley H. Hopkins, namesake of Hopkins, in 1855, note the revolver.

The first non-indigenous settlers in the Hopkins area arrived in 1852 as land around the growing Minneapolis–Saint Paul area was opening up and being explored by members stationed at Fort Snelling. However, the roots of the town begin in 1887 with the building of the Minneapolis Threshing Machine Company, later called Minneapolis-Moline, to make farm equipment. At the time, Minneapolis Moline employed most of the Hopkins residents. In 1887, the West Minneapolis Land Company was founded and formed to build housing for the Minneapolis Moline factory workers.

In 1893, residents of Hopkins sent the Hennepin County Board of Commissioners a petition signed by 41 residents, asking that a separate village be formed from unincorporated portions of then-Minnetonka and Richfield Townships. Following an election, the community was then incorporated as the Village of West Minneapolis with a population of 1,105. The original village consisted of about three-square miles, and it has been enlarged by annexation to its present size of about four-square miles.

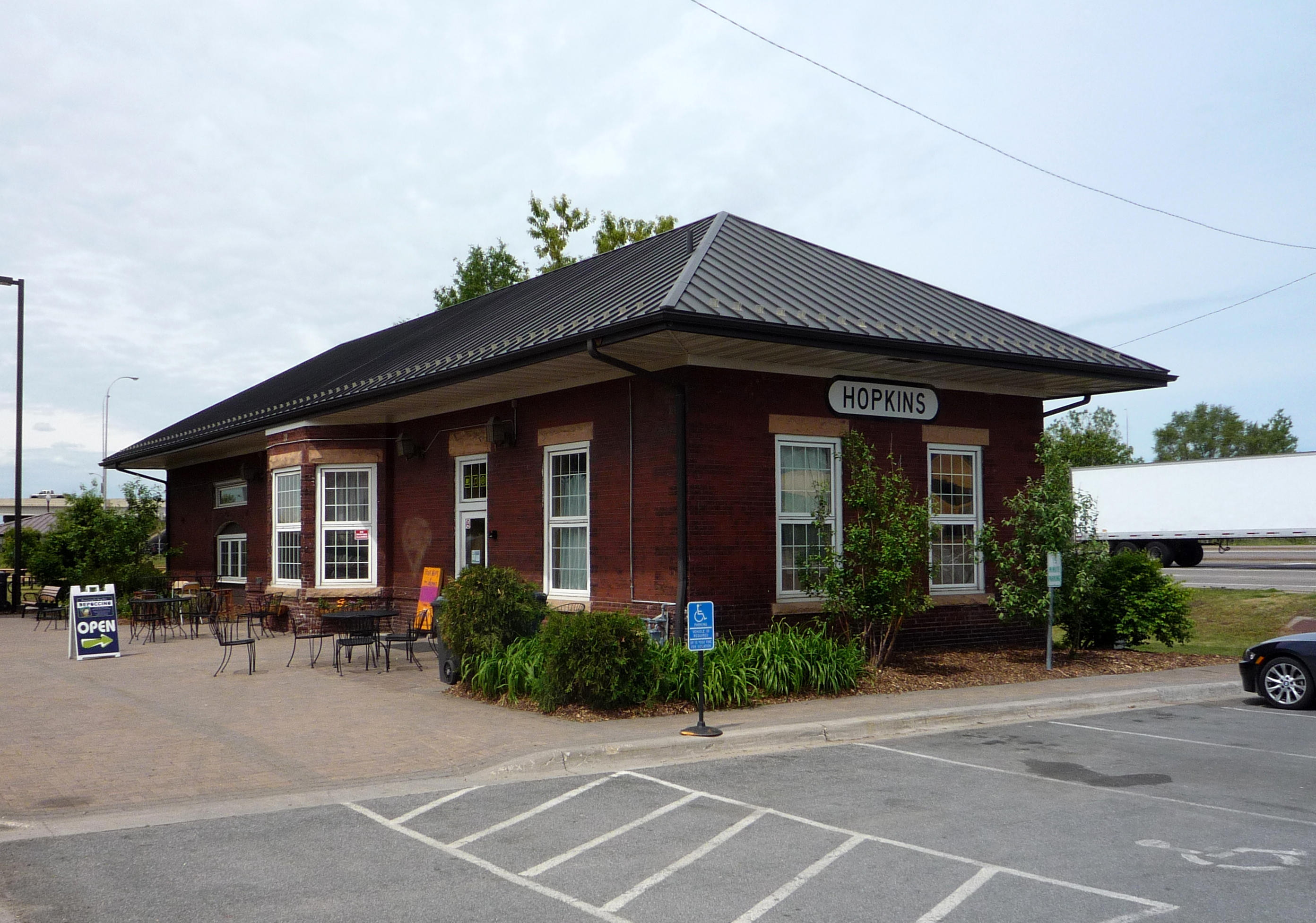
The Hopkins train station, which determined the town's eventual name, is now a student-run coffee house.

In 1928, the name of the village was changed to Hopkins after Harley H. Hopkins, who was among its first homesteaders and was the community's first postmaster. Mr. Hopkins allowed the town to build the train depot on his land in 1871 (now The Depot Coffee House) with the agreement that the train station would say "Hopkins" on it, and in 1872 the post office was established with the same name. People getting off the train assumed the name of the town was Hopkins and it stuck. In August of 1928, the council changed the name of the town to Hopkins and on December 2, 1947, the village became the city of Hopkins, upon adoption of a council–city manager charter.

Hopkins was the headquarters of Minneapolis-Moline, which was a large manufacturer of tractors and agricultural equipment in the United States until the 1960s.

=== Timeline ===
- 1852 – First non-indigenous settlers arrived
- 1862 – First school, Burnes, built
- 1887 – Minneapolis Threshing Machine Company built
- 1893 – November 7, 1,168 people incorporated the village of West Minneapolis
- 1893 – December 9, first city-council elected
- 1899 – Streetcar arrived in West Minneapolis
- 1928 – August 16, village name changed to Hopkins
- 1929 – Minneapolis Threshing Machine Company becomes Minneapolis-Moline
- 1934 – Hopkins business people organized the first Hopkins Raspberry Festival
- 1947 – December 2, Hopkins became a city through the adoption of a city charter
- 2022 - Hopkins Mainstreet designated on the list of the National Register of Historic Places

=== Hopkins Raspberry Festival ===
The Hopkins Raspberry Festival is an annual event in Hopkins. The Hopkins Raspberry Festival was founded in 1935 as a way to boost business during the Great Depression of the 1930s. A date of July 21 was chosen to hold the event to coincide with the peak of raspberry-picking season. The festival now takes place the third weekend in July every year.

The Raspberry Festival is overseen by a board of directors supported by many additional volunteers and local civic organizations each year. Since its inception, it has evolved into a dynamic community celebration with activities including music, sporting events, royalty coronations, craft fair, and parade.

=== National Register of Historic Places ===
The main street of Hopkins, from 8th to 11th avenues, was officially listed on the National Register of Historic Places in January 2022 as the Hopkins Commercial Historic District. The designation was revealed during a ceremony in April 2022.

== Education ==
=== Public schools ===
The Hopkins School District serves all or parts of seven Minneapolis west suburban communities: Hopkins, Minnetonka, Golden Valley, Plymouth, Edina, Eden Prairie, and Saint Louis Park. Approximately 8,100 students attend seven elementary schools (K–fifth grade), two middle schools (6th–8th grade), and one high school (9th–12th grade). Some students attend public schools in other school districts chosen by their families under Minnesota's open enrollment statute, as some students from outside Hopkins school district enroll in Hopkins schools on that basis.

Schools in the Hopkins School District
Elementary schools	Middle school	Senior high school
Alice Smith Elementary	Hopkins West Middle School ^{[1]}	Hopkins High School^{[1]}
Eisenhower Elementary	Hopkins North Middle School^{[1]}	
Gatewood Elementary^{[1]}
Glen Lake Elementary^{[1]}
Katherine Curren Elementary (Closed and being rented)
Meadowbrook Elementary^{[2]}
L.H. Tanglen Elementary^{[1]}

1. located in Minnetonka
2. located in Golden Valley

=== Private schools ===
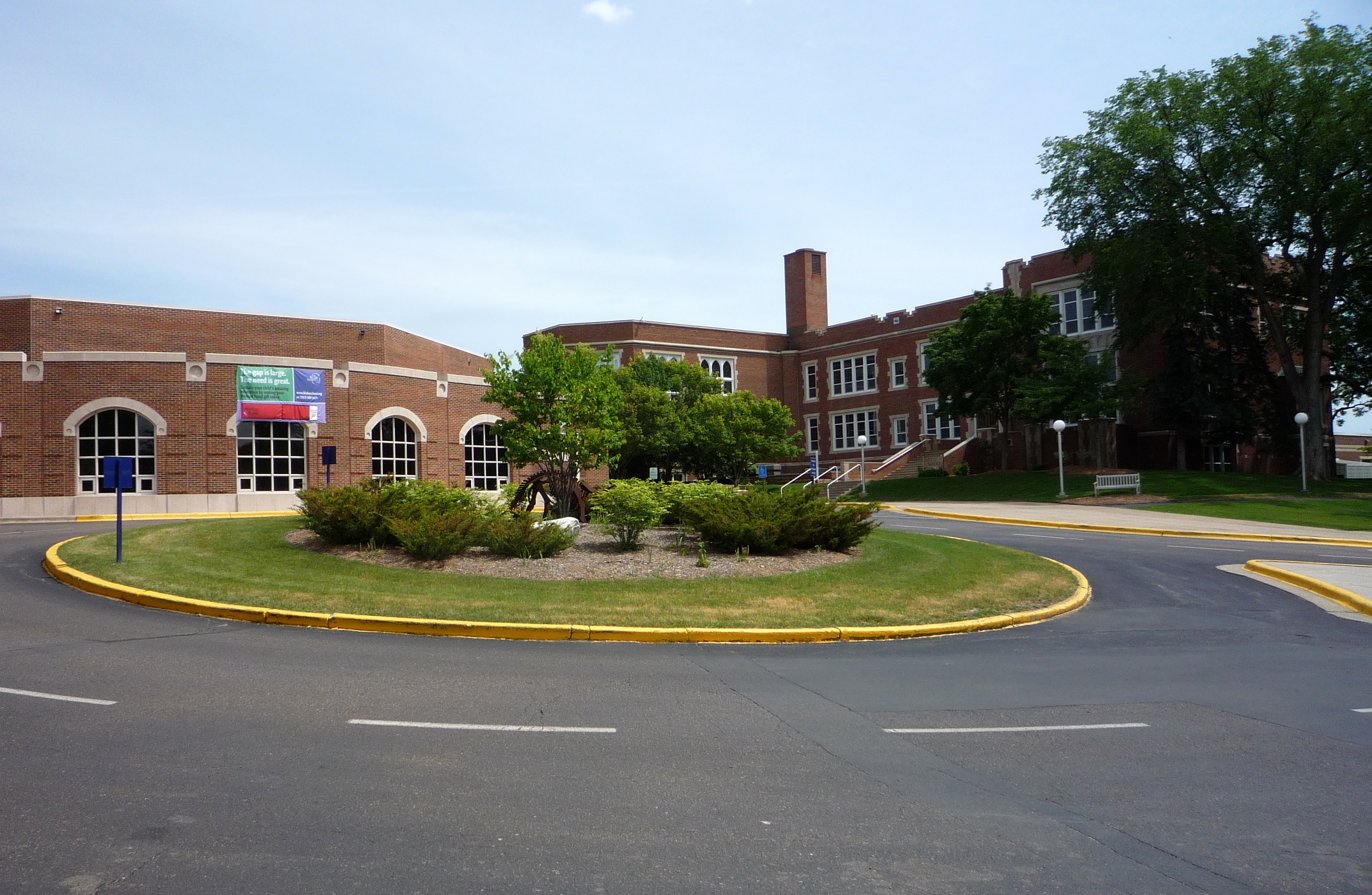
The Blake School

There are two private schools in Hopkins:

- The Blake School: A large private school with several campuses throughout the Twin Cities was founded in Hopkins, and the Blake Campus in the city houses both the Middle School and one of its two Lower Schools.
- Chesterton Academy: a Catholic high school.

Agamim Classical Academy was located in Hopkins.

=== Charter schools ===
- Mainstreet School of Performing Arts (MSSPA): A performing arts school that focuses on the three major performing arts areas; music, dance and theater. The school opened in 2004 and eventually moved to Eden Prairie, MN being renamed to Performing Institute of Minnesota Arts High School (PiM Arts High School). Grades 9–12.
- Ubah Medical Academy is a charter high school currently leasing space in the Katherine Curren Elementary building. The school was chartered in 2003 and was previously housed in Minneapolis.

== Notable people ==
- Nate Berkus (born 1971) - interior designer, author and television personality
- Travis Boyd (born 1993) - NHL ice hockey player
- Aaron Brown – broadcast journalist on ABC and CNN.^{[18]} Most recognized for his coverage of the September 11, 2001 attacks.
- Paige Bueckers (born 2001) - WNBA player for the Dallas Wings.
- Walter Bush – national leader in the development of amateur and professional hockey, elected to the U. S. Hockey Hall of Fame (2000).
- David Carr – media and culture columnist for The New York Times.^{[20]} Author of a memoir and best seller ‘’The Night of the Gun.’’ Early in his journalist career he was the editor of the ‘’Twin Cities Reader,’’ a weekly alternative newspaper in Minneapolis.
- Amir Coffey (born 1997) - basketball player in the Israeli Basketball Premier League; formerly in the NBA for the Phoenix Suns
- Courtney Dauwalter (born 1985) - ultramarathon runner and former teacher. The only runner in history to win the Hardrock 100, Western States, and UTMB in the same year.
- Daniel Grodnik - writer/producer of more than 65 films including, National Lampoon's Christmas Vacation, former Chairman/CEO of The National Lampoon and an adjunct professor in producing at the University of Southern California and Chapman University. Went to Alice Smith grade school and Hopkins High. Lettered in ski jumping.
- John Hardgrove – Wisconsin State Assemblyman.
- Samantha Harris – television hostess and actress. Her most prominent role was as E! Entertainment correspondent and a Dancing with the Stars co-host.
- John B. Keefe - Minnesota state legislator, lawyer, and judge.
- Jerry Knickerbocker - Minnesota state legislator and businessman.
- Peyton Manning - NFL veteran quarterback and two-time Super Bowl winner, attended Tanglen Elementary School in Hopkins during the time his father, Archie Manning, quarterbacked for the Minnesota Vikings.
- Adele Parkhurst - soprano concert singer in the 1920s.
- BeBe Shopp – Miss America, 1948.

== In popular culture ==
Mystery Science Theater 3000 was filmed in Hopkins in 1988 and 1989.
