= Ra'Shede Hageman =

American football player (born 1990)

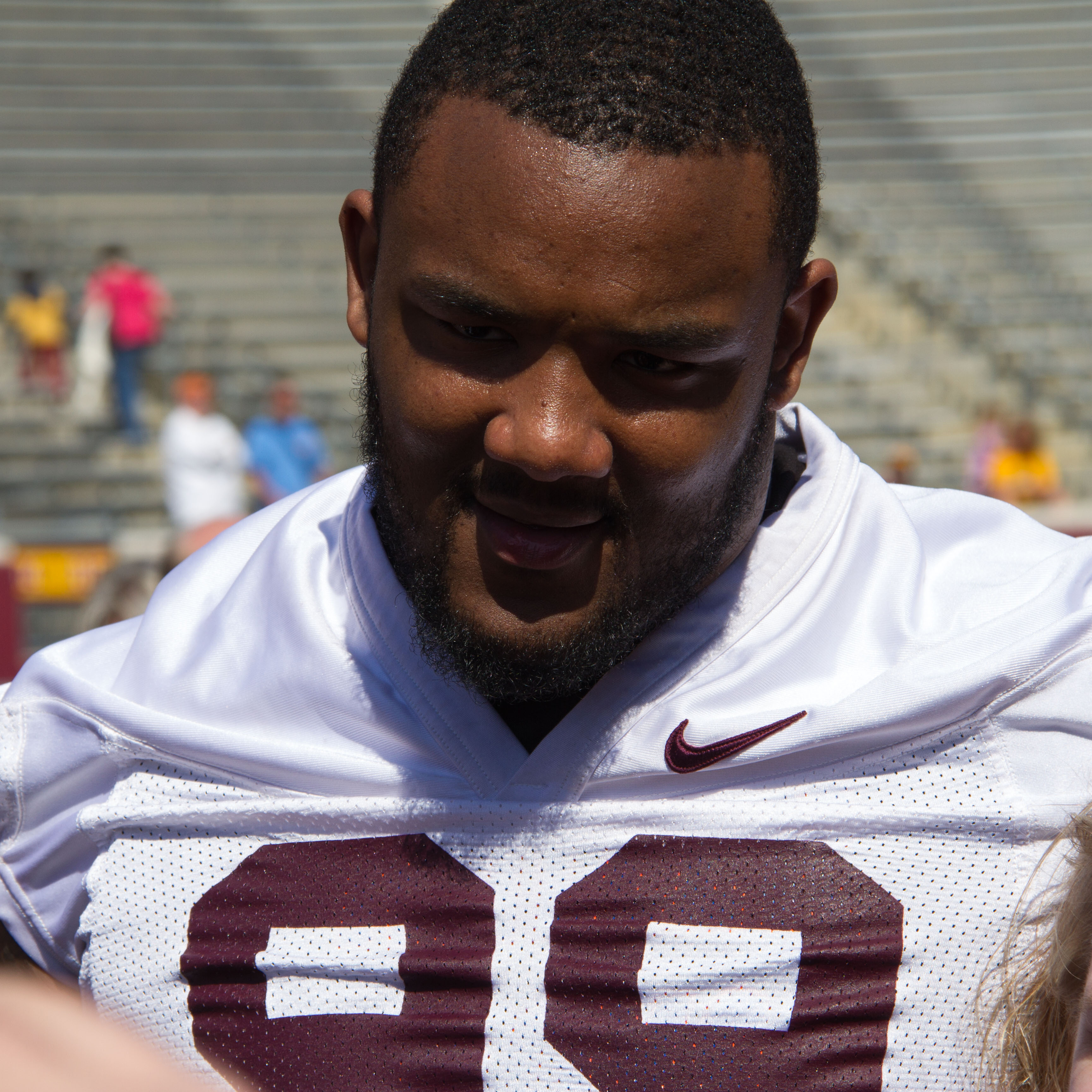
- Hageman with Minnesota in 2013

No. 77
- Position: Defensive tackle

Personal information
- Born: August 8, 1990 (age 36); Minneapolis, Minnesota, U.S.
- Listed height: 6 ft 6 in (1.98 m)
- Listed weight: 318 lb (144 kg)

Career information
- High school: Washburn (Minneapolis)
- College: Minnesota (2009–2013)
- NFL draft: 2014: 2nd round, 37th overall pick

Career history
- Atlanta Falcons (2014–2016, 2019)

Awards and highlights
- Third-team All-American (2013); First-team All-Big Ten (2013)

Career NFL statistics
- Total tackles: 62
- Sacks: 4
- Pass deflections: 1
- Stats at Pro Football Reference

Ra'Shede Hageman (born Ra'Shede Knox; August 8, 1990) is an American former professional football player who was a defensive tackle in the National Football League (NFL). He played college football for the Minnesota Golden Gophers and was selected by the Atlanta Falcons in the second round of the 2014 NFL draft.

== Early life ==
Ra’shede Hageman was born in Minneapolis with younger brother Xavier. Hageman traveled in, and out of various foster homes in Minneapolis-Saint Paul area, until being adopted at age 7. Hageman’s birth mother battled with alcohol and substance abuse and the birth father was never in the picture. In 1998 Ra’shede and his younger brother were adopted by lawyers Eric Hageman and Jill Coyle.

Hageman attended Washburn High School in Minneapolis, Minnesota where he played basketball and football. On the football field, he played tight end and as a senior he had 11 touchdown receptions. He was ranked by Rivals.com as the sixth best tight end recruit.

== College career ==
Hageman received scholarship offers to play football from Nebraska, Florida, Ohio State, Oklahoma, and Wisconsin, but opted to stay home and play for the University of Minnesota. Hageman moved to the defensive line as a freshman in 2009. He was redshirted that year. As a redshirt freshman in 2010, he played in eight games making five tackles. As a sophomore in 2011, he played in 12 games, recording 12 tackles and two sacks. Starting all 13 games as a junior in 2012, he recorded 35 tackles and six sacks.

== Professional career ==
Pre-draft measurables
Height	Weight	Arm length	Hand span	40-yard dash	Three-cone drill	Vertical jump	Broad jump	Bench press
6 ft 6 in (1.98 m)	310 lb (141 kg)	34 1/4 in (0.87 m)	10 1/4 in (0.26 m)	5.02 s	7.87 s	35.5 in (0.90 m)	6 ft 5 in (1.96 m)	32 reps
All values from NFL Combine

Hageman was considered one of the top defensive tackle prospects for the 2014 NFL draft. He was selected by the Atlanta Falcons in the second round, 37th overall in the 2014 NFL draft. In his rookie season, he recorded 16 total tackles and one sack.

In the 2015 season, Hageman recorded 27 total tackles and one sack.

In the 2016 season, Hageman recorded 18 total tackles and two sacks. At the end of the 2016 season, Hageman and the Falcons reached Super Bowl LI, where they faced the New England Patriots on February 5, 2017. In the Super Bowl, he had two total tackles as the Falcons fell in a 34–28 overtime defeat.

On September 2, 2017, Hageman was placed on the Commissioner's Exempt List as a result of domestic violence-related charges filed by prosecutors in DeKalb County, Georgia, following a March 2016 incident. He was later released by the Falcons on September 4, 2017.

On April 19, 2019, Hageman was re-signed by the Falcons on a one-year contract after being out of football for two seasons and the domestic violence charge against him was dropped. Not long after re-signing, it was announced that Hageman would be suspended for the first two games of the 2019 season due violating the league's substance abuse policy. He was waived/injured from the reserve/suspended list on September 16, and subsequently reverted to the team's injured reserve list the next day. He was waived from injured reserve on January 13, 2020.

In 2022, Hageman was drafted by the Dayton Beach team of the American Patriot League (APL), which was scheduled to begin play in 2023.

== NFL career statistics ==
=== Regular season ===
Season	Team	GP	GS	Total	Solo	Ast	Sck	FF	FR	PD
2014	ATL	16	0	17	13	4	1.0	0	0	0
2015	ATL	16	12	27	17	10	1.0	0	0	1
2016	ATL	12	4	18	11	7	2.0	0	0	0
Total		44	16	62	41	21	4.0	0	0	1
Source: NFL.com

=== Postseason ===
Season	Team	Games		Tackles						
Season	Team	GP	GS	Total	Solo	Ast	Sck	FF	FR	PD
2016	ATL	3	2	5	5	0	1.0	0	0	0
Total		3	2	5	5	0	1.0	0	0	0
Source: pro-football-reference.com

== Suspension ==
According to police reports, on March 21, 2016, Hageman allegedly entered the home of his girlfriend, Janeal Jefferies, and began throwing things at her, pulling her hair, and verbally abusing her in front of her son. When Jefferies mentioned calling 911, Hageman pulled her phone line and left the home with her cell phone and wallet; after she followed him outside, he reportedly handed her belongings to another man and pushed her down. Upon police arrival, Jefferies was observed to have lacerations on her left elbow and left hand. Hageman was charged with "interference with a call for emergency help, battery family violence and cruelty to children in the third degree" and was suspended by the NFL for 6 games in 2017.

== Personal life ==
In 2011, Hageman's son, Zion, was born.
