= John B. Keefe =

American politician

John B. Keefe, Sr. (May 28, 1928 – March 11, 1997) was an American lawyer, politician, and judge.

== Early life ==
Keefe was born in Chicago, Illinois. He graduated from Washburn High School in Minneapolis. Keefe served in the United States Army in 1946 and 1947. Keefe went to Macalester College. He received his bachelor's degree from the University of Minnesota and his law degree from William Mitchell College of Law. He lived with his wife and family in Hopkins, Minnesota and practiced law.

== Career ==
He served as the municipal judge for the city of Hopkins. Keefe served in the Minnesota House of Representatives from 1967 to 1972 and in the Minnesota Senate from 1973 to 1982. He was a Republican. He then served in the Hennepin County Commission from 1984 to 1994.

== Death ==
He died at his home in North Key Largo, Florida from a heart attack.
