= John Saxon (educator) =

American mathematician, engineer, airman and teacher

John Harold Saxon Jr. (December 10, 1923 – October 17, 1996) was an American mathematics educator who authored or co-authored and self-published a series of textbooks, collectively using an incremental teaching style which became known as Saxon math.

== Early life and military service ==
Saxon was born in Georgia to parents John Harold and Zollie McArthur Saxon. He graduated from Athens High School in 1941 in Athens, Georgia, and later attended the University of Georgia.

He earned a bachelor's degree in engineering from the United States Military Academy at West Point in 1949 and his master's degree in electrical engineering in 1961. He became an officer in the United States Army Air Forces, commanding a B-17 Flying Fortress in World War II. He later joined United States Air Force, flying 55 missions in a B-26 Invader on Night Intruder missions during the Korean War and reaching the rank of lieutenant colonel. In 1953, he survived a crash when a B-25 Mitchell engine failed on takeoff. That year, he also received a bachelor's degree in aeronautical engineering from the Air Force Institute of Technology at Wright-Patterson Air Force Base in Dayton, Ohio. Saxon also taught engineering at the United States Air Force Academy for five years.

After his retirement from the Air Force in the 1970, he settled in Norman, Oklahoma. He taught algebra part-time at Rose State College in Midwest City, Oklahoma.

== Technique development ==
Throughout the 1980s and 1990s, Saxon spoke out against mathematics education reform efforts that he believed would lead to a disaster in math and science education. He wrote or co-wrote a series of nine mathematics textbooks for kindergarten through high school which use an incremental teaching method often called "Saxon math". According to Saxon in media interviews from the 1980s and early 1990s and documentation coming with the high-school level textbooks, the inclusion of specialised and/or somewhat uncommon words such as "sciolist" in the story problems is intended as a vocabulary builder in preparation for the verbal section of the SAT and similar tests.

The basic philosophy of his approach was incremental development and continuous review. Incremental development meant that larger concepts were broken down into smaller, more easily understood pieces that were introduced over time; continuous review refers to the practice of concepts in cumulative problem sets once they were introduced. As a student completed a new concept, a brief review of the previous chapters and concepts were also tested.

Educators critical of his method felt that the lessons were too drill-oriented and time-consuming, did not allow students to use calculators, and differed from other methods by not encouraging teamwork or developing creative problem-solving skills.

== Publishing company ==
Saxon started his textbook publishing company when he was unable to find a publisher for his high school algebra manuscript. He mortgaged his house to raise the funds for it. He initially named his textbook publishing company Grassdale Publishers, after the name of his grandmother's farm in Georgia. Later, he changed the name of his company to Saxon Publishers. His first textbook was published in 1981 and had a very distinctive cover with a blue background and orange letters spelling out the word algebra.

Saxon came into national prominence by conservative thinker and publisher William F. Buckley. Buckley announced Saxon's success on the front page of the National Review magazine in 1981 with the headline "Supply-side Algebra." After his first book was published, Saxon published more books: Algebra 1 1/2, Algebra 1/2 and Geometry, Trigonometry and Algebra 3. (He later renamed his book Algebra 1 1/2 simply Algebra 2). His reasoning for titling his second textbook Algebra 1 1/2 is that a good part of the book was a review of Algebra 1 topics. Later, he co-authored his Calculus with Trigonometry and Analytic Geometry textbook with Frank Wang, then a graduate student in mathematics at MIT.

As Saxon published books that he authored or co-authored, he found other authors to write books all the way down to kindergarten level. Stephen Hake of El Monte, California authored books for 5th, 6th, 7th and 8th grades titled Math 54, Math 65, Math 76 and Math 87. Nancy Larson of West Haven, Connecticut authored programs titled Math K, Math 1, Math 2 and Math 3. Other books produced by the publishing company included Saxon Phonics and Spelling for kindergarten through third grade, as well as a book on physics.

Upon graduation from MIT with a PhD in pure mathematics, Frank Wang was asked by Saxon to run the day-to-day operations of the company. Wang started as a 16-year-old helper to him. A picture showing Saxon and Wang at John Saxon's dining room table in the early years of the company appeared in a half-page story in the Washington Post on Tuesday, 19 June 2001 (p. A9) authored by Jay Mathews titled "Not on the Same Page - Some Educations Say Saxon Math Books are Great Teaching Tools, but Many Systems Refuse to Use Them." Wang became the company's president in 1994.

Saxon died on October 17, 1996. The company that he founded was owned by his four children and celebrated its twentieth anniversary in 2001 at a gala at the National Cowboy & Western Heritage Museum. Frank Wang stepped down as CEO later in 2001 but retained the title of chairman, later leaving the company completely at the beginning of 2003. The company that Saxon founded was sold by his children to Reed Elsevier in mid-2004. It is currently owned by Boston-based company Houghton Mifflin Harcourt.

== Usage today ==
His books have gained popularity among groups of homeschoolers and some private schools, but are also used in a number of public schools who favor a "back to basics" approach to mathematics. The group Citizens for the Constructive Review of Public Policy specifically mentions Saxon math and textbooks in their original 1990 statement of principles. William F. Buckley also commented on this in a 1981 issue of National Review.

== Honors ==
Saxon's son, physician Dr. John H. Saxon III, initiated the John H. Saxon Service Academy Summer Research Program at the Oklahoma Medical Research Foundation in 2009 with a grant of $250,000. As a board member, Dr. Saxon wished to honor both his father's academy experience and military career, as well as serve the research facility. Students from the U.S. military academies are chosen to come to the foundation in the summer to work with senior scientists. The program allows the students an opportunity for knowledge acquisition and to prepare those who go on to serve as medical officers or in similar scientific pursuits.

== See also ==
- Jaime Escalante - educator whose methods helped urban students excel in math
- Mathematics education
