= Saxon math =

Teaching method for mathematics

Saxon math, developed by John Saxon (1923–1996), is a teaching method for incremental learning of mathematics created in the 1980s. It involves teaching a new mathematical concept every day and constantly reviewing old concepts. Early editions were deprecated for providing very few opportunities to practice the new material before plunging into a review of all previous material. Newer editions typically split the day's work evenly between practicing the new material and reviewing old material. It uses a steady review of all previous material, with a focus on students who struggle with retaining the math they previously learned. However, it has sometimes been criticized for its heavy emphasis on rote rather than conceptual learning.

The Saxon Math 1 to Algebra 1/2 (the equivalent of a Pre-Algebra book) curriculum is designed so that students complete assorted mental math problems, learn a new mathematical concept, practice problems relating to that lesson, and solve a variety of problems. Daily practice problems include relevant questions from the current day's lesson as well as cumulative problems. This daily cycle is interrupted for tests and additional topics. From Algebra 1/2 on, the higher-level books remove the mental math problems and incorporate more frequent testing.

Saxon Publishers has also published a phonics and spelling curriculum. This curriculum, authored by Lorna Simmons and first published in 2005, follows the same incremental principles as the Saxon Math curriculum.

The Saxon math program has a specific set of products to support homeschoolers, including solution keys and ready-made tests, which makes it popular among some homeschool families. It has also been adopted as an alternative to reform mathematics programs in public and private schools. Saxon teaches memorization of algorithms, unlike many reform texts.

== Relation to Common Core ==
In some reviews, such as those performed by the nonprofit curriculum rating site EdReports.org, Saxon Math is ranked poorly because it is not aligned with the Common Core State Standards Initiative. That initiative, which has been adopted by most U.S. states, is an important factor in determining which curricula are used in public schools in those states. However, Saxon Math continues to be popular among private schools and homeschoolers, many of whom favor its more traditional approach to teaching math.
