= Flag of Saint Paul, Minnesota =

City of Saint Paul
- Proportion: 4:5
- Adopted: November 22, 1932
- Design: A yellow, blue, yellow horizontal triband with a shield in the middle and a ribbon reading "SAINT PAUL" below that
- Designed by: Gladys Mittle

The flag of Saint Paul is the official municipal flag of Saint Paul, Minnesota. Adopted via a 1932 competition, the current flag is a yellow-blue-yellow horizontal triband. A red shield depicting various aspects of St. Paul's industry and history is in the foreground and a red ribbon reading "SAINT PAUL" in yellow font below the shield.

== Design and symbolism ==
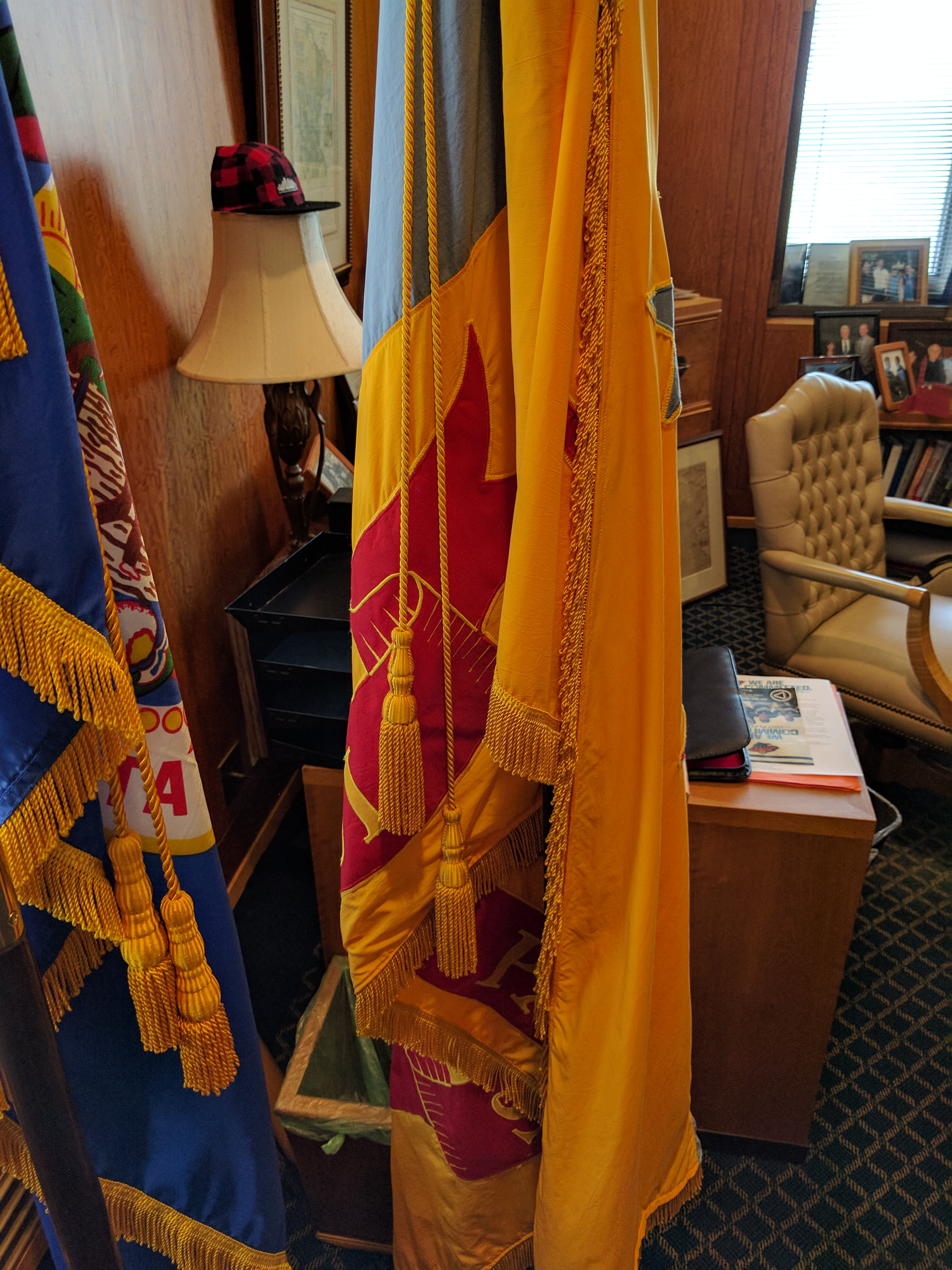
The flag alongside the Flag of Minnesota in the St. Paul City Hall mayor's office

The blue strip in the triband represents the Mississippi River, which runs through both the Twin Cities. The shield is separated into three parts, with a yellow line separating a yellow log cabin and a yellow dome, with the first representing Lucien Galtier's Saint Paul's Chapel in the city, built in 1841 and eventually becoming the city's namesake. The dome symbolizes the city's importance as the location of the Minnesota State Capitol. Connected to the line is a yellow triangle with the bottom vertex cut and replaced with a curved section. Within this triangle is a blue winged wheel, representing the city's role as a transportation hub. The red shield symbolizes the progress and spirit of St. Paul. Where the two engrails at the top of the shield meet, a blue star can be found, representing the star of the north, a popular Minnesota symbol and symbolic of St. Paul's allegiance to Minnesota.

== History ==
The St. Paul Association of Commerce sponsored a city-wide contest for a new city flag. The winner was designed by College of St. Catherine art student Gladys Mittle and was officially adopted on November 22, 1932. The first major display of the flag was on March 30, 1935, when thousands were flown for St. Paul Day. A 2004 North American Vexillological Association survey of United States city flags placed St. Paul's as number 44th, ranking below the Flag of Minneapolis. Mayor Randy Kelly reportedly expressed interest in orchestrating a new flag contest around the time of the survey; however, this idea did not take off. Prior to this, the flag was somewhat hard to find throughout the city, with one vexillologist unable to find any public displays. Since then, the flag has experienced a growth in popularity, with one Blogspot website selling between 200 and 300 flags in 2014. The flag has been spotted at large venues such as CHS Field, Minnesota United FC games and mini-golf course Can Can Wonderland.
