= Saint Bernard's High School (Saint Paul, Minnesota) =

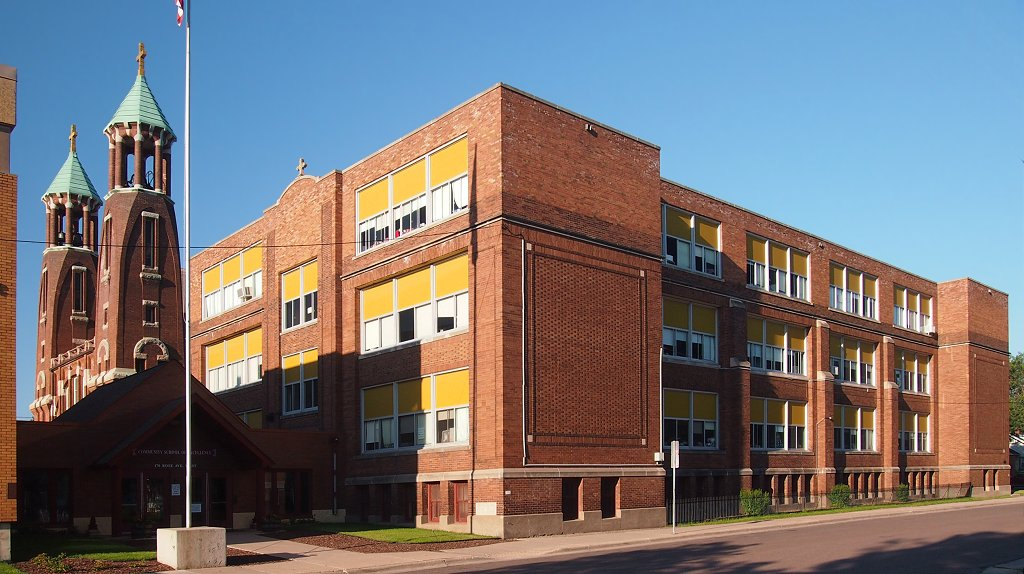
- The former Saint Bernard's High School with the Church of Saint Bernard in the background

Location
- 170 West Rose Avenue; Saint Paul, (Ramsey County), Minnesota 55117; United States
- Coordinates: 44°58′34″N 93°6′26″W

Information
- Type: Private, Coeducational
- Religious affiliation: Roman Catholic
- Established: 1957
- Closed: June 2010
- Grades: 9–12
- Colors: Royal Blue and Gold
- Slogan: In All Things, May God Be Glorified
- Fight song: Bulldog Fight Song
- Athletics conference: Tri-Metro Conference
- Mascot: Spike The Bulldog
- Team name: Bulldogs
- Newspaper: Bulldog Beat
- Yearbook: Memorare

Saint Bernard's High School was a private, Roman Catholic high school in Saint Paul, Minnesota, United States. The High School, along with an elementary school that served pre-kindergarten to eighth grade, also closed, were both part of the Church of Saint Bernard, which is adjacent to the former school building (now used to house the Community School of Excellence). The Parish and Grade School were founded in 1891, with the high school being opened in 1957.

== Location ==
Saint Bernard's School was located in the North End neighborhood of Saint Paul, Minnesota, near the intersection of Rice Street and Maryland Avenue, north of the state capitol. Being a non-public school, Saint Bernard's was part of the Archdiocese of Saint Paul and Minneapolis.

== History ==
Saint Bernard's Parish and Saint Bernard's grade school were both founded in 1891. At that time, the school was run by three Benedictine sisters, and students would sit on the kneelers in the church and use the pews as desks. At its peak, Saint Bernard's grade school was the largest catholic grade school west of Chicago. The original school building was built shortly after the school's founding, and in 1905 the current church building was built. In 1957, demand for a secondary school was answered with the addition of a high school. In 1959 the former high school building, adjacent to the original school building (both of which are still standing), used by the grade school until 2009, as well as the church, was constructed.
Unfortunately, due to the economic recession and a decline in the number of students, the grade school was closed after the 2008-2009 school year.

Throughout the halls of the high school, class pictures from most graduating classes from the high school's founding to the current day hang above lockers and doorways. There are also several old pictures hanging in the conference room, as well as the school entrance.

On Thursday, February 18, 2010, it was announced that Saint Bernard's High School would close its doors at the end of that school year. Despite a strong campaign to raise enough money, which did succeed in raising pledges, the Pastor determined it would be better for the parish to allow a charter school to move into the space.

After its closing, the school buildings were used by Community School of Excellence, which subsequently moved. As of September 2025 at least some of the old school buildings are used by Prodeo Academy.

== Slogans ==
The school/parish have a few slogans. They are:

- That in all things God may be glorified
- Founded in Faith, Rooted in Tradition, Growing in Excellence
- Saints, Scholars, Ladies and Gentleman

== Notes and references ==
Referenced in the television show "Gilmore Girls," in a long sleeved t-shirt worn by Lorelai Gilmore (The Bracebridge Dinner Season 2 Episode 10)
