= North End, Saint Paul =

Coordinates: 44°57′46″N 93°7′34″W

North End
- Neighborhood
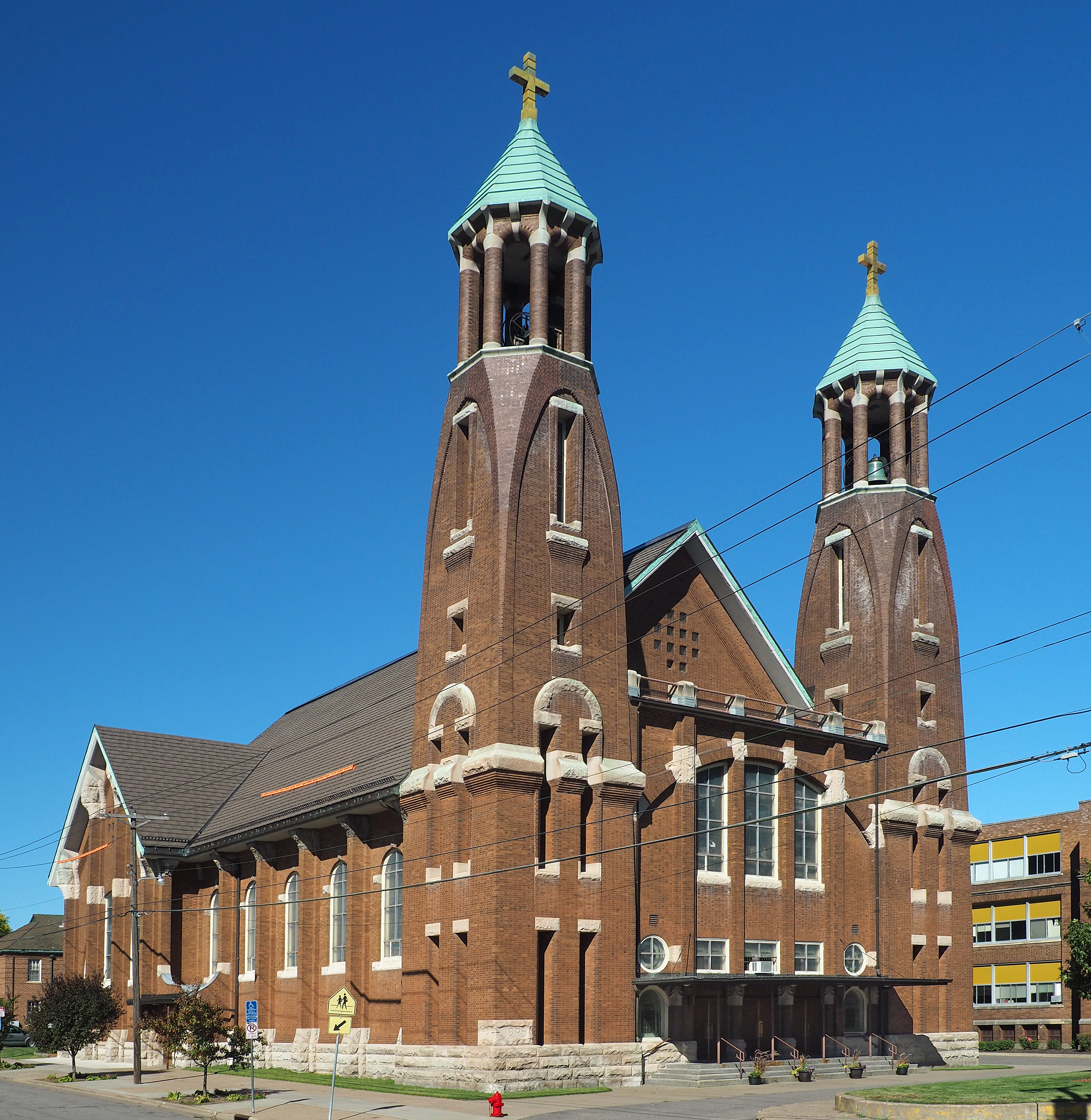
- St. Bernard's Catholic Church near the center of the neighborhood.
- Nickname: Rice Street
- Country: United States
- State: Minnesota
- County: Ramsey
- City: Saint Paul

Area
  - Total: 4.217 sq mi (10.92 km^{2})

Population (2017)
  - Total: 23,671
  - Density: 5,613/sq mi (2,167/km^{2})
- Time zone: UTC-6 (CST)
  - Summer (DST): UTC-5 (CDT)
- ZIP code: 55117
- Area code: 651
- Website: http://www.nenostpaul.org/

The North End is a neighborhood in Saint Paul in the U.S. state of Minnesota. The neighborhood was built around Rice Street and is often referred to by that name. It is bounded by Larpenteur Avenue on the north, the Burlington Northern Santa Fe Railroad tracks to the south, Dale Street to the west, and Interstate 35E to the east.

== History ==
European settlement of the neighborhood began in the 1840s. In 1849, Edmund Rice purchased a large tract of land in the vicinity of modern Cayuga Street and Interstate 35E for an estate he called Trout Brook. Beginning in 1857, Edmund Rice helped to establish and build the St. Paul and Pacific Railroad through his property, which forms the southern border of the North End. Other railroads began to encircle the neighborhood in the 1880s, including the Northern Pacific Railroad tracks running north of Maryland Avenue and the Soo Line, today the path of the Trout Brook Regional Trail.

These railroads drove settlement in the southern part of the neighborhood. Large employers located along the railroad corridor, including the Jackson Street Roundhouse and the former Saint Paul Foundry, now the Empire Builder Business Park. Rice Street, which had its origins in rough trails used by the fur trade, gradually became a major commercial and transportation corridor, with horsecar and later electric streetcar service as far north as Ivy Avenue. These brought development further north into the neighborhood, although areas north of Maryland Avenue remained substantially undeveloped until the mid-to-late 20th century. The neighborhood became a traditional entry point for successive waves of immigrants to Saint Paul, including Romanians, Bohemians, Hungarians, Irish, and especially southern Germans. The area south of Maryland Avenue around the St. Bernard's Church became known as "Little Bavaria" for its many German residents and businesses.

Like many urban neighborhoods, the North End experienced decline in the second half of the twentieth century due to White Flight and concentrated poverty. New waves of immigrants replaced the descendants of previous generations, including substantial numbers of Hmong, Somali, and Karen refugees. Today the North End is one of Saint Paul's most diverse neighborhoods. Substantial efforts by local government aimed at revitalizing the area are ongoing.
