= Patriotic Kenny =

American veteran and influencer (1942–2026)

- Born: Kenneth Jary; January 29, 1942; St. Paul, Minnesota, US
- Died: May 16, 2026 (aged 84); Minnesota, US
- Occupation: Navy veteran
- Spouse: Carol Marsh (m. 1965; div. 1988)
- Children: 3

Instagram information
- Page: patriotickenny
- Followers: 978,000

TikTok information
- Page: @patriotickennyfdn
- Years active: 2021-2026
- Followers: 3.3 million

Kenneth Jary (January 29, 1942 – May 16, 2026), better known as Patriotic Kenny, was a United States Navy veteran and social media personality. Jary became a viral sensation from videos that he made with his neighbor, Amanda Kline, who his well-known catchphrase, "Oh my goodness, Amanda!" is referring to.

== Early life, family and education ==
Kenneth Jary was raised in a military family in St. Paul, Minnesota near West Seventh Street. Both his father (Army) and Uncle Jim (Navy) served during World War II. Jary joined the Navy Reserve in 1959 and graduated from Monroe High School, a year later. (The school's last graduating class was in 1979.)

== Military service and career ==
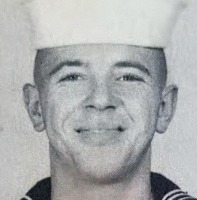
Jary during his Navy days

Jary joined the Navy Reserve in 1959 during high school. He subsequently served in the Navy during the Cuban Missile Crisis on the USS Okinawa. Jary continued active duty and served as a helicopter refueler until 1963. Following his service, he worked for 32 years at the Ford Motor Company's Twin Cities Assembly Plant in St. Paul.

== Amanda Kline and TikTok ==
Amanda Kline, a teacher at Metro Deaf School in St. Paul, met Jary through a mutual friend in 2021 outside a coffee shop in Mahtomedi, Minnesota. They became friends. Kline set up a TikTok account that featured Jary as "Patriotic Kenny". The premiere video showed Jary learning ASL to sign "Thank you" and "Hello" to his deaf friend Jerry.

A month later, Kline uploaded a video sharing the news that Jary's mobility scooter had broken and he did not have the money to fix it. A GoFundMe campaign raised $5,000 within the first day. Jary's video response on September 19, 2021, received over 12.5 million views. Within two days, the campaign raised over $100,000; prompting Kline and Jary to gift 10 free scooters to other veterans in need. By 2022, the campaign had gifted 50 scooters to disabled veterans. In a 2022 interview, Kline stated that she "tries to post a new video by 8 each night." She is founder and content creator of @patriotickenny and co-founder of Did You Know That. "I kept getting messages from people, saying, 'I couldn’t go to bed last night because there wasn't a video'," Kline said. As of 2026, Patriotic Kenny has over 3 million followers on TikTok and over 900,000 on Instagram. In 2023, Kline authored the children's book Kenny's Bright Red Scooter with illustrations by Julie Bourne.

== Illness and foundation ==
In a March 2026 video, Jary announced himself that he was suffering from stage 4 lung cancer. Another GoFundMe campaign was launched by Kline to aid in raising funds for Jary toward medical treatment and "funeral costs", according to Jary. Due to an overwhelming response from online fans and followers, funds exceeded expectations, prompting Jary, with the assistance of Kline, to "pay it forward" by contributing to the Patriotic Kenny Foundation. The non-profit foundation provides mobility scooters to veterans: “free of red tape” and has given 50 to 200 scooters to veterans at no charge. According to Kline, GoFundMe donations totaled $3,000 in the "first five minutes"; and in 20 hours, "people gave $147,000." Coverage of the campaigns and foundation was featured on The Today Show, The Kelly Clarkson Show, On the Road with Steve Hartman, NBC Nightly News, ABC World News Tonight and Good Morning America.

== Personal life and death ==
Jary married Carol Marsh in 1965. They had three children and divorced in 1988, but remained close until Marsh's death in 2018. Jary's life-partner, Barbara Sanz, died in 2017.

Jary died at his home on May 16, 2026, at the age of 84 from lung cancer and congestive heart failure.
