= Greater East Side, Saint Paul =

The Greater East Side is a neighborhood and city district in Saint Paul, Minnesota, in the United States. The community lies in the northeastern corner of the city and is bounded by Larpenteur Avenue on the north, Minnehaha Avenue on the south, McKnight Road on the east, and Johnson Parkway and English Street on the west. It is part of a group of neighborhoods collectively known as the East Side.

The area is largely residential with an "urban suburban" mix, according to the neighborhood review site, Niche. A pair of adjacent parks in the neighborhood, Prosperity Park and Prosperity Heights Park, contain a playground, athletic fields, walking trails, and a 10-acre natural area. The southeast part of the neighborhood is home to a large 3M warehouse for receiving and storing raw materials.

== History ==
The East Side of Saint Paul was settled by waves of European immigrants beginning in the 1850s and drawn by manufacturing jobs in the area. The first wave was mostly from Ireland, Germany, and Scandinavia. By the early 1900s, many immigrants were coming from southern and eastern Europe. The most recent immigrants have been Hmong refugees from Vietnam, beginning in the 1970s.

The Greater East Side has always been a working-class neighborhood, with nearby Hamm’s and Whirlpool being major employers during the middle of the 20th Century.

== Demographics ==
According to the 2020 census, the population of the neighborhood was 31,104, with 46.8% being male and 53.2% being female. In terms of ethnic background, 33.9% of the population identifies as Asian or Pacific Islander, 33.1% of the population identifies as White, 14.7% identifies as Black or African American, and 11.6% identifies as Hispanic or Latino. In terms of language, 57.4% speak English only, 42.6% speak a language other than English, and 23.3% speak English less than "very well."

== Education ==
Public and charter schools in the Greater East Side neighborhood include Academia Cesar Chavez, Achieve Language Academy, Cornerstone Montessori, Frost Lake Elementary School, Hazel Park Preparatory, The Heights Community School, L'Etoile du Nord French Immersion Lower Campus, Nokomis Montessori Magnet School, and Txuj Ci Hmong Language and Culture Upper Campus.

The Hayden Heights Library, a branch of the Saint Paul Public Library, is located in the neighborhood on White Bear Avenue.
