= Church of St. Bernard (Saint Paul, Minnesota) =

Historic church in Minnesota, United States

- Church of St. Bernard--Catholic
- U.S. National Register of Historic Places
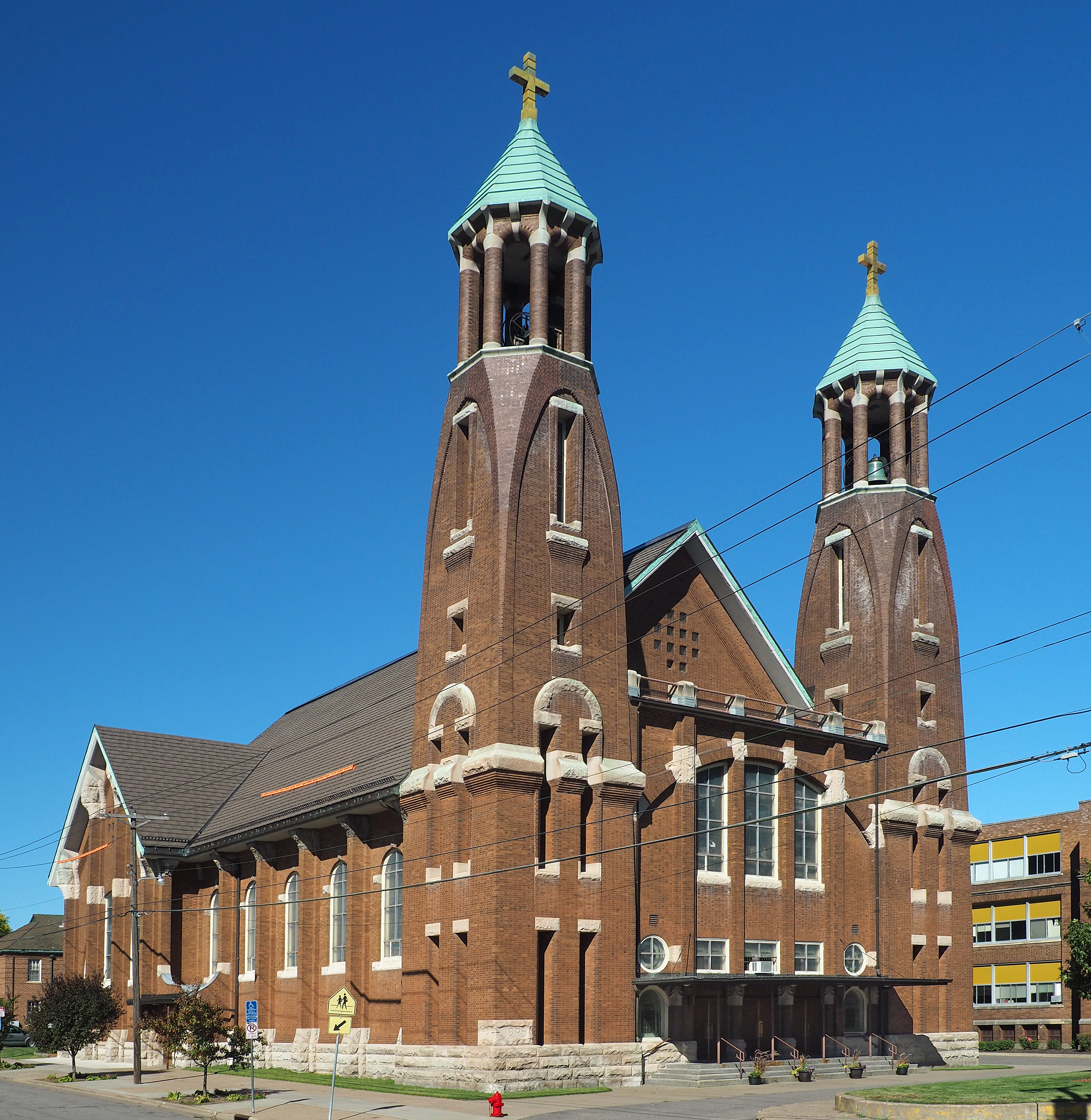
- The Church of St. Bernard from the southeast

- Location within Minnesota Location within the United States
- Location: 197 Geranium Avenue West, Saint Paul, Minnesota
- Coordinates: 44°58′34″N 93°6′27″W
- Built: 1905
- Architect: John Jager; George Grant
- NRHP reference No.: 83000927
- Added to NRHP: February 24, 1983

The Church of Saint Bernard is a Roman Catholic parish in the North End neighborhood of Saint Paul, Minnesota. The brick church was designed by John Jager and built 1905–1914 in the Prairie School and Art Nouveau styles. It is listed on the National Register of Historic Places.

The parish formerly included a private school, Saint Bernard's High School, which closed in 2010 due to declining enrollment.
