= CHS Field =

Baseball park in Saint Paul, Minnesota, US

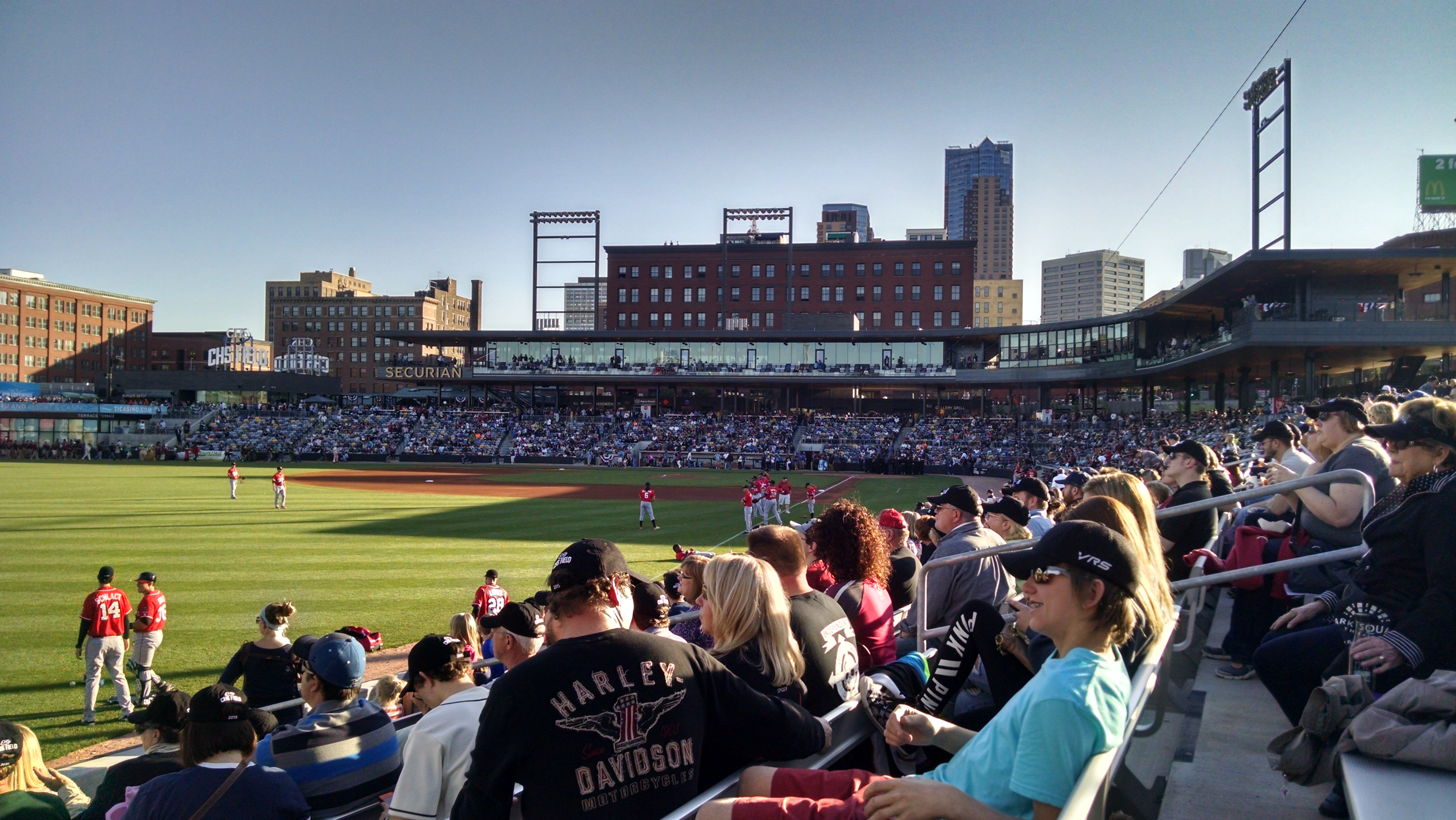

- Location within Minnesota Location within the United States
- Interactive map of CHS Field
- Address: 360 Broadway Street; Lowertown Historic District; Saint Paul, Minnesota
- Coordinates: 44°57′03.1″N 93°05′03.1″W
- Owner: City of Saint Paul
- Operator: St. Paul Saints
- Capacity: 7,210
- Surface: Grass
- Field size: Left field: 330 feet (100 m); Center field: 405 feet (123 m); Right field: 320 feet (98 m)
- Public transit: Green Line at Union Depot

Construction
- Groundbreaking: May 10, 2014; 12 years ago
- Opened: May 21, 2015; 11 years ago
- Cost: US$64.7 million ($87.9 million in 2025 dollars)
- Architects: Ryan A+E, Inc., AECOM & Snow Kreilich Architects
- Main contractor: Ryan Companies

Tenants
- St. Paul Saints (AA/IL) 2015–present Hamline University (MIAC) 2015–present

CHS Field is a baseball park in downtown Saint Paul, Minnesota. It is home to the St. Paul Saints of the International League of Minor League Baseball, as well as home to Hamline University's baseball team. With the Saints' affiliation to the Minnesota Twins, beginning in 2021, CHS Field is the second smallest Triple-A ballpark in the Minors, and the closest (at a distance of 12.9 miles along surface streets and Interstate 94) to its tenant's parent MLB club.

== History ==
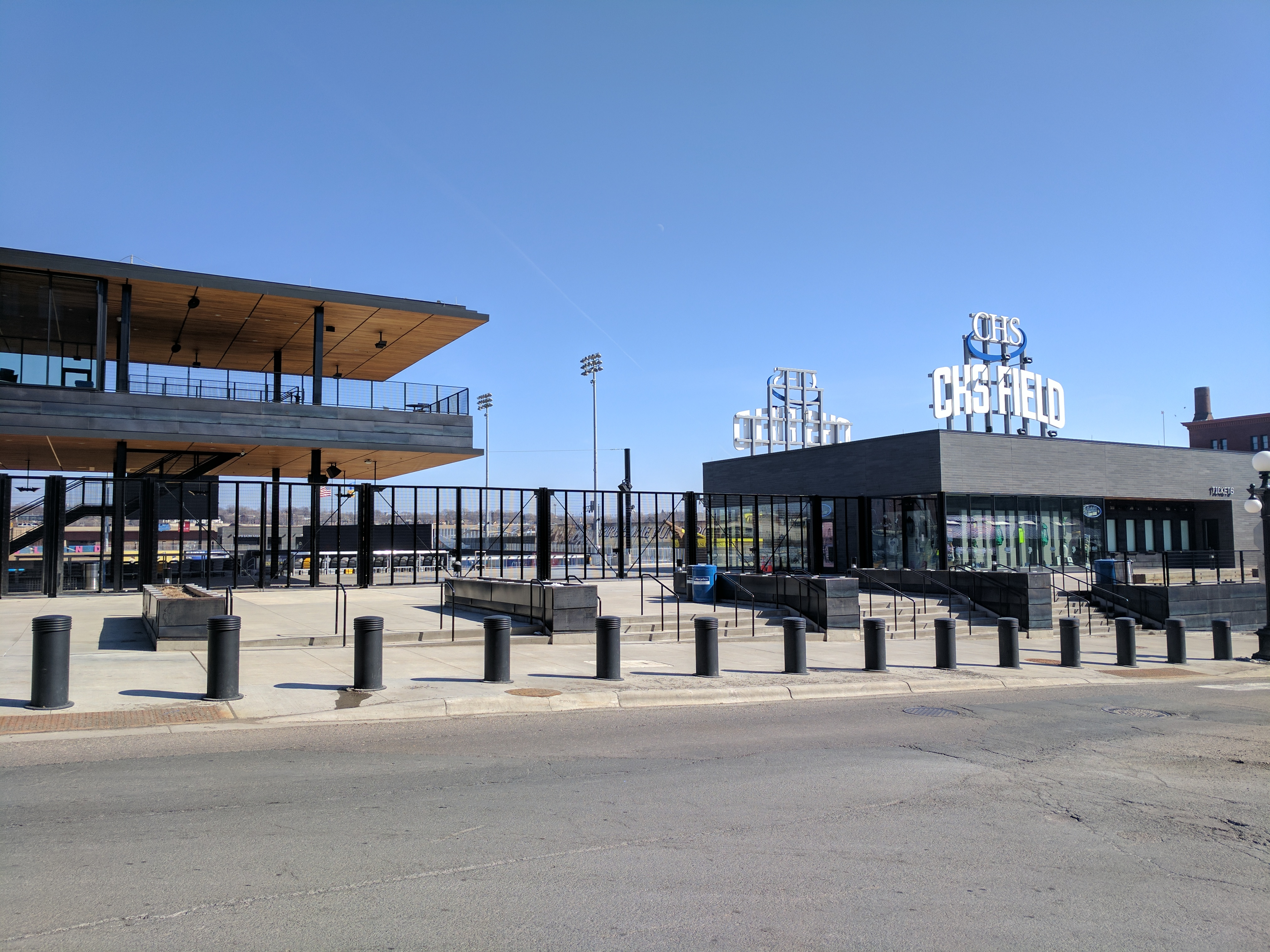
Exterior of CHS Field

Located in the historic Lowertown District of Saint Paul, the park is built upon the former site of a long-vacant industrial-use facility. In September 2012, the stadium was approved for $25 million in funding from the Minnesota Legislature. The remainder of the funding for the US$64 million project was shared between the city and the Saints.

The construction of this new ballpark was prompted in part by the deteriorating state of the Saints' original ballpark, Midway Stadium, which was built in 1982. Midway Stadium was located in an industrial area of Saint Paul, near the Minnesota State Fairgrounds. A groundbreaking event was held by the Saints on May 10, 2014, with the first concrete being poured on the site.

On September 8, 2014, it was announced that Fortune 100 cooperative CHS Inc., based in nearby Inver Grove Heights, had acquired the naming rights to the ballpark. The Saints played their first game at the park on May 18, 2015, against the Sioux City Explorers in an exhibition match. The first regular season game was against the Fargo-Moorhead RedHawks on May 21, 2015. On August 2, 2016, CHS Field hosted the American Association All-Star Game. The Saints again hosted the event on July 23, 2019.

In July 2017, the field hosted the Minnesota American Legion Baseball State Tournament, which was won by Tri-City Red, with Ham Lake also advancing to the Central Plains Regional Tournament.

The Saints have shattered attendance records since the park's opening in 2015, shattering the American Association mark in the park's opening season by drawing 404,528 fans, while also setting an independent professional baseball record by drawing 8,091 fans per night. The following season they bettered both marks, drawing 413,482 on an average of 8,438 fans over 49 dates. The Saints set a franchise record on August 13, 2019, by drawing 10,631 fans to a 10-2 victory over Winnipeg.

== Ballpark features ==
Beyond left field is a grassy picnic area known as "The Lawn" which can seat 1,000 people. Designed for groups, the picnic area offers a buffet-style selection of food.

CHS Field also boasts several environmentally-friendly features. An estimated 12 percent of the stadium's electricity is generated by 300 solar panels. A 27,000-gallon rain water collector supplies the park's sprinklers and toilets. Biking to the park is encouraged, with 24 bike racks placed adjacent to the park on Broadway Street.

Preceded by Midway Stadium	Home of the St. Paul Saints; 2015	Succeeded by Present
