= Government and politics in Saint Paul, Minnesota =

Saint Paul, Minnesota is the capital of Minnesota. The city is also the county seat of Ramsey County. Saint Paul has a strong mayor-council government. Seven city council members elected in wards and one mayor elected at large serve the city.

== City government and politics ==
Saint Paul is governed with a variation of the strong mayor-council form of government. The mayor is the chief executive and chief administrative officer for the city and the seven member city council is the legislative body. The mayor is elected from the entire city, while members of the city council are elected from seven different geographic wards, which have approximately equal populations. Both the mayor and the city council serve four-year terms.

The mayor's duties include preparing an annual budget, appointing heads to executive departments of the city and either signing or vetoing legislative ordinance passed by the city council. The city council is responsible for the city budget, which is supposed to be based on the mayor's proposed budget. All appointments made by the mayor must be approved by the city council. The city council may override the mayor's veto. In addition, the city council creates all of the city's ordinance. The city council may create legislative ordinance with four of seven votes. Legislative ordinance must then be presented to the mayor who may then veto or approve the legislation. With an additional vote, for a total of five votes, the council may override the mayor's veto.

In addition to the mayor-council system, Saint Paul is governed by a unique neighborhood system. Since 1975, the city is split up into 17 City Districts, which are then governed by a District Council. The District Councils receive funding from the city but are otherwise independently run. Most councils have significant power on land use issues.

== Mayor ==
The city has had three mayors who were natives of Ireland, William Dawson, Christopher D. O'Brien, and Frank Doran. Other Irish-American mayors of Saint Paul include: William Mahoney, William H. Fallon, John J. McDonough, Edward K. Delaney, John C. Daubney, Joseph E. Dillon, Thomas R. Byrne, Randy Kelly and Chris Coleman. Saint Paul has long been a Democratic stronghold. Aside from Norm Coleman who became a Republican in his second term, Saint Paul has not elected a Republican mayor since 1952. The city's current mayor is Kaohly Her, a member of the Democratic-Farmer-Labor Party (DFL).

== City Council ==
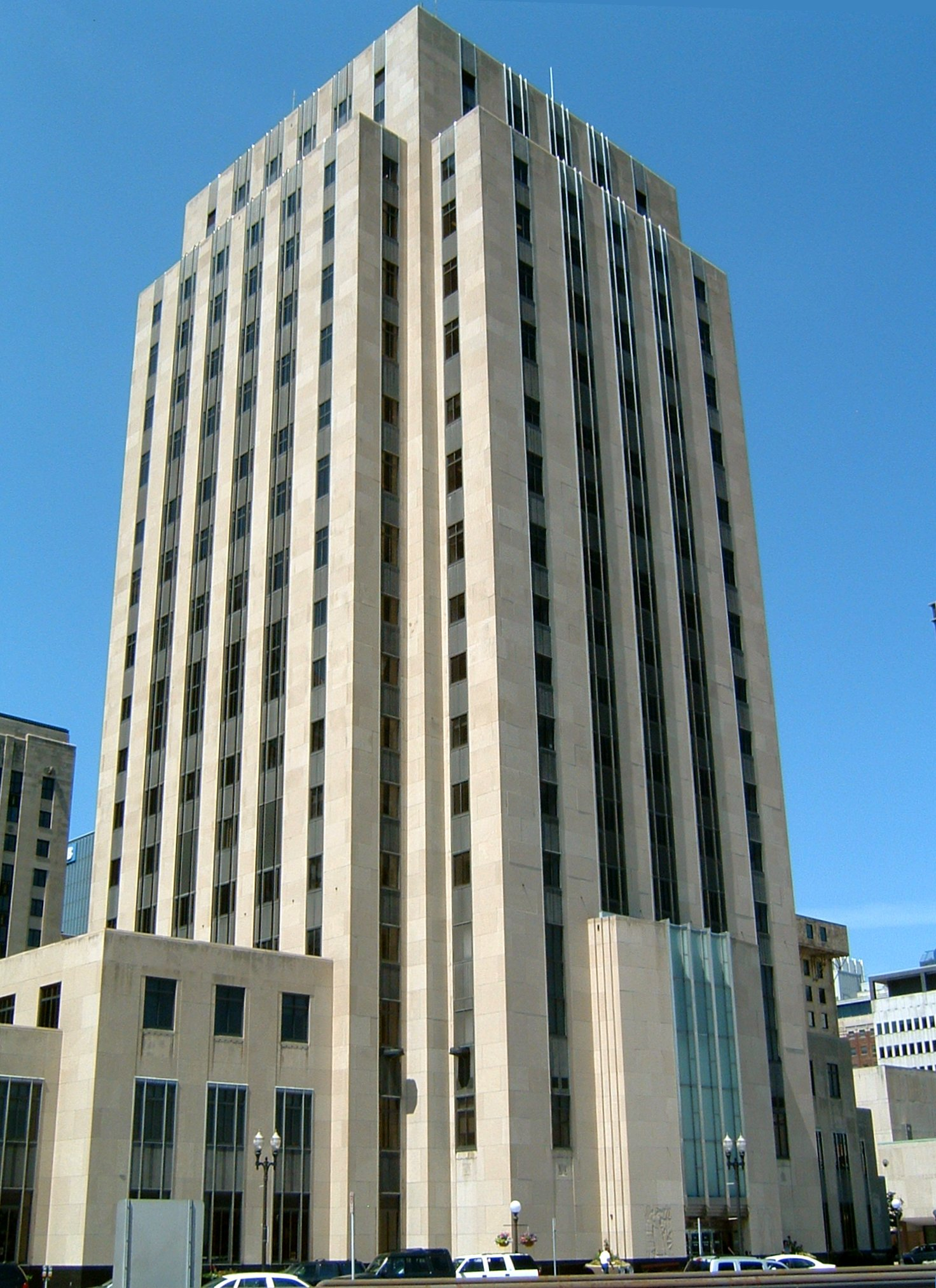
Saint Paul City Hall

As of the 2023 general election the Saint Paul City Council included:

Ward	Name	Party
1st	Anika Bowie	DFL
2nd	Rebecca Noecker	DFL
3rd	Saura Jost	DFL
4th	Mitra Jalali	DFL
5th	HwaJeong Kim	DFL
6th	Nelsie Yang	DFL
7th	Cheniqua Johnson	DFL

== State ==
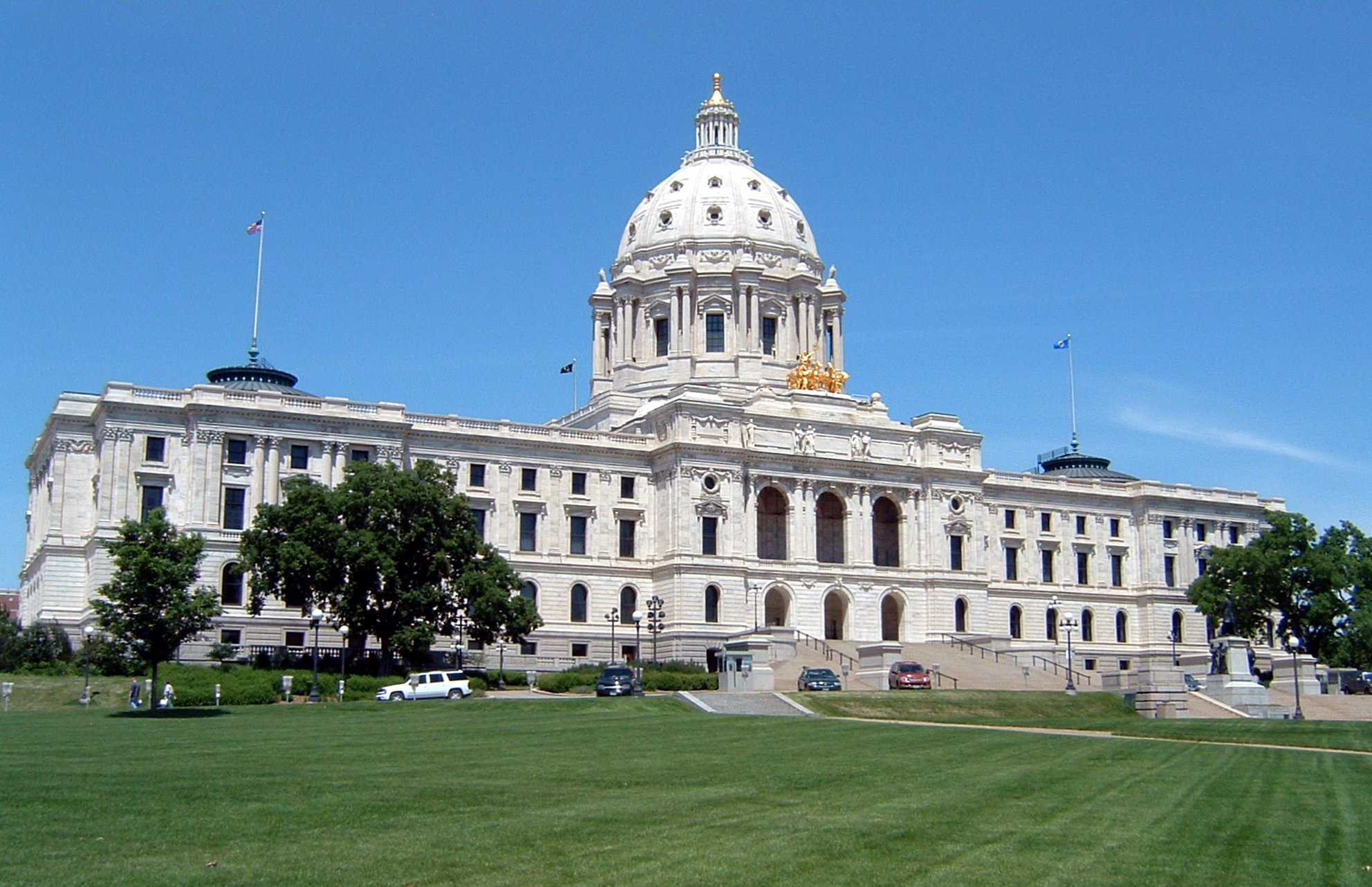
Minnesota State Capitol building in Saint Paul, designed by Cass Gilbert

Saint Paul is the capital of the state of Minnesota. The city hosts the capitol building, designed by Saint Paul resident Cass Gilbert. The Minnesota Supreme Court meets in the state capitol as well as the Minnesota Judicial Center. The Minnesota house and senate office buildings are also in the city. The Minnesota Governor's Residence, which is used for some state functions, is on Summit Avenue.

The Minnesota Democratic-Farmer-Labor Party, the state affiliate of the Democratic Party, is headquartered in Saint Paul.

Saint Paul is also the county seat for Ramsey County.

The city is represented by four Minnesota Senate districts; 64, 65, 66 and 67. Minnesota House of Representatives districts 64A, 64B, 65A, 65B, 66A, 66B, 67A and 67B are all located in the city.

Minnesota House and Senate districts
Senate				House			
	Name	First elected	Party		Name	First elected	Party
64	Dick Cohen	1986	DFL	64A	Erin Murphy	2006	DFL
64	Dick Cohen	1986	DFL	64B	Dave Pinto	2014	DFL
65	Sandy Pappas	1990	DFL	65A	Rena Moran	2010	DFL
65	Sandy Pappas	1990	DFL	65B	Carlos Mariani	1990	DFL
66	John Marty*	1992	DFL	66A	John Lesch	2002	DFL
66	John Marty*	1992	DFL	66B	Alice Hausman*	1989	DFL
67	Foung Hawj	2012	DFL	67A	Tim Mahoney	1998	DFL
67	Foung Hawj	2012	DFL	67B	Sheldon Johnson	2000	DFL

*District also includes Falcon Heights, Lauderdale and Roseville .

== Federal ==
United States presidential election results for Saint Paul, Minnesota
Year	Republican		Democratic		Third party(ies)	
Year	No.	%	No.	%	No.	%
2000	32,520	26.65%	77,158	63.22%	12,369	10.13%
2004	35,671	25.93%	99,851	72.59%	2,026	1.47%
2008	31,667	22.38%	106,926	75.58%	2,883	2.04%
2012	30,035	21.01%	108,983	76.23%	3,946	2.76%
2016	23,530	16.86%	104,226	74.68%	11,800	8.46%
2020	27,764	18.27%	120,687	79.43%	3,490	2.30%

Saint Paul is located in Minnesota's 4th congressional district, a solidly Democratic district with a CPVI of D + 13. The district is represented by Betty McCollum, a progressive Democrat, scoring 92% progressive by a progressive group and 4% conservative by a conservative group on a range of issues. Former U.S. Senator, Norm Coleman, was formerly mayor of Saint Paul. Saint Paul's Xcel Energy Center was the host of the 2008 Republican National Convention.
