= Daubney =

Daubney is a surname. Notable people with the surname include:

- Brian Blyth Daubney (1929–2022), composer and educator
- David Daubney (born 1947), former MP, head of the Ottawa Public Library Foundation Board of Directors
- John E. Daubney (1919–2003), Irish Catholic mayor of St. Paul, Minnesota, 1952–1954
- Martin Daubney (born 1970), the longest serving editor of Loaded magazine

== See also ==
- Hinton Daubney, small hamlet in Hampshire, England, located between Catherington and Hambledon
- Daubeny (disambiguation)
