= 1920 Minnesota gubernatorial election =

- November 2, 1920
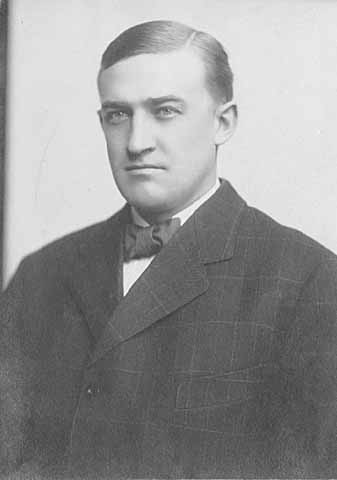

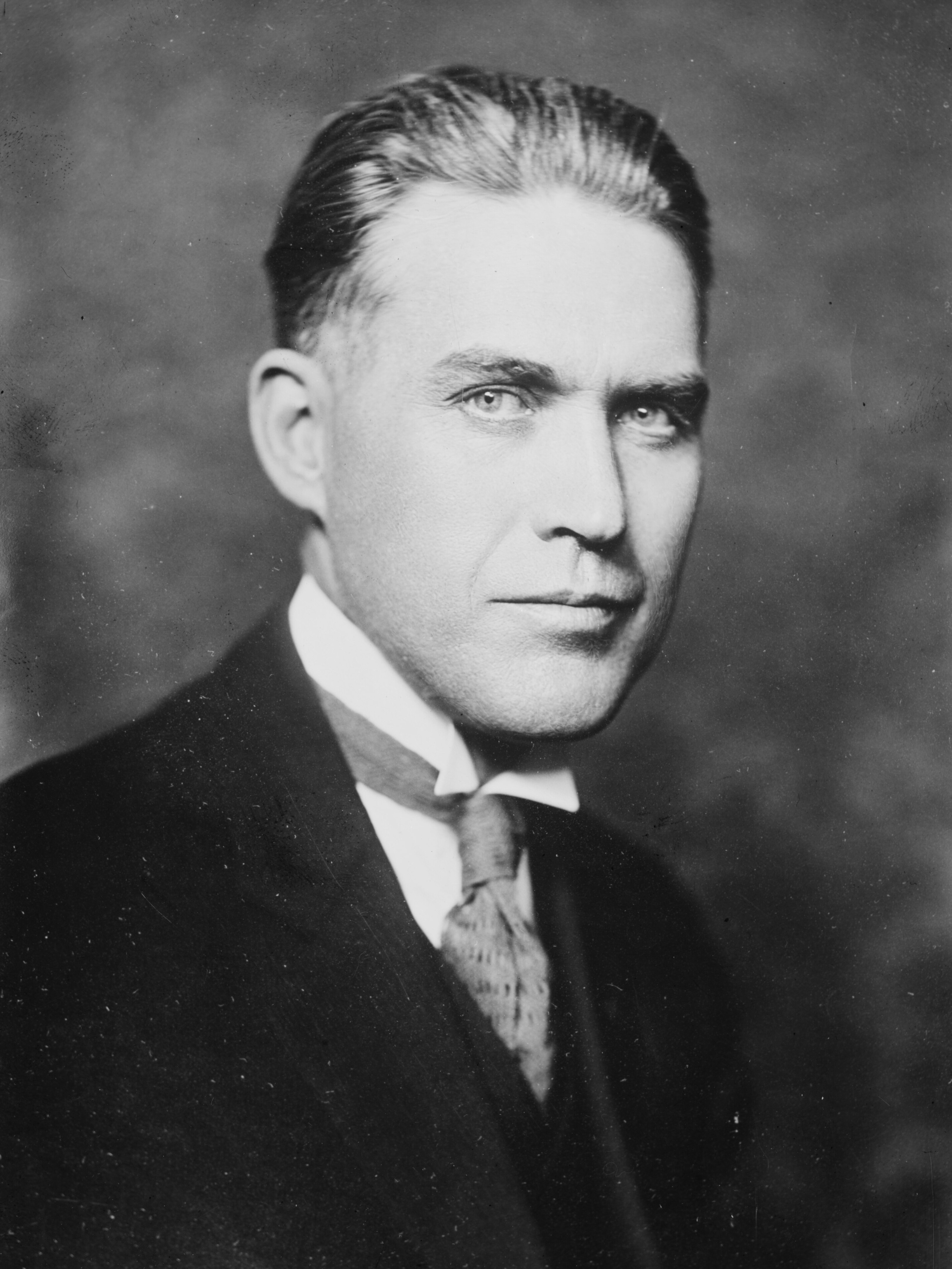

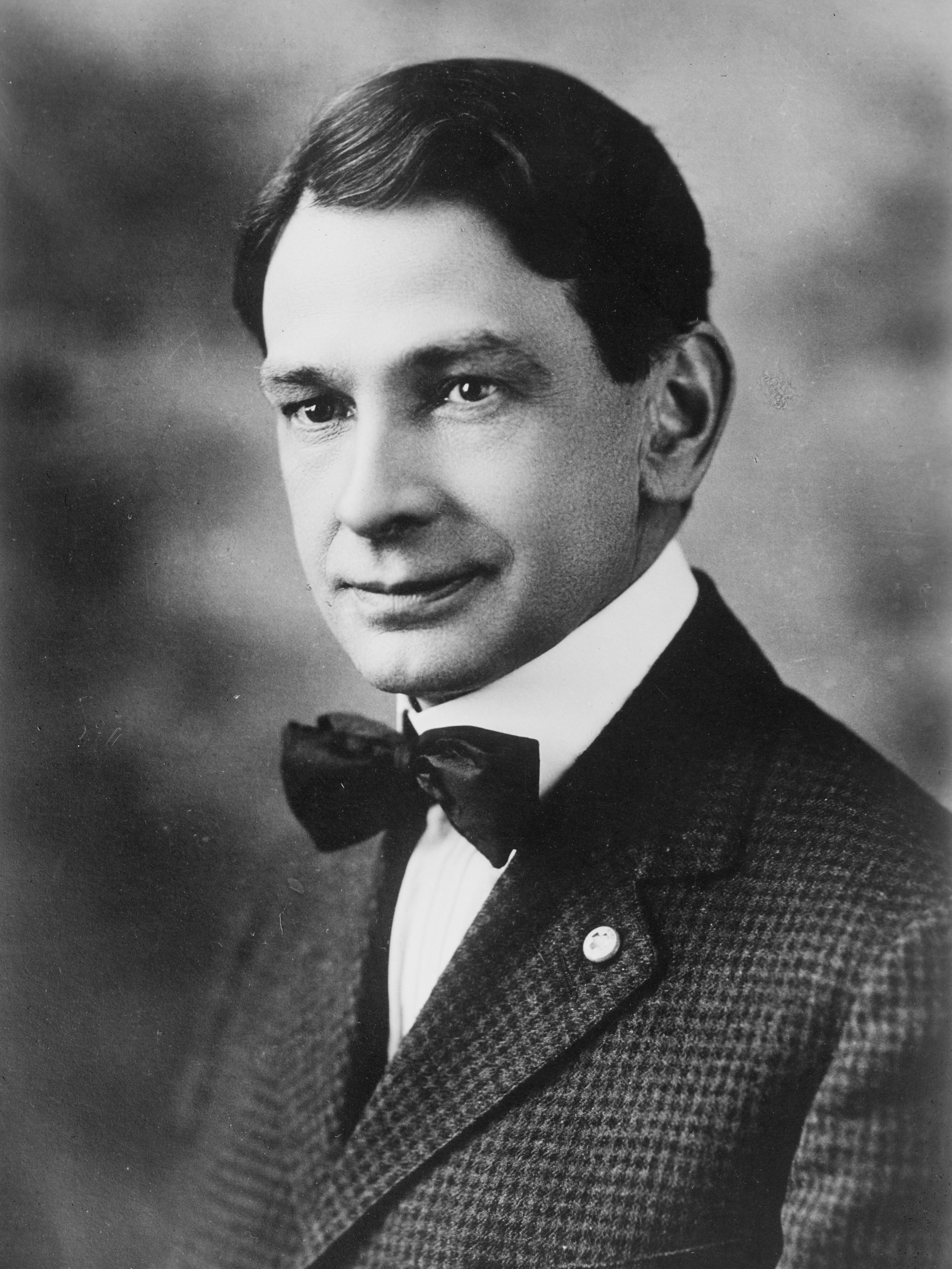
Nominee	J. A. O. Preus	Henrik Shipstead	Laurence C. Hodgson
Party	Republican	Independent	Democratic
Popular vote	415,805	281,402	81,293
Percentage	53.06%	35.91%	10.37%
- County results Preus: 30–40% 40–50% 50–60% 60–70% 70–80% Shipstead: 40–50% 50–60% 60–70% Tie: Preus/Shipstead 30–40%
Governor before election
J. A. A. Burnquist
Republican
Elected Governor
J. A. O. Preus
Republican

The 1920 Minnesota gubernatorial election took place on November 2, 1920. Republican Party of Minnesota candidate J. A. O. Preus defeated Independent challengers Henrik Shipstead and the mayor of St. Paul, Laurence C. Hodgson. Shipstead narrowly lost to Preus in the Republican primary, and challenged him in the general election, beating the Democratic nominee but coming far short of winning.

Shipstead soon joined the Farmer–Labor Party, which did not officially participate in this election, and became the first party member to win statewide under that banner as senator in 1922. The Farmer–Laborites also became the main opposition party, replacing the Democrats, displacing them until the two parties' political union into the DFL in the 1944.

== Republican primary ==
The Republican primary election was held on June 21, 1920.

Shipstead was endorsed by the Nonpartisan League and Arthur C. Townley. Preus's campaign in the primary was focused on emphasizing that firstly, Preus and Shipstead were the only ones with a chance in the general election, and secondly that Shipstead was a socialist in disguise as a Republican, and that he was the only candidate to stop the rise of what he called "Townleyism". Preus's campaign slogan became "Down Socialism". In a speech in Mankato, he described the primary as "Americanism versus Socialism."

=== Candidates ===
==== Nominated ====
- J. A. O. Preus, state auditor, former state commissioner of insurance

==== Eliminated in primary ====
- Franklin F. Ellsworth, U.S. representative, former county attorney of Watonwan County
- Thomas Frankson, lieutenant governor, former state representative
- Samuel G. Iverson, former state auditor, former state representative
- Thomas Keefe, businessman, attorney
- Henrik Shipstead, former state representative, former mayor of Glenwood

==== Withdrawn ====
- Michael J. Dowling, former speaker of the Minnesota House, former mayor of Olivia (endorsed Preus)
- Dr. L. A. Fritsche, mayor of New Ulm
- Fred E. Hadley, editor of the Winnebago Enterprise, member of the Republican State Committee (endorsed Preus)
- Dr. Frank Nelson, president of Minnesota College, former Kansas superintendent (endorsed Preus)
- W. F. Schilling, farmer
- Julius A. Schmahl, secretary of state

==== Declined ====
- Ernest Lundeen, former U.S. representative, former state representative

=== Results ===
Results by county: Preus: 40–50%; 50–60%; 60–70%; Shipstead: 30–40%; 40–50%; 50–60%; 60–70%; 70–80%

Republican Party of Minnesota primary results
Party	Candidate	Votes	%
Republican	J. A. O. Preus	133,832	43.55%
Republican	Henrik Shipstead	125,861	40.96%
Republican	Thomas Frankson	27,421	8.92%
Republican	Franklin F. Ellsworth	7,754	2.52%
Republican	Samuel G. Iverson	7,383	2.40%
Republican	Thomas Keefe	5,060	1.65%
Total votes		195,202	100%

== Democratic primary ==
The Democratic primary election was held on June 21, 1920.

=== Candidates ===
==== Nominated ====
- Laurence C. Hodgson, mayor of St. Paul

==== Eliminated in primary ====
- Charles M. Andrist, businessman, former chief of staff to Governor Hammond, former University of Minnesota professor, Democratic nominee for lieutenant governor in 1914
- Robert W. Hargadine, former state fire marshal, former campaign manager for Governor John A. Johnson
- Edward Indrehus, former state representative, Democratic nominee for secretary of state in 1918
- Alfred Jaques, U.S. attorney for the District of Minnesota
- Oliver J. Quane, editor of the St. Peter Herald, Army lieutenant colonel in World War I, veteran of the Spanish-American War
- Julius Thorson, Democratic nominee for lieutenant governor in 1918, former state representative

==== Declined ====
- C. W. Stanton, district judge

=== Results ===
Results by county: Hodgson: 10–20%; 20–30%; 30–40%; 40–50%; 50–60%; 60–70%; 70–80%; 90–100%; Hargadine: 30–40%; Quane: 30–40%; 40–50%; 50–60%; 60–70%; Thorson: 20–30%; 30–40%; 40–50%; 80–90%; Jaques: 30–40%; Andrist: 30–40%; 50–60%; Indrehus: 20–30%; 30–40%; 40–50%; 70–80%; Tie: 20–30%

Minnesota Democratic gubernatorial primary results
Party	Candidate	Votes	%
Democratic	Laurence C. Hodgson	11,114	40.17%
Democratic	Robert W. Hargadine	3,679	13.30%
Democratic	Oliver J. Quane	3,443	12.44%
Democratic	Julius Thorson	3,232	11.68%
Democratic	Alfred Jaques	2,179	7.88%
Democratic	Charles M. Andrist	2,038	7.37%
Democratic	Edward Indrehus	1,982	7.16%
Total votes		38,480	100%

== Campaign ==
Following his defeat in the Republican primary, Shipstead began his campaign running as an independent on September 20, 1920.

Preus was successful among independents, who were the deciding demographic in the election. This was the first time a gubernatorial in Minnesota was decided by independents. On October 21, 1920, William J. Mayo, a Democrat, endorsed Preus.

== Results ==
1920 gubernatorial election, Minnesota
Party	Candidate	Votes	%	±%
Republican	J. A. O. Preus	415,805	53.06%	+10.33%
Independent	Henrik Shipstead	281,402	35.91%	n/a
Democratic	Laurence C. Hodgson	81,293	10.37%	−9.33%
Socialist	Peter J. Sampson	5,124	0.65%	−1.35%
Majority		134,403	17.15%	
Turnout		783,624		
Republican hold		Swing		

== See also ==
- List of Minnesota gubernatorial elections
