= Sarah Sibley =

First Lady of Minnesota (1823–1869)

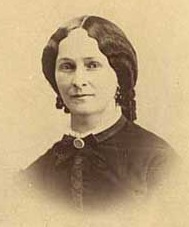
- Sibley c. 1858

First Lady of Minnesota
- In office May 24, 1858 – January 2, 1860
- Governor: Henry Hastings Sibley
- Preceded by: Position established
- Succeeded by: Anna Ramsey

Personal details
- Born: Sarah Jane Steele; February 8, 1823 Lancaster, Pennsylvania, U.S.
- Died: May 21, 1869 (aged 46) Saint Paul, Minnesota, U.S.
- Resting place: Oakland Cemetery
- Spouse: Henry Hastings Sibley
- Relations: Franklin Steele (brother); Thomas R. Potts (in-law)

Sarah Jane Sibley (née Steele; February 8, 1823 – May 21, 1869) was an American preservationist who was the First Lady of Minnesota from 1858 until 1860 during the administration of her husband, Governor Henry Hastings Sibley. Sibley helped organize The Mount Vernon Ladies' Association in Minnesota, where she worked to secure public funds.

== Early life and family ==
Sibley was born Sarah Jane Steele to James Steele and Mary Steele (née Humes) on February 8, 1823, in Lancaster, Pennsylvania. Sarah was the youngest of nine total siblings including her elder brother, Franklin Steele. One of Sarah's sisters, Abbian Steele, was later married to Thomas R. Potts, the first mayor of Saint Paul.^{:88} Sarah's father, James Steele, was a veteran of the War of 1812 who attained the rank of brigadier general.^{:87} James later served as a legislator in the Pennsylvania House of Representatives.

== Marriage to Henry Hastings Sibley ==
Sarah met her future husband Henry Hastings Sibley at the wedding of her brother Franklin in Baltimore on April 14, 1842.^{:84} While Sarah was not the first wife or love interest of Sibley, Sibley quickly courted Sarah when she moved to Minnesota Territory in 1842 to live with her brother Franklin. Sarah married Sibley a year later on May 2, 1843, at Fort Snelling.^{:87} Their wedding was officiated by the post chaplain, Reverend Ezekiel Gear.^{:86} Henry Hasting Sibley was later elected as the first Governor of Minnesota when Minnesota was admitted to the Union on May 11, 1858, making Sarah the first officeholder as the first lady of Minnesota. During their lifetime the Sibley's had a total of nine children; five of which died young.

== First Lady of Minnesota ==
During her tenure as first lady, Sarah was the vice-regent of the Mount Vernon Ladies' Association (MVLA), as well as the MVLA's leading organizer in Minnesota.^{:166}^{:408} The MVLA's intended goal was the preservation of President George Washington's estate, Mount Vernon, which had fallen into disrepair under Washington's great-grandnephew, John Augustine Washington III.^{:408} While Sarah was a critical organizer of the MVLA in Minnesota, her efforts to raise donations for the $300,000 nationwide funding effort only generated $362 from Minnesota donors.^{:408,413} Sarah later suffered from reoccurring pleuritic attacks, particularly in 1859, which caused her to resign as vice-regent of the MVLA.^{:415} The onset of the American Civil War also hindered further efforts of the MVLA nationwide.^{:414–415}

== Later life ==
In 1863 the Sibley family moved to their home, now the Sibley Historic Site, in Saint Paul. By the 1860s Sarah's health had seriously deteriorated since first contracting pleurisy in 1849.^{:415} An 1861 letter from Sibley to his friend William Gates LeDuc stated "I much fear she will not last long, as she has them more frequently than heretofore".^{:415} Sarah would continue to suffer from pleuritic attacks until her death in 1869.

=== Death ===
Sarah Jane Sibley died from pleurisy in Saint Paul at the age of 46 on May 21, 1869.^{:210–212} Sarah is buried in Oakland Cemetery.

Honorary titles
Preceded by Position established	First Lady of Minnesota; 1858–1860	Succeeded by Anna Ramsey
