= 1942 United States Senate special election in Minnesota =

- November 3, 1942
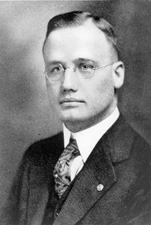

Nominee	Arthur E. Nelson	Al Hansen	John E. O'Rourke
Party	Republican	Farmer–Labor	Democratic
Popular vote	372,240	177,008	114,086
Percentage	56.12%	26.68%	17.20%
- County results Nelson: 40–50% 50–60% 60–70% 70–80% Hansen: 40–50% 50–60%
U.S. senator before election
Joseph H. Ball
Republican
Elected U.S. senator
Arthur E. Nelson
Republican

The 1942 United States Senate special election in Minnesota took place on November 3, 1942. The election was held to fill the vacancy in the seat formerly held by the late Ernest Lundeen for the final two months of Lundeen's unexpired term. Governor Harold Stassen had appointed Joseph H. Ball to fill the seat in 1940, but this appointment was temporary and subject to a special election held in the next general election year thereafter—1942. Ball opted to run for the full six-year term immediately following the end of Lundeen's term, instead of running for election to continue for the remainder of the term. In Ball's stead, the Republican Party of Minnesota nominated Arthur E. Nelson, who, in the special election, defeated both of his challengers—Al Hansen of the Farmer–Labor Party of Minnesota and John E. O'Rourke of the Minnesota Democratic Party.

Following his 1940 appointment and subsequent election, Ball ultimately served the longest tenure of any Senator only elected once.

== Farmer–Labor primary ==
=== Candidates ===
==== Declared ====
- Al Hansen, 1939 Farmer–Labor candidate for Mayor of Minneapolis (unsuccessful)
- John T. Lyons

=== Results ===
Farmer–Labor special primary election results
Party	Candidate	Votes	%
Farmer–Labor	Al Hansen	47,513	52.11%
Farmer–Labor	John T. Lyons	43,660	47.89%
Total votes		91,173	100.00%

== Republican primary ==
=== Candidates ===
==== Declared ====
- Cliff Blanchard
- Harry Lee
- Arthur E. Nelson, Former Mayor of St. Paul (1922–1926)
- Wilber L. Paulson, Former State Representative
- Robert J. Seiberlich
- John A. Thompson
- Mrs. Mat Wagner

=== Results ===
Republican special primary election results
Party	Candidate	Votes	%
Republican	Arthur E. Nelson	148,965	47.41%
Republican	Henry Lee	34,889	11.11%
Republican	Cliff Blanchard	33,331	10.61%
Republican	John A. Thompson	31,330	9.97%
Republican	Mrs. Mat Wagner	26,117	8.31%
Republican	Robert J. Seiberlich	21,629	6.88%
Republican	Wilber L. Paulson	17,933	5.71%
Total votes		314,194	100.00%

== Special election ==
=== Results ===
Special election results
Party	Candidate	Votes	%
Republican	Arthur E. Nelson	372,240	56.12%
Farmer–Labor	Al Hansen	177,008	26.68%
Democratic	John E. O'Rourke	114,086	17.20%
Total votes		663,334	100.00%
Majority		195,232	29.44%
Republican hold			

== See also ==
- 1942 United States Senate elections
