= Clinical Tuberculosis =

1966 non-fiction book

Clinical Tuberculosis: Essentials of Diagnosis and Treatment
- Editor: Karl H. Pfuetze and David B. Radner
- Publisher: Charles C. Thomas
- Publication date: 1966
- OCLC: 937960

Clinical Tuberculosis: Essentials of Diagnosis and Treatment is a non-fiction book edited by Karl H. Pfuetze and David B. Radner and sponsored by the American College of Chest Physicians. Published in 1966 by Charles C. Thomas, it includes thirty-seven chapters on tuberculosis written by thirty-nine contributors.

A 1967 review in JAMA described the book as "too long for a simple listing of recommendations but too short for critical coverage", and felt that the book lacked clear recommendations for physicians in some places and did not offer a "full presentation of current ideas". The reviewer felt that the quality varied by chapter, and described those written about mycobacterial infections and treatments as some of the better sections. The book was reviewed in two separate issues of the Archives of Internal Medicine. The 1966 review felt that too much discussion of surgery considering the "increasing infrequency with which surgery is used in treating any form of tuberculosis", while the 1967 review praised the amount of subjects covered as well as the editing, writing, and overall "simplicity" of the text. A review in The Journal-Lancet similarly praised the book for its organization, clarity, and number of topics covered.
