= Songs of Hope Summer Camp =

International Performing Arts Summer Camp

Coordinates: 44.9497°N 93.1545°W

Songs of Hope is an international performing arts summer camp in Minnesota, United States, founded in 1990 by the Minnesota nonprofit organization, Sounds of Hope Ltd. The camp hosts children aged 10–13 from the United States and abroad, who participate in a program built around cultural sharing. The country delegations are partly subsidized by corporate and foundation donors. The project also has a focus on performance, and the children go on a three-week concert tour at the end of the six-week program each summer.

== History ==
The first Songs of Hope project took place in 1991, and was the idea of Jeanne Junge, a performing arts educator, and Tom Surprenant, a staff member at Dartmouth College Outward Bound School, both residents of Saint Paul, Minnesota. They began designing a program for young people focused on travel, cultural experiences, music, and experiential education, which became the Songs of Hope project. Their idea was to bring delegations of one boy and girl aged 10–13 from different countries to perform an international concert for local audiences.

With help from Saint Paul Mayor James Scheibel, they asked friends and community leaders, including Dick Cohen and Mark Dayton, to join their first board of advisors or to make donations, and then asked community philanthropists to provide funding. They also approached the committees of Saint Paul's six international sister cities in Japan, Italy, China, Mexico, the Soviet Union, and South Africa, asking them to organize delegations of young performers, which all of them did apart from Lawaaikamp, South Africa, which was unable to participate for financial reasons.

The delegations from the five sister cities each also included one adult chaperone. Most of the young people lived in shared rooms in a dormitory at St. Catherine University in St. Paul. Rehearsals were held on the college campus. For financial reasons, only ten of the US participants lived on site; the other eleven performed in the concert, but commuted to and from rehearsals daily. The first program was three weeks long, culminating with a single concert on the stage of St. Catherine's O'Shaughnessy Auditorium. The second took place in 1994, and then every year after that.

== Charity outreach ==
The project is non-profit, with a twin goal of preparing its youth participants to be global citizens with a respect for world cultures, and providing concerts to under-served audiences.

The project subsidizes the participation of children from low-income families in the US and abroad thanks to donations from state and federal funding agencies such as the Metropolitan Regional Arts Council and the National Endowment for the Arts (NEA), and private funders such as the Travelers Foundation and General Mills Foundation. This funding also enables the organizers to stage low-cost outreach concerts to audiences who have less access to global music or who are unable to attend many live art events due to disabilities.

== Awards and Accomplishments ==
Since 1991, the program has performed more than 400 concerts to over 90,000 people, ranging from full 90-minute shows to 20-minute arts-in-service concerts. The first project in 1991 received an Award of Excellence from Sister Cities International and Reader's Digest. It later also received a Peacemaker Award for its service to local youth from the Office of the Minnesota Lieutenant Governor. In 2004, 2005, and 2008 the program was one of 50 semifinalists in the Presidential Coming Up Taller Awards, which are sponsored by the President's Committee on the Arts and Humanities, the NEA, the Institute of Museum and Library Services, and the National Endowment for the Humanities. The project has twice received an Access to Artistic Excellence grant from the NEA for a long-term project to tour gradually down the Mississippi River.
