= 1928 United States Senate election in Minnesota =

- November 6, 1928
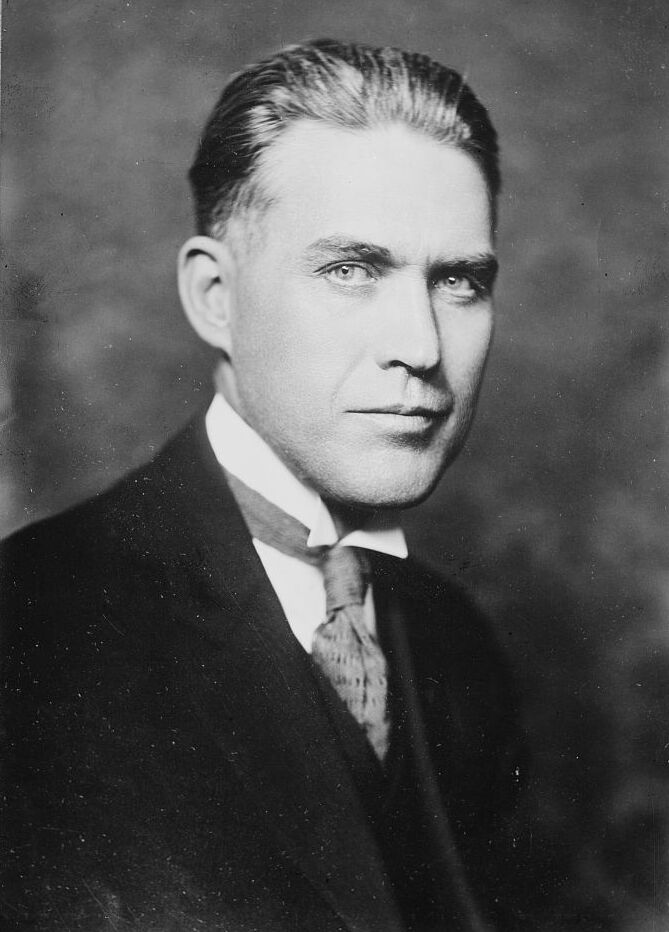

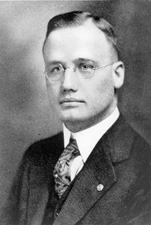
| Nominee | Henrik Shipstead | Arthur E. Nelson |
| Party | Farmer–Labor | Republican |
| Popular vote | 665,169 | 342,992 |
| Percentage | 65.38% | 33.71% |
- County results Shipstead: 50–60% 60–70% 70–80% 80–90%
U.S. senator before election
Henrik Shipstead
Farmer–Labor
Elected U.S. Senator
Henrik Shipstead
Farmer–Labor

The 1928 United States Senate election in Minnesota took place on November 6, 1928. Incumbent Farmer–Labor U.S. Senator Henrik Shipstead defeated his Republican challenger, former St. Paul mayor Arthur E. Nelson, to win a second term.

== Farmer–Labor primary ==
=== Candidates ===
==== Declared ====
- Henrik Shipstead, Incumbent U.S. Senator since 1923
- William Watkins, Switchman and resident of Minneapolis

=== Results ===
Farmer–Labor primary election results
| Party | Candidate | Votes | % |
|---|---|---|---|
| Farmer–Labor | Henrik Shipstead (Incumbent) | 86,093 | 90.03% |
| Farmer–Labor | William Watkins | 9,529 | 9.97% |
| Total votes | | 95,622 | 100.00% |

== Republican primary ==
=== Candidates ===
==== Declared ====
- J. A. A. Burnquist, 19th Governor of Minnesota (1915–1921), former state Representative from the 33rd HD (1909–1913), former Lieutenant Governor (1913–1915), candidate for U.S. Senate in 1923, resident of St. Paul
- Arthur E. Nelson, 35th Mayor of St. Paul (1922–1926), attorney
- A. J. Rockne, State Senator since 1911, and 29th Speaker of the Minnesota House of Representatives (1909–1911), former state Representative from the 29th HD (1903–1911), attorney from Zumbrota

=== Results ===
Republican primary election results
| Party | Candidate | Votes | % |
|---|---|---|---|
| Republican | Arthur E. Nelson | 111,184 | 42.24% |
| Republican | J. A. A. Burnquist | 80,198 | 30.47% |
| Republican | A. J. Rockne | 71,828 | 27.29% |
| Total votes | | 263,210 | 100.00% |

== General election ==
=== Results ===
General election results
| Party | Candidate | Votes | % |
|---|---|---|---|
| Farmer–Labor | Henrik Shipstead (Incumbent) | 665,169 | 65.38% |
| Republican | Arthur E. Nelson | 342,992 | 33.71% |
| Workers (Communist) | Vincent R. Dunne | 9,280 | 0.91% |
| Total votes | | 1,017,441 | 100.00% |
| Majority | | 322,177 | 31.67% |
| Farmer–Labor hold | | | |

== See also ==
- United States Senate elections, 1928
