= 1936 Minnesota lieutenant gubernatorial election =

Minnesota lieutenant gubernatorial election, 1936
- November 3, 1936
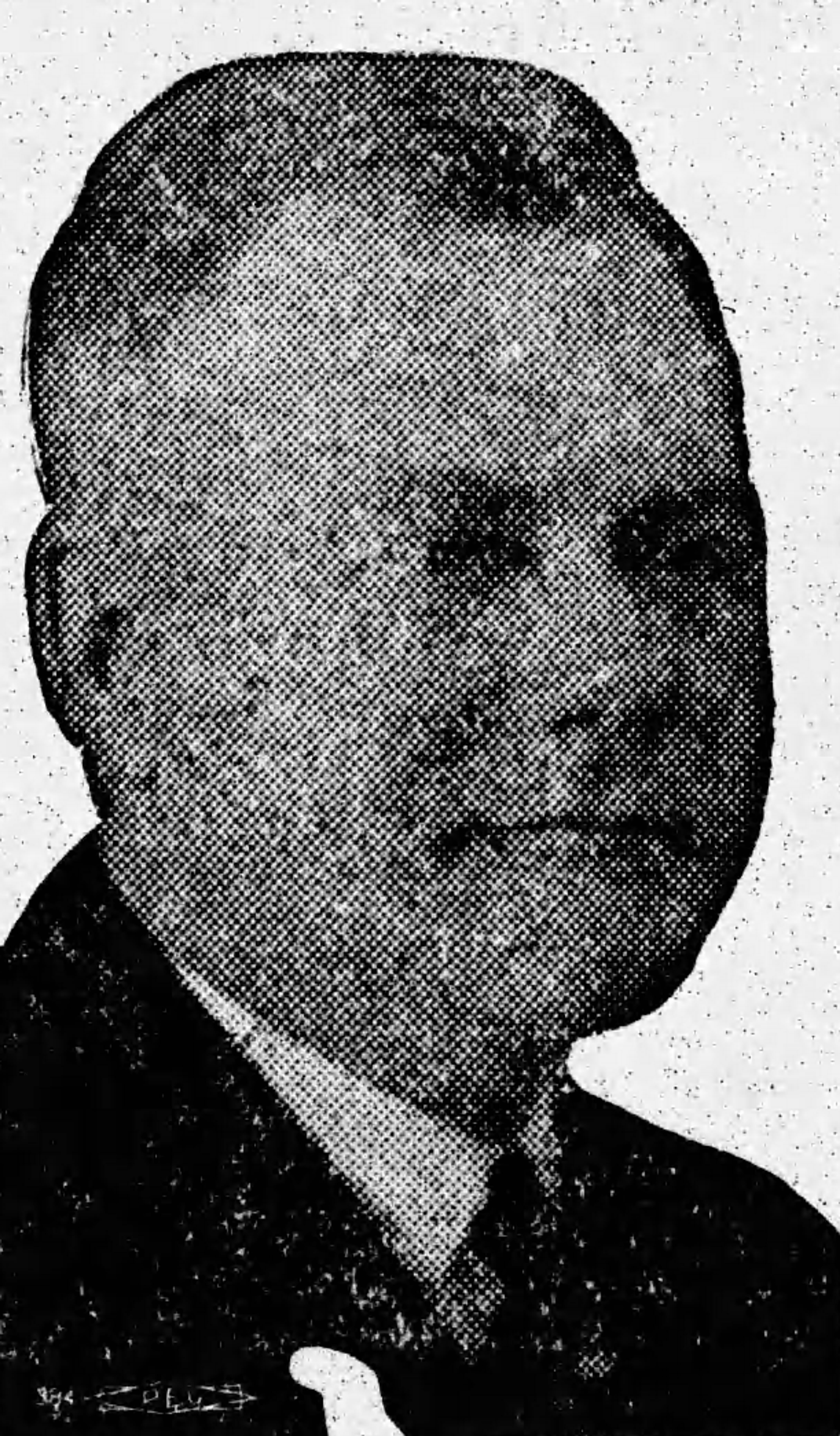

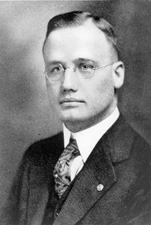

Nominee	Gottfrid Lindsten	Arthur E. Nelson	A. C. Knudson
Party	Farmer–Labor	Republican	Democratic
Popular vote	502,856	403,412	153,357
Percentage	47.46%	38.07%	14.47%
- County results Lindsten: 40–50% 50–60% 60–70% Nelson: 30–40% 40–50% 50–60%
Lieutenant Governor before election
William B. Richardson (Acting)
Republican
Elected Lieutenant Governor
Gottfrid Lindsten
Farmer–Labor

The 1936 Minnesota lieutenant gubernatorial election took place on November 3, 1936. Minnesota Farmer–Labor Party candidate Gottfrid Lindsten defeated Republican Party of Minnesota challenger Arthur E. Nelson and Minnesota Democratic Party candidate A. C. Knudson.

== Results ==
1936 lieutenant gubernatorial election, Minnesota
Party	Candidate	Votes	%	±%
Farmer–Labor	Gottfrid Lindsten	502,856	47.46%	+3.82%
Republican	Arthur E. Nelson	403,412	38.07%	+4.31%
Democratic	A. C. Knudson	153,357	14.47%	−8.13%
Majority		99,444	9.39%	
Turnout		1,059,625		
Farmer–Labor hold		Swing		
