= Franklin Steele =

American politician and businessman (1813–1880)

- Born: c. 1813; Chester County, Pennsylvania, U.S.
- Died: September 10, 1880 (aged 67); Minneapolis, Minnesota, U.S.
- Resting place: Oak Hill Cemetery; Washington, D.C., U.S.
- Children: 3
- Relatives: Sarah Sibley (sister); Henry Sibley (brother-in-law); Thomas R. Potts (brother-in-law); Erskine Gwynne (great-grandson)

Franklin Steele (c. 1813 – September 10, 1880) was an early settler of Minneapolis, Minnesota. Born in Chester County, Pennsylvania, of Scottish descent, Steele worked in the Lancaster, Pennsylvania, post office as a young man, where he once met President James Buchanan.

== Career ==
With encouragement from his future brother-in-law Henry Hastings Sibley, Steele saw opportunities in the western frontier and traveled to Fort Snelling via the steamboat Burlington, arriving June 18, 1838; he soon became a storekeeper at the fort. At that time, the land on both sides of the Mississippi River at St. Anthony Falls was controlled by the U.S. government as part of the Fort Snelling Reservation. However, by 1837 over 150 squatters had staked unofficial claims on fort property. In 1838, the fort commander, Joseph Plympton convinced the government to release the east bank of the river for settlement, hoping to stake a personal claim on the valuable land closest to the falls. But Steele staked the first claim on the land before sunrise on the first day of the legal settlement. He claimed a half-mile of east-bank riverfront, controlling half of the water power of St. Anthony Falls; adjacent property was claimed by Pierre Bottineau (1817–1895), a Métis, of French-Canadian, Ojibwe, and Dakota descent.

Steele's sister, Abbian, married a prominent physician, Thomas R. Potts, in 1847. Potts later became the first Mayor of St. Paul. Likewise, Steele's other sister, Sarah Jane Steele, was married to Henry Hastings Sibley in 1843.^{:87}

=== Lumber mills ===
Eventually, in 1847, Steele secured financing, in the form of $12,000 for a 90 percent stake in the property. On May 18, 1848, President Polk approved the claims made in St. Anthony, and Steele was able to build his dam on the east side of the river above the falls, blocking the east channel. The dam extended diagonally into the river 700 feet (210 meters), was 16 feet (5 m) high, and was secured to the limestone riverbed. Its thickness tapered from 40 feet (12 m) wide at its base to 12 feet (4 m) wide at the top. Steele dispatched logging crews to the Crow Wing River in December 1847 to supply pine for his sawmill, and by September 1, 1848, sawing commenced using two up-down saws. He was able to sell the lumber readily, supplying construction projects in the booming town. The new community at the falls attracted entrepreneurs from New England, many of whom had experience in lumber and milling. He had hired Ard Godfrey to help build and run the first commercial sawmill at the falls. Godfrey knew the most efficient ways to use natural resources, like the falls, and the great pine forests, to make lumber products. Godfrey built the first home in St. Anthony, Steele had the town platted in 1849, and it incorporated in 1855.

=== Foothold on west bank ===
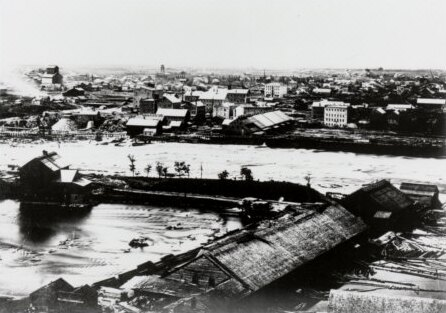
Looking northeast across the river c. 1868

Although St. Anthony was beginning to prosper, the west side of the Mississippi remained under the control of Fort Snelling. Late in 1849, Steele convinced his friend, John H. Stevens, to negotiate a deal to secure 160 acres (64.7 ha) in present-day Minneapolis. In exchange, Stevens would ferry troops across the river to supply the new Fort Ripley. In the summer of 1851, the Treaty of Traverse des Sioux was "negotiated" wresting nearly all remaining Minnesotan land from the Indians. In 1852 Congress passed a bill to relinquish 26,000 acres (10,522 ha) of Ft. Snelling, opening the door for the ultimate development of Minneapolis. By 1854, three-hundred squatters occupied the area, and in 1855 Congress recognized the squatters' right to purchase the land they had claimed. The west side quickly developed scores of new mills and consortia. They built a dam diagonally into the river to the north, which, along with Steele's dam created the inverted V-shape, still apparent today. Steele created the St. Anthony Falls Water Power Company in 1856 with three New York financiers. The company struggled for several years, due to poor relations with the financiers, a depression, and the Civil War. In 1868 the firm reorganized with new officers including John Pillsbury, Richard and Samuel Chute, Sumner Farnham, and Frederick Butterfield.

=== First Mississippi River bridge ===
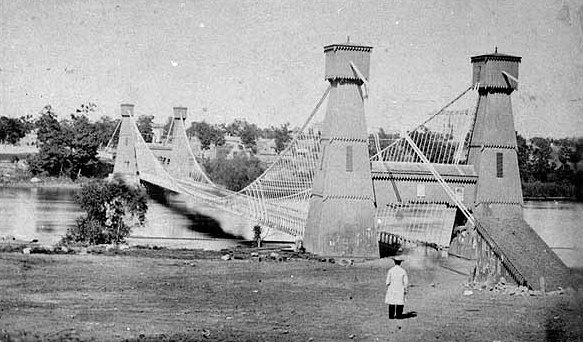
Steele's first bridge ca. 1865

The two communities of Minneapolis and St. Anthony shared the resources of the falls. Both towns grew quickly and developed several industries at the falls. The earliest waterpowered facilities were sawmills; flour mills soon followed. For many years, river crossing between the communities was via a rope-drawn ferry, by foot when the river surface was frozen, or on floating log booms that often filled the channel.

Franklin Steele

Although he ran one such ferry, as early as 1852, Steele anticipated a need for a permanent bridge to span the river near present-day Hennepin Avenue. He formed the Mississippi Bridge Company to build a 620-foot (189 m)-long, 17-foot (5 m) wide suspension bridge, linking Minneapolis to Nicollet Island and hired Thomas Griffith to design it. The bridge was opened on January 23, 1855, with a large celebration. As a private enterprise, tolls were levied: five cents per pedestrian, twenty-five cents per horse-drawn wagon, and two cents for swine and sheep.

Steele had previously (in 1853) built a shorter bridge to cross the channel from Nicollet Island to St. Anthony; together these created the first permanent bridge to span the Mississippi at any point along its length. They linked the two cities, which legally merged in 1872, taking the name Minneapolis: a compound of the Dakota Indian word, "minne" or "mni" for "water", and the Greek "polis" for city.

=== Purchase of Fort Snelling ===
By 1858, Franklin Steele bought the fort and 8,000 acres (3,200 hectares) surrounding it for $90,000, as the government no longer needed a frontier outpost at that location. But during the Civil War, he leased it back to the government for use as an induction station. After the war was over Steele leased the land to settlers and the city began to grow. The town of Minneapolis was incorporated as a city in 1867. He ultimately became prosperous from lumber sales, the development of a suspension bridge, and various land deals.

=== University of Minnesota ===
In 1851, the Minnesota Territorial Legislature created a college-preparatory school in Minneapolis. Steele donated four acres, located in St. Anthony, to the newly-created institution.

== Death ==
Steele died on September 10, 1880, in Minneapolis, Minnesota. He was buried in Oak Hill Cemetery.

== Places bearing his name ==
- Steele County, Minnesota
- Franklin Steele Square in Minneapolis, Minnesota
- Franklin Avenue in Minneapolis, Minnesota

== See also ==
- History of Minneapolis
- Mill District, Minneapolis
