= Edward Delaney (disambiguation) =

Edward Delaney or DeLaney may refer to:

- Edward Leo Delaney (1885–1972), American broadcaster of Nazi propaganda during World War II
- Edward K. Delaney (1909–1973), mayor of St. Paul, Minnesota
- Edward Delaney (1930–2009), Irish sculptor
- Edward J. Delaney (born 1957), American film-maker and journalist
- Edward DeLaney (fl. 2009), American politician from Indiana
