= Minnesota Clean Indoor Air Act =

Clean Indoor Air Act

69th Minnesota Legislature
- Citation: 144.411 to 144.417
- Signed by: Wendell Anderson
- Signed: June 2, 1975
- Effective: June 2, 1975
- Bill citation: HF 75
- Status: In force

The Minnesota Clean Indoor Air Act (MCIAA) is a law in the state of Minnesota prohibiting smoking in most indoor spaces. The law is enforced by the Minnesota Department of Health.

The law was the first of its kind in the United States. It was championed by the Minnesota Medical Association, and Minnesota Health Commissioner of Health Brooke Cunningham called it the "one of our greatest public health achievements." The MCIAA would be expanded in 2007 by the Freedom to Breath Act. The MCIAA would be expanded a second time in 2019, to explicitly extend the law's prohibitions to vapes and e-cigarettes.

== Provisions ==
The law bans smoking in most indoor spaces, including but not limited to restaurants, offices, retail stores, public transit, schools, daycares, and health facilities.

The law allows smoking in personal homes, vehicles, outdoors, scientific studies, traditional native american ceremonies, and theatrical productions, among other circumstances.

== See also ==
- Smoking ban
- List of smoking bans
- List of smoking bans in the United States
