= Laurence C. Hodgson =

American mayor (1874–1937)

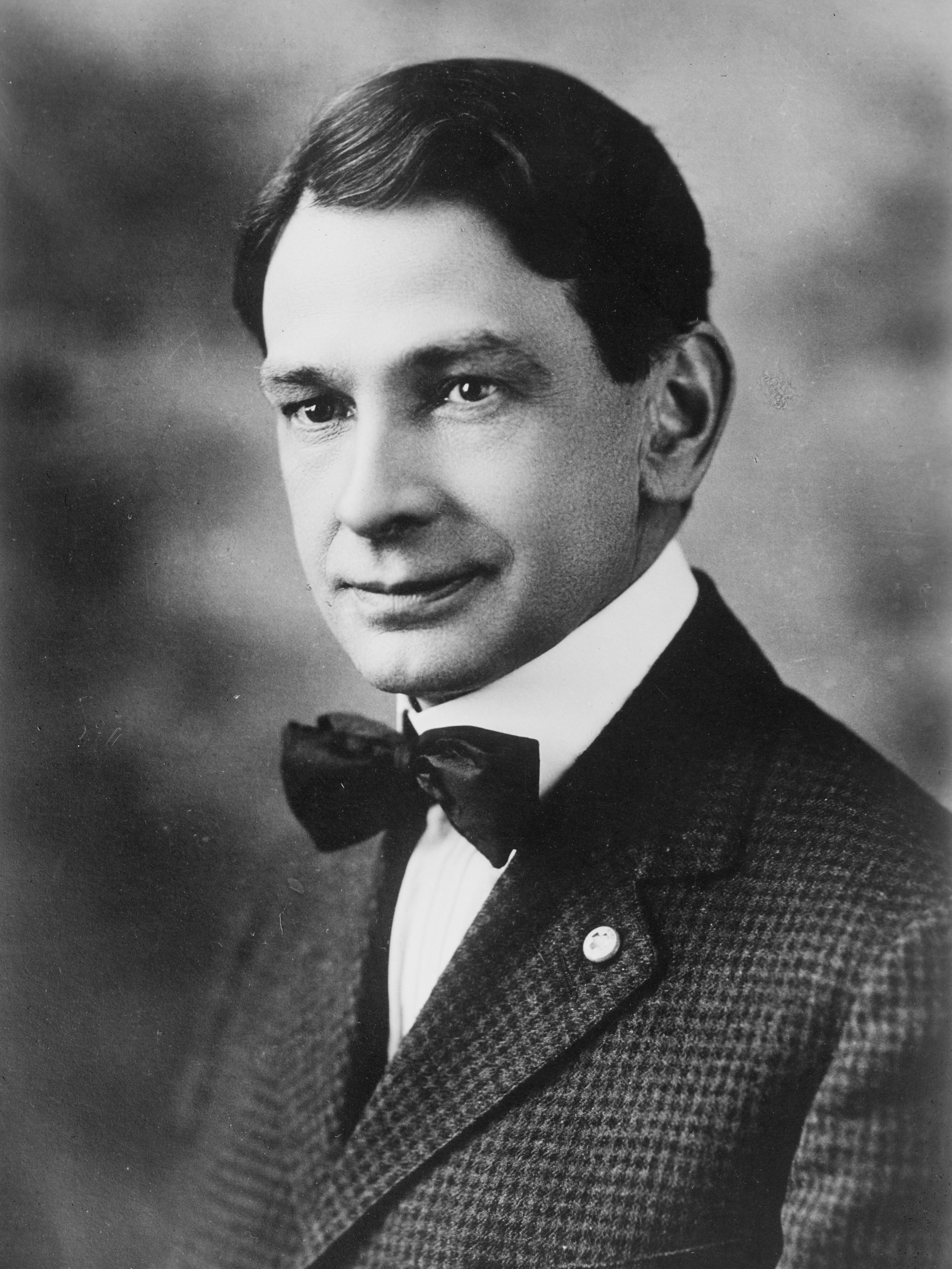
- Hodgson in 1919

34th & 36th Mayor of Saint Paul
- In office 1926–1930
- Preceded by: Arthur E. Nelson
- Succeeded by: Gerhard J. Bundlie
- In office 1918–1922
- Preceded by: Vivian R. Irvin
- Succeeded by: Arthur E. Nelson

Personal details
- Born: Laurence Curran Hodgson; November 6, 1874 Hastings, Minnesota, U.S.
- Died: March 24, 1937 (aged 62) Saint Paul, Minnesota, U.S.
- Party: Democratic
- Occupation: Journalist

Laurence Curran Hodgson (November 6, 1874 – March 24, 1937) was an American newspaper journalist, poet, and politician from Saint Paul, Minnesota.

== Biography ==
Hodgson was a newspaper reporter and columnist, writing at different times for the Minneapolis Times and the St. Paul Dispatch-Pioneer Press. He had a column that appeared daily on the back page of the Dispatch called "Cabbages and Kings," a reference to Lewis Carroll's poem, "The Walrus and the Carpenter."

He commonly wrote under the pen name "Larry Ho." The name came about when he had written his first feature article for the Times. He was signing his name, "Larry Hodgson," but his pencil broke after the first "o." The city editor, James Gray, reportedly said, "Better let it go at that–'Larry Ho.'"

He served as secretary to both St. Paul mayors Winn Powers and Vivian R. Irvin, and upon the expiration of Irvin's term, he was elected mayor by a large majority. He served two non-consecutive terms as mayor from 1918 to 1922, and from 1926 to 1930.

Hodgson also ran for governor in 1920, but came third in the race, garnering only 81,293 votes.

After Hodgson's death in 1937, his son, Laurence K. Hodgson, edited and published a book called "Howdy Folks: Selections from the Writings, Verse and Speeches of Larry Ho."

Party political offices
Preceded by Fred Wheaton	Democratic nominee for Governor of Minnesota; 1920	Succeeded by Edward Indrehus
Political offices
Preceded by Vivian R. Irvin	Mayor of St. Paul; 1918 – 1922	Succeeded by Arthur E. Nelson
Preceded by Arthur E. Nelson	Mayor of St. Paul; 1926 – 1930	Succeeded by Gerhard J. Bundlie
