= John J. McDonough (mayor) =

American politician and lawyer (1895–1962)

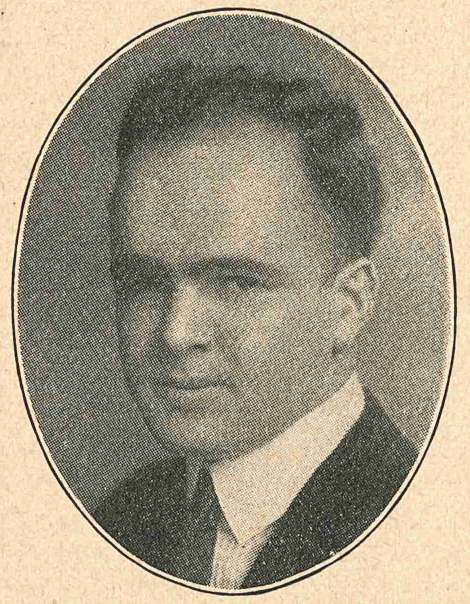
- McDonough in 1927

41st Mayor of Saint Paul, Minnesota
- In office 1940–1948
- Preceded by: William H. Fallon
- Succeeded by: Edward K. Delaney

Member of the Minnesota House of Representatives from the 38th district
- In office January 6, 1925 – January 7, 1935

Minnesota House Majority Leader
- In office 1933–1935
- Preceded by: Willis I. Norton
- Succeeded by: Roy E. Dunn

Personal details
- Born: September 25, 1895 Saint Paul, Minnesota, U.S.
- Died: February 27, 1962 (aged 66) Saint Paul, Minnesota, U.S.
- Party: Democratic (DFL)
- Education: Saint Thomas Academy; University of Minnesota; Saint Paul College of Law (LLB)
- Profession: Politician, lawyer

John J. McDonough (September 25, 1895 – February 27, 1962) was an American lawyer and Democratic politician who served as the 41st mayor of Saint Paul, Minnesota, from 1940 to 1948.

== Life and career ==
McDonough was born in Saint Paul in 1895. He attended Saint Thomas Academy and the University of Minnesota before earning a law degree at the Saint Paul College of Law in 1918. He worked as a lawyer and served in the Minnesota House of Representatives for five terms from 1925 to 1935. While he was nonpartisan, he was well known for fighting prohibition and held a mixture of conservative legal beliefs but liberal political ones. He was elected mayor of Saint Paul in 1940. While in office in 1946 he suffered a stroke which left him largely paralyzed (though mentally alert) for the remainder of his life. He died in Saint Paul on February 27, 1962.

Political offices
Preceded by Willis I. Norton	Minnesota House Majority Leader; 1933-1935	Succeeded by Roy E. Dunn
