= Arthur E. Nelson =

American politician (1892–1955)

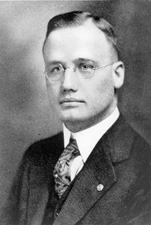

United States Senator from Minnesota
- In office November 18, 1942 – January 3, 1943
- Preceded by: Joseph H. Ball
- Succeeded by: Joseph H. Ball

35th Mayor of St. Paul
- In office 1922–1926
- Preceded by: Laurence C. Hodgson
- Succeeded by: Laurence C. Hodgson

Personal details
- Born: Arthur Emanuel Nelson; May 10, 1892 Browns Valley, Minnesota, U.S.
- Died: April 11, 1955 (aged 62) Chicago, Illinois, U.S.
- Resting place: Oakland Cemetery, Saint Paul, Minnesota
- Party: Republican

Arthur Emanuel Nelson (May 10, 1892 – April 11, 1955) was an American lawyer and politician who served briefly as a U.S. senator from Minnesota during the end of 1942 and beginning of 1943.

== Early life and education ==
Born in Browns Valley, Minnesota, Arthur Nelson graduated from Macalester College in 1912 and William Mitchell College of Law (then the St. Paul College of Law) in 1915. He also served briefly in the U.S. Army from August to November 1918.

== Political career ==
Nelson was elected Mayor of Saint Paul, Minnesota, in 1922. He served two two-year terms. Nelson unsuccessfully ran for the United States Senate as a Republican in 1928 against Henrik Shipstead (receiving 33.4% of the vote).

=== Senate ===
He was elected to the Senate fourteen years later, in November 1942 to finish out the term of deceased Senator Ernest Lundeen, which had temporarily been filled by appointee Joseph H. Ball (who won the November 1942 election for the full six-year term from 1943 to 1949). Nelson served less than two months, from November 18, 1942, to January 3, 1943. He never sought re-election.

== Death ==
Nelson died in Chicago, Illinois on April 11, 1955, he is buried in Oakland Cemetery in Saint Paul, Minnesota.

== Notes ==
- United States Congress. "Arthur E. Nelson (id: N000030)". Biographical Directory of the United States Congress.

Party political offices
Preceded by Frank B. Kellogg	Republican nominee for U.S. Senator from Minnesota (Class 1); 1928	Succeeded by N. J. Holmberg
Preceded by Franklin Ellsworth	Republican nominee for Lieutenant Governor of Minnesota; 1936	Succeeded by C. Elmer Anderson
Preceded by Theodore Christianson	Republican nominee for U.S. Senator from Minnesota (Class 2); 1942	Succeeded by Joseph H. Ball
U.S. Senate
Preceded by Joseph H. Ball	United States Senator from Minnesota; 1942–1943; Served alongside: Henrik Shipstead	Succeeded by Joseph Ball
