= Thomas R. Potts =

American physician

Thomas Reed Potts
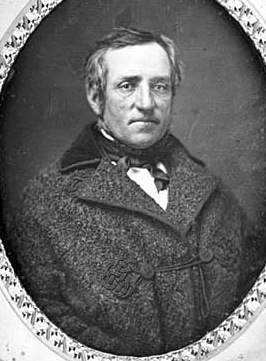
- c. 1855

1st Mayor of St. Paul
- In office 1850–1851
- Preceded by: None
- Succeeded by: Robert Kennedy
- Constituency: Saint Paul, Minnesota

Personal details
- Born: February 10, 1810 Philadelphia, Pennsylvania
- Died: October 6, 1874 (aged 64) Saint Paul, Minnesota
- Spouse: Anna Abby Steele
- Children: 4
- Profession: physician

Thomas Reed Potts (February 10, 1810 – October 6, 1874) was an American medical doctor, civic leader and the first Mayor of St. Paul, Minnesota. After graduating from medical school, Potts moved across the country and eventually found his way to the young settlement of St. Paul. Active in civic life and popular in his medical practice, he was elected as the first President of the Town Board. Despite a successful tenure, he tired of politics and retired after one term to continue his practice; however he did hold several key health-related positions. By the time of his death, he was the oldest doctor in the city and one of its most respected.

== Early years ==
Potts was born in Philadelphia, Pennsylvania, to Rev. George Charles Potts, D.D., of the Fourth Presbyterian Church of Philadelphia. In 1831 he graduated with a medical degree from the University of Pennsylvania School of Medicine.

After medical school, Potts settled in Natchez, Mississippi, for ten years. He moved to Galena, Illinois, in 1841, and then to Saint Paul, Minnesota, in 1849. In 1847 he married Anna Abbian Steele (born 1821 in Steelville, Pennsylvania, died 1901 in St. Paul), sister of prosperous Minneapolis businessman Franklin Steele, in Fort Snelling. They had four children: daughters Mary Steele and C. W. and sons Charles and Henry.

Potts was a pioneer physician in St. Paul and one of the organizers of the Minnesota Historical Society, which formed in 1849. He practiced medicine in St. Paul for 26 years. During his years of practice he served as contract physician to Fort Snelling, physician to the Dakota, Medical Purveyor of the district, and Pension Surgeon.

== President of the Town Board of St. Paul ==
On May 6, 1850, according to the provisions of the newly formed town's charter, the first election of "house-holders of the town" was held. Potts was elected as the first President of the Town Board, an office equivalent to mayor, in an election was not seriously contested. He served alongside future St. Paul mayor Edmund Rice, who served as City Recorder. The role of President of the Town Board, in addition to the duties currently held by the Mayor of St. Paul, also included the role of conservator of the peace; this included acting as the early municipal court and exercising jurisdiction over all criminal matters within the town. As the police force of the city consisted of one man, Potts would have to summon him to keep order over any cases he would hear. Since St. Paul did not yet have a jail, those sentenced would be sent to Fort Snelling. Potts served until 1851 and, tired of politics, declined reelection.

== Later years and legacy ==
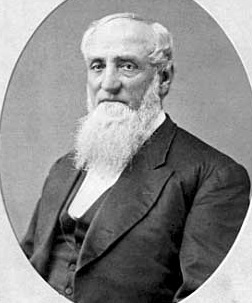
Potts in 1872.

In 1853 he was one of the founding members of the Minnesota Medical Association, serving as its first president. In 1866 he was elected as City Physician, and as health officer of St. Paul in 1873. It was while serving as health officer that he died suddenly on October 6, 1874. By the time of his death he was the senior practicing physician of the city.

Potts lived for many years in a small, white house on Roberts Street in St. Paul, and despite having a large practice and many offices did not care much about money. He left little in ways of property to his widow, who later lived for a time with the family of Henry Hastings Sibley, who was her brother-in-law. His daughter Mary Steele married Crawford Livingston, a successful banker and businessman, on January 28, 1875. His widow went to live with them at their home on 432 Summit Avenue, and later died there on February 1, 1901; she was 80 years of age. His son Henry S. Potts worked as a county surveyor in Ramsey County, led a party up to the Klondike Gold Rush, and returned to continue public service.

During his years in St. Paul, Potts was described as an "institution" and "a man everybody liked and of whom an unkind word was never said." His personality was described as fun, humorous and social, and his practice was termed "kind-hearted". He was considered a strong candidate for any elected position in Ramsey County; however he despised politics and after his brief term as mayor decided to stick to the practice of medicine.
