= Rebecca Noecker =

American politician

President of the Saint Paul City Council
- Incumbent
- Assumed office February 12, 2025
- Preceded by: Mitra Jalali

Member of the Saint Paul City Council from Ward 2
- Incumbent
- Assumed office 2016

Personal details
- Born: Saint Louis Park, Minnesota
- Party: Democratic (DFL)
- Education: Harvard University
- Website: Council website

Rebecca Noecker is an American politician from Saint Paul, Minnesota. A member of the Minnesota Democratic-Farmer-Labor Party, she has been representing ward 2 on the Saint Paul City Council since 2016. She has served as the council's president since February 2025.

== Early life and education ==
Noecker was born in Saint Louis Park, the daughter of two VA Medical Center physicians. She graduated from Harvard University.

== Political career ==
Rebecca Noecker was first elected to the Saint Paul City Council in 2015, winning in the second round of ranked-choice tabulation, and took office in 2016. Her ward includes much of Saint Paul's West Side and parts of downtown. Prior to seeking elected office, Noecker worked with a public school nonprofit and was a member of the city's planning commission.

In February 2025, council president Mitra Jalali resigned from the council in order to focus on her health. A week after Jalali's last meeting, the council elected Noecker to succeed her. As president, she worked to end the city's contract with Flock Safety security cameras, citing a need for transparency and trust.

Noecker announced her candidacy for Ramsey County Commissioner in the 2026 election after incumbent Rafael Ortega announced he was not seeking reelection for District 5. After a close race in the nonpartisan primary, she and María Isa Pérez-Vega will continue to the general election.

== Personal life ==
Noecker lives in the West Side neighborhood of St. Paul with her husband and two sons.
