= 1934 Minnesota lieutenant gubernatorial election =

Minnesota lieutenant gubernatorial election, 1934
- November 6, 1934
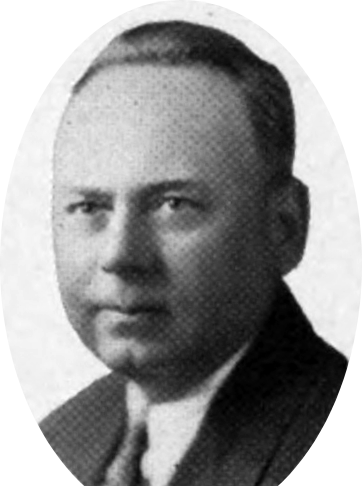

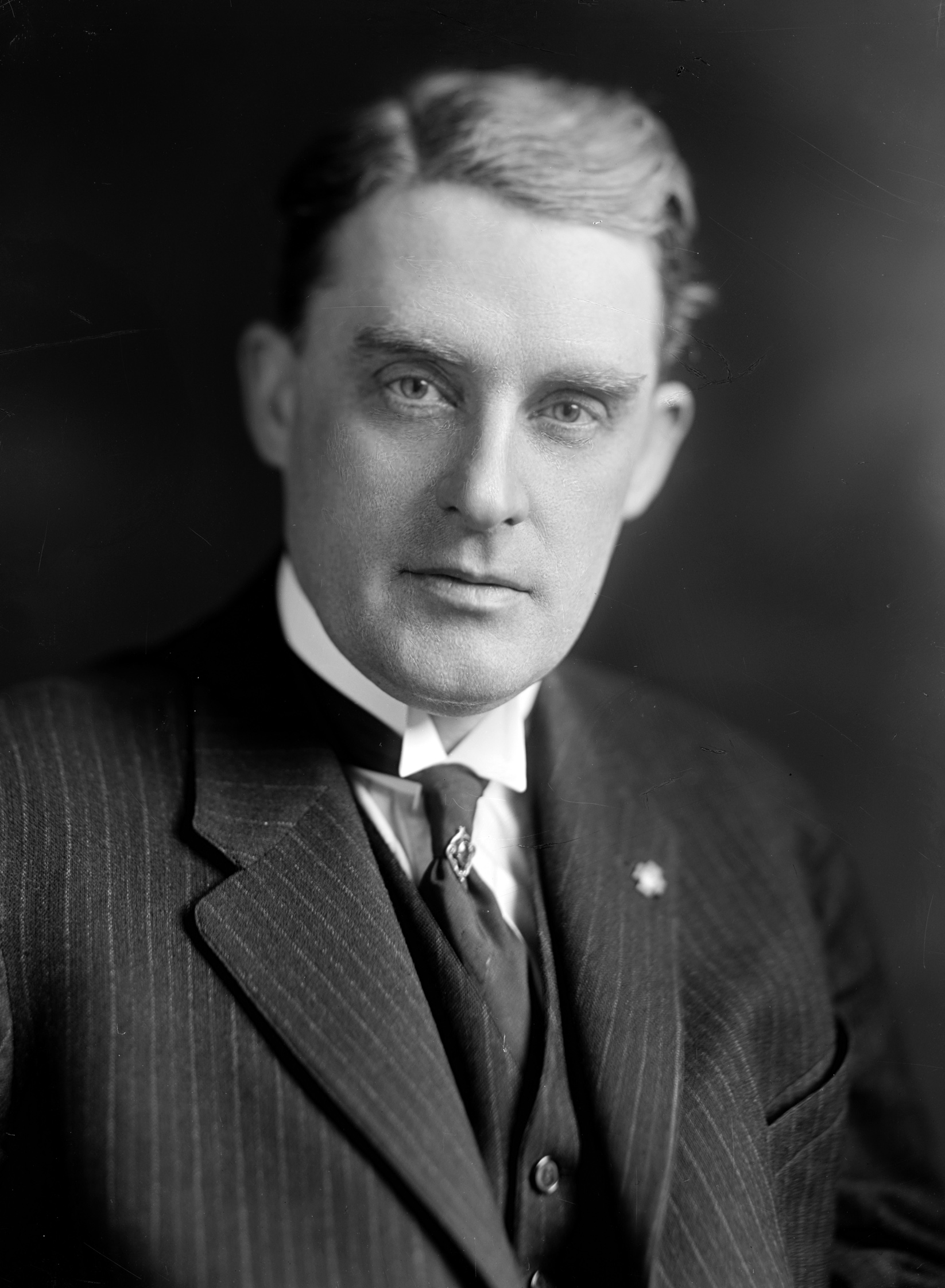

| Nominee | Hjalmar Petersen | Franklin F. Ellsworth | Arthur D. Reynolds |
| Party | Farmer–Labor | Republican | Democratic |
| Popular vote | 428,897 | 331,747 | 222,144 |
| Percentage | 43.64% | 33.76% | 22.6% |
Lieutenant Governor before election
Konrad K. Solberg
Farmer–Labor
Elected Lieutenant Governor
Hjalmar Petersen
Farmer–Labor

The 1934 Minnesota lieutenant gubernatorial election took place on November 6, 1934. Minnesota Farmer–Labor Party candidate Hjalmar Petersen defeated Republican Party of Minnesota challenger Franklin F. Ellsworth and Minnesota Democratic Party candidate Arthur D. Reynolds.

== Results ==
1934 Lieutenant Gubernatorial Election, Minnesota
| Party | Candidate | Votes | % | ±% |
|---|---|---|---|---|
| Farmer–Labor | Hjalmar Petersen | 428,897 | 43.64% | −1.70% |
| Republican | Franklin F. Ellsworth | 331,747 | 33.76% | +0.60% |
| Democratic | Arthur D. Reynolds | 222,144 | 22.60% | +2.17% |
| Majority | | 97,150 | 9.88% | |
| Turnout | | 982,788 | | |
| Farmer–Labor hold | | Swing | | |
