= Saint Paul City Council =

City Council

Type
- Type: Unicameral
- Term limits: None

Leadership
- President: Rebecca Noecker since February 12, 2025

Structure
- Seats: 7
- Length of term: 4 years

Elections
- Voting system: Instant-runoff voting
- Last election: November 7, 2023
- Next election: November 2, 2027
- Redistricting: Charter Commission

Meeting place
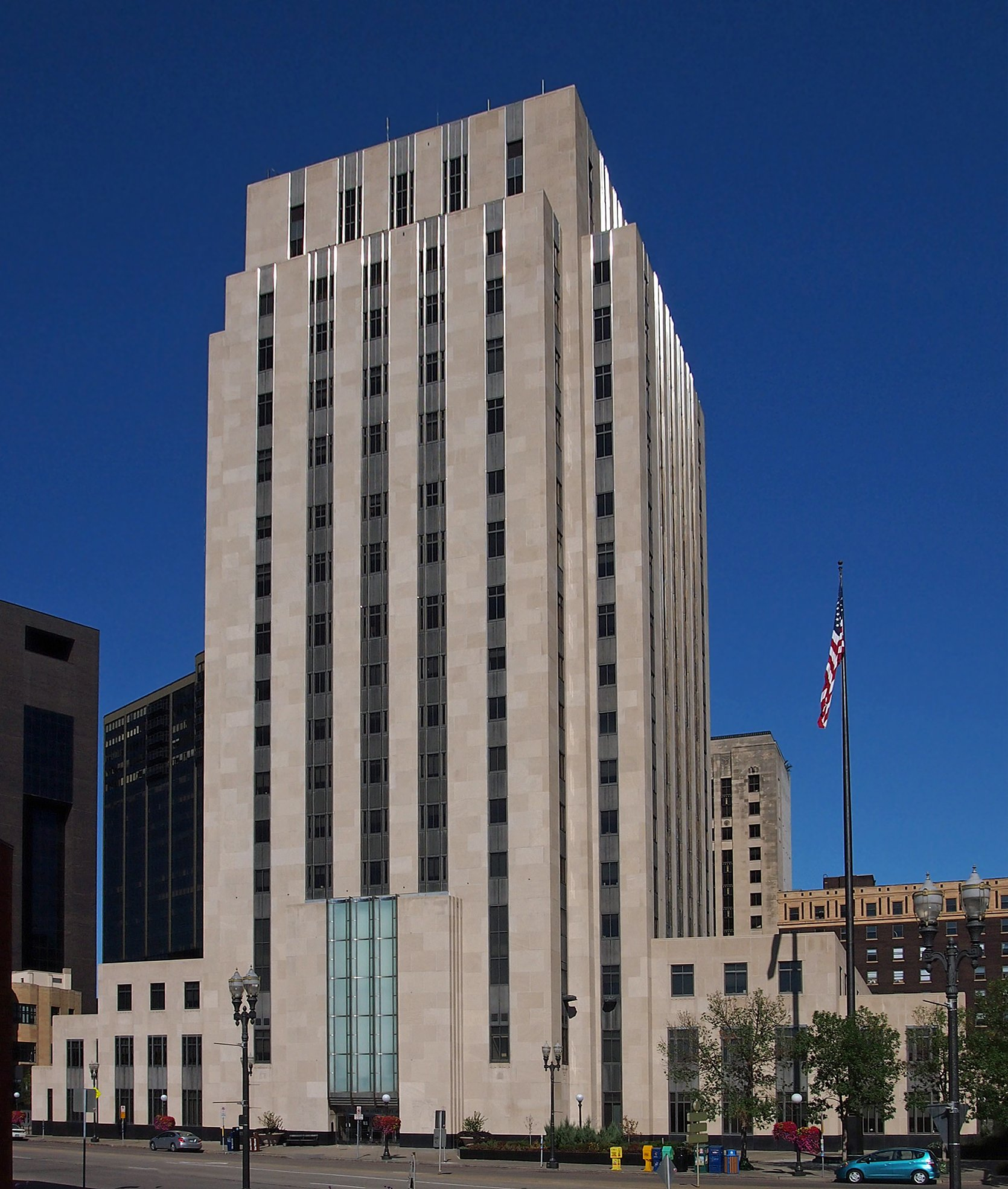
- Saint Paul City Hall and Ramsey County Courthouse

Website
- https://www.stpaul.gov/

The Saint Paul City Council is the governing body of Saint Paul, Minnesota, United States, as part of a strong mayor–council government. It has seven members from seven wards, each elected to four-year terms. As of 2024, all seven are members of the Minnesota Democratic–Farmer–Labor Party, although city elected official positions are nonpartisan according to state law, and political party identifications are not included on election ballots.

As of February 2023, council members earn $70.28 per hour. They are classified as part-time employees and are compensated for 40 hours per pay period (about $73,000 annually).

== History ==
St. Paul has used the single transferable vote system, a form of ranked voting, since 2011, after voters approved it in 2009. The city council has single-member districts, so the single transferable vote functions the same way as instant-runoff voting.

=== Demographics ===
One hundred and two years after its incorporation in 1854, the city elected Elizabeth DeCourcy as its first female council member in 1956. DeCourcy served three two-year terms. In 2004, Debbie Montgomery made history as the first woman of color on the council, representing Ward 1. Before her political career, she had been the city's first female police officer. She served one term on the council. Dai Thao, elected in 2013, was the first Hmong American council member, representing Ward 1 until he moved to Florida in 2022. Mitra Jalali's election in 2018 to represent Ward 4 marked several firsts: she was the first Asian American woman, the first openly LGBTQ+ member, and Minnesota's first Iranian American elected official. With Jalali's election, the council had a majority-female composition for the first time, with women holding four of the seven seats.

Nelsie Yang joined the council in 2020 as the first Hmong American woman and the youngest member ever at age 24, representing Ward 6.

In 2024, the council became the first in an American city of its size (over 300,000 residents) entirely composed of women, with six of the seven members women of color: Asian Americans Yang, Saura Jost, and Hwa Jeong Kim; Jalali, who is Asian American and Iranian; and African Americans Anika Bowie and Cheniqua Johnson. The Center for American Women and Politics at Rutgers University reports that women hold 32 percent of municipal offices nationwide.

=== Controversy over ceasefire resolution ===
On February 28, 2024, Nelsie Yang attempted to introduce a resolution calling for a ceasefire in the Israel-Hamas conflict. Before Yang could do so, Council President Jalali adjourned the meeting after approximately 50 minutes for unspecified reasons and asked Yang to connect with her later. After the adjournment, there were protests and dissatisfaction among the attendees, including pro-Palestinian demonstrators. Yang expressed frustration with the abrupt adjournment, calling it "undemocratic". She also voiced disappointment in her colleagues' unwillingness to support the resolution despite their agreement with it. The incident prompted discussions about democracy, public leadership, and the role of elected officials in addressing global issues at the local level.

== Membership ==
The council has seven members. Council positions are nonpartisan. The newest member, Molly Coleman, took office in August 2025.

Ward	Name	Party	Further affiliations	Neighborhoods
1	Anika Bowie	DFL		Frogtown, Summit-University, North End, Lexington-Hamline, Snelling-Hamline
2	Rebecca Noecker	DFL		West 7th Street, West Side, Summit Hill, Railroad Island, Lowertown, Downtown
3	Saura Jost	DFL		Highland Park, Macalester-Groveland
4	Molly Coleman	DFL		Hamline-Midway Merriam Park, Saint Anthony Park, Macalester-Groveland, Como
5	HwaJeong Kim	DFL	DSA	Como, North End, Payne-Phalen, Railroad Island
6	Nelsie Yang	DFL	DSA	Greater East Side (Frost Lake, Hayden Heights, Hazel Park, Phalen Village, Prosperity), Payne-Phalen
7	Cheniqua Johnson	DFL		Dayton's Bluff, Mounds Park, Swede Hollow, Southeast (Battle Creek, Highwood, Conway, Eastview)

== Elections ==
- 2015 Saint Paul City Council election
