= James Scheibel =

American politician

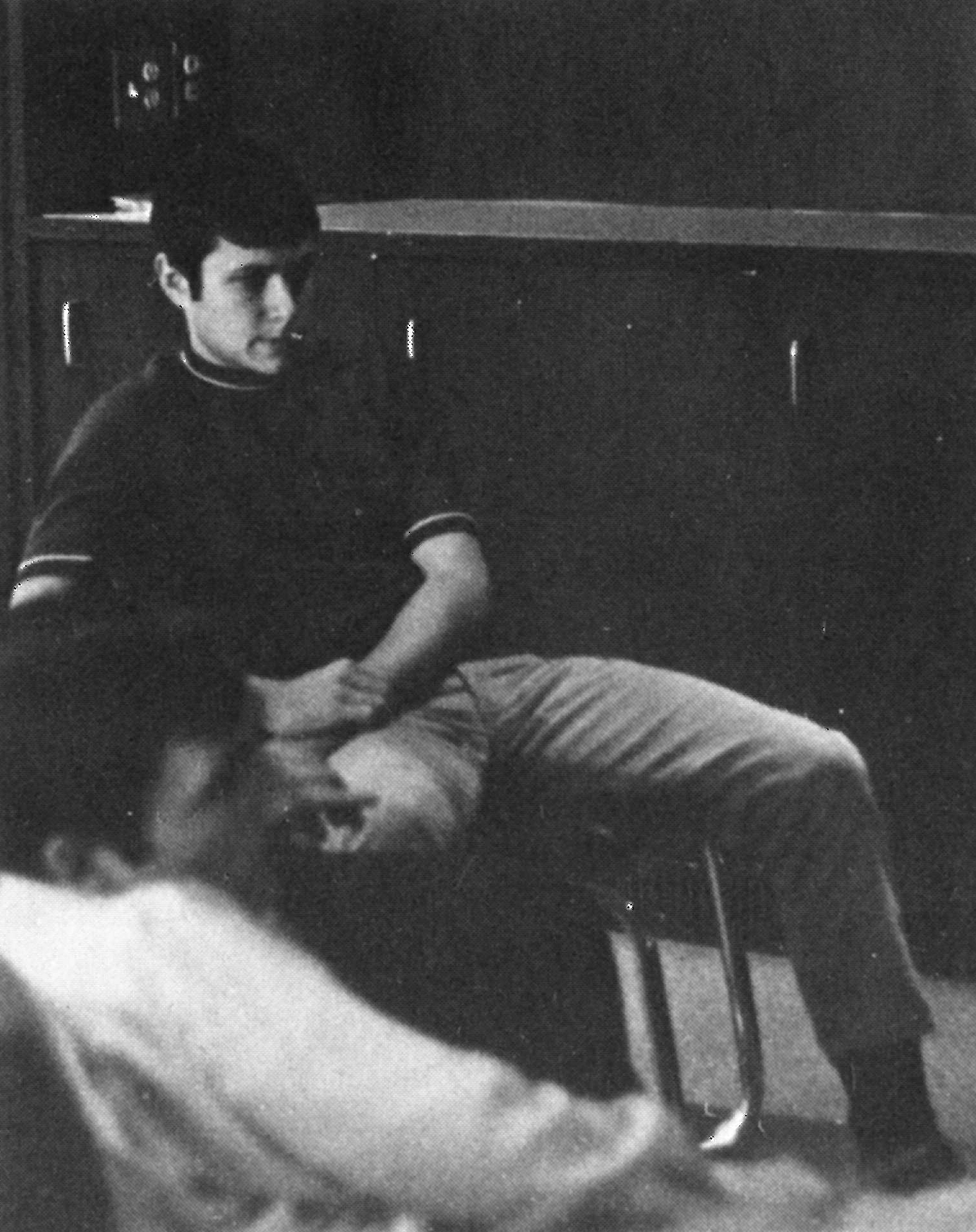
Scheibel in the Saint John's University yearbook, 1969

James A. Scheibel (born August 30, 1947) is an American politician who served from 1990 to 1994 as the mayor of Saint Paul, Minnesota. A member of the Minnesota Democratic-Farmer-Labor Party, he was also one of the only candidates endorsed by the Democratic Socialists of America who was elected to office before the late 2010s. His was preceded as mayor by George Latimer and succeeded by Norm Coleman.

== Education ==
A graduate of Saint John's University (B.A., 1969), he worked as a community organizer, as aide to former mayor Lawrence D. Cohen, as national organizer for Fred R. Harris's 1976 presidential campaign, and as deputy director for Volunteers in Service to America (VISTA). Elected to the Saint Paul City Council in 1982, he served there until his election as mayor.

== Mayor of Saint Paul ==
As mayor, Scheibel focused on addressing homelessness, hunger, and refugee services.

== Post-mayoralty ==
After his mayoralty, Scheibel served as vice president for the Corporation for National and Community Service and as a nonprofit executive. He chaired the 21st Century Democrats, a progressive electoral coalition that was active within the national Democratic Party. He is also a member of the Saint Paul Area Council of Churches. He teaches at Hamline University and is the interim executive director of the Minnesota Campus Compact. Scheibel was recently appointed president of AARP Minnesota, which has more than 650,000 members. He was instrumental in the launch of AmeriCorps.

== Personal life ==
In 1987, Scheibel, then a Saint Paul City Council member, ran the Twin Cities Marathon in 2 hours and 45 minutes.

== See also ==
- List of Democratic Socialists of America who have held office in the United States

Political offices
Preceded by George Latimer	Mayor of St. Paul; 1990 – 1994	Succeeded by Norm Coleman
