= Hjalmar Petersen =

American politician (1890–1968)

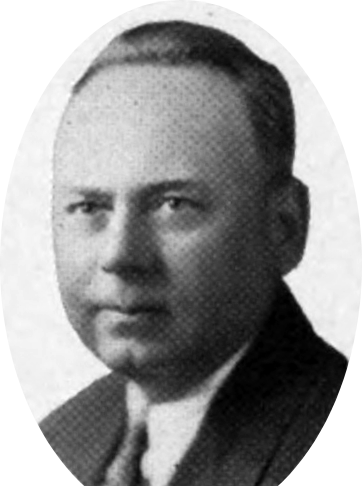
- Petersen c. 1935

23rd Governor of Minnesota
- In office August 22, 1936 – January 4, 1937
- Lieutenant: William B. Richardson (acting)
- Preceded by: Floyd B. Olson
- Succeeded by: Elmer Austin Benson

28th Lieutenant Governor of Minnesota
- In office January 8, 1935 – August 24, 1936
- Governor: Floyd B. Olson
- Preceded by: Konrad K. Solberg
- Succeeded by: William B. Richardson

Member of the Minnesota House of Representatives from the 56th district
- In office January 5, 1931 – January 6, 1935

Personal details
- Born: January 2, 1890 Eskildstrup, Denmark
- Died: March 29, 1968 (aged 78) Columbus, Ohio, U.S
- Resting place: Askov, Minnesota, U.S
- Party: Farmer-Labor
- Other political affiliations: Republican (1946); Democratic–Farmer–Labor (after 1950)
- Spouse(s): Rigmor C. Wosgaard (1st), Medora Grandprey (2nd)
- Profession: Journalist, politician

Hjalmar Petersen (January 2, 1890 – March 29, 1968) was an American journalist and politician who served as the 23rd governor of Minnesota from 1936 to 1937, succeeding the late Floyd Olson. In office for just 136 days, he became the shortest-serving governor of Minnesota, beating the previous record holder, Henry Adoniram Swift.

== Background ==
Hjalmar Petersen was born in Eskildstrup, Denmark, to Lauritz and Anna Petersen, who moved with Hjalmar to Chicago, Illinois, shortly after his birth. They later moved to the Danebod in Tyler, Minnesota. Petersen attended school until the seventh grade. His career in journalism, which had begun in 1904, culminated in his purchase in 1914 of the Askov American in Askov, Minnesota, a weekly newspaper he owned for the rest of his life.

== Political career ==
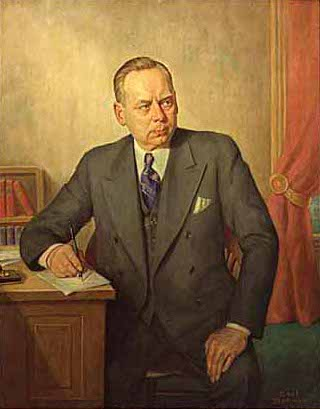
Portrait of Petersen as Governor

After serving as Askov's village clerk and mayor, Petersen won two terms in the Minnesota House of Representatives, where he sponsored the state income-tax law and urged that tax revenues be spent on public education. Before he ran for the Minnesota Legislature he had been a member of the Republican Party. By the time he ran for office he was a member of the Farmer-Labor Party. He served in the legislature from 1931 to 1934, representing the old House District 56.

Petersen was elected the 28th Lieutenant Governor of Minnesota in 1934 and served with Governor Floyd B. Olson. He was sworn in as governor two days after Olson died of cancer on August 22, 1936. He served the remainder of Olson's term but declined to run for governor himself in the November general election, opting instead to launch a successful bid for Railroad and Warehouse Commissioner, a position he then assumed after leaving the governorship on January 4, 1937. Petersen was succeeded as governor by Elmer Benson, a Farmer-Laborite from a more radical wing then Petersen. In 1938, Petersen ran against Benson in the primary. Petersen was unsuccessful in winning the nomination, but was successful in splitting the party along factional lines.

He later ran for governor in 1940 and 1942, losing both times to Harold Stassen.

Despite being a supporter of Franklin D. Roosevelt, Petersen opposed his bid for a third term in 1940, believing he should sabotage his own chances at winning by breaking the two-term precedent.

== Personal life ==
After his term as governor, he served as the president of the American Publishing Company. He was married twice, first to Rigmor C. Wosgaard in 1914 and later to Medora Grandprey in 1934. He died in 1968 in Columbus, Ohio.

== See also ==
- List of United States governors born outside the United States

== Sources ==
- The Hjalmar Petersen Papers are available for research use at the Minnesota Historical Society.

Party political offices
Preceded by Konrad K. Solberg	Farmer–Labor nominee for Lieutenant Governor of Minnesota; 1934	Succeeded by Gottfrid Lindsten
Preceded by Elmer Austin Benson	Farmer–Labor nominee for Governor of Minnesota; 1940, 1942	Succeeded by Byron G. Allen; Democratic–Farmer–Labor
Political offices
Preceded by Konrad K. Solberg	Lieutenant Governor of Minnesota; 1935–1936	Succeeded by William B. Richardson; Acting Lieutenant Governor
Preceded by Floyd B. Olson	Governor of Minnesota; 1936–1937	Succeeded by Elmer Austin Benson
