= George Latimer (Minnesota politician) =

American politician (1935–2024)

49th Mayor of Saint Paul, Minnesota
- In office 1976–1990
- Preceded by: Lawrence D. Cohen
- Succeeded by: James Scheibel

58th President of the National League of Cities
- In office 1984
- Preceded by: Charles Royer
- Succeeded by: George Voinovich

Personal details
- Born: June 23, 1935 Schenectady, New York, U.S.
- Died: August 18, 2024 (aged 89) Saint Paul, Minnesota, U.S.
- Party: DFL

George Latimer (June 23, 1935 – August 18, 2024) was an American politician who served as mayor of Saint Paul, Minnesota, the state's capital city, from 1976 until 1990. A member of the DFL and a labor lawyer by profession, Latimer was known for his redevelopment of St. Paul's downtown core, serving as mayor during a period when St. Paul's population was declining as some residents moved to suburban areas while the city's ethnic diversity increased as, among others, Hmong refugees from Vietnam and Laos resettled in Saint Paul.

== Life and career ==
Latimer was born in Schenectady, New York. He attended Saint Michael's College and Columbia Law School and practiced law in Saint Paul from 1963 until he was elected mayor. Latimer was of Irish and Lebanese ancestry. In 1984, he served as president of the National League of Cities.

In 1986, Latimer unsuccessfully sought the DFL nomination for governor, losing the primary to incumbent Rudy Perpich. His running mate was Arvonne Fraser, wife of Minneapolis Mayor Donald M. Fraser. Perpich went on to win the general election.

In 1987, Latimer served as a selection committee member for the Rudy Bruner Award for Urban Excellence.

In 1987, Saint Paul Mayor George Latimer wore a tam o'shanter and awarded laurels to winners of the Twin Cities Marathon at the finish line.

After his mayoral tenure, he served as dean of Hamline University's law school from 1990 to 1993 and as a special adviser to Henry Cisneros, President Bill Clinton's Housing and Urban Development secretary, from 1993 to 1995.

An expert on urban affairs and urban development, Latimer has lectured on those topics as a visiting professor of Urban Studies and Geography at Macalester College in Saint Paul since 1996.

From January 1996 to January 1998, Latimer was CEO of the National Equity Fund, which manages approximately 27,000 housing units in 35 cities and provides affordable housing for working people through use of the Low-Income Housing Tax Credit.

Latimer was in the business world for several years, serving from 2001 as a director of Indentix Incorporated (formerly Visionics until a merger with Indentix in 2002). He served on the Harvard Kennedy School's Executive Session on Policy at Harvard University and as Regent of the University of Minnesota. He also worked part-time as a labor arbitrator. St Paul Central Library was renamed George Latimer Central Library in 2014 in his honor by then-mayor Chris Coleman.

Latimer was one of several people who delivered a eulogy at the public memorial service of U.S. Senator Paul Wellstone, held at the University of Minnesota and televised on local stations and C-SPAN.

In June 2022, Latimer was moved to a hospice, but was later discharged from their care. Latimer died at a retirement home in Saint Paul on August 18, 2024, at the age of 89.

Political offices
Preceded by Lawrence D. Cohen	Mayor of St. Paul; 1976–1990	Succeeded by James Scheibel
