= 2015 Saint Paul City Council election =

Local election in Minnesota, United States

Saint Paul City Council elections, 2015
- November 3, 2015

All 7 seats on the Saint Paul City Council 4 seats needed for a majority
Party	Democratic (DFL)	Green
Last election	7 seats	0 seats
Incumbent President
Kathy Lantry
Democratic (DFL)

The 2015 Saint Paul City Council elections was held on November 3, 2015, to elect the 7 members of the Saint Paul City Council for four-year terms. Members were elected from single-member districts via instant-runoff voting, popularly known as ranked choice voting.

Municipal elections in Minnesota are nonpartisan, although candidates were able to identify with a political party on the ballot.

== Results ==
Names of incumbents are italicized.

=== Ward 7 ===
==== Candidates ====
Jane Prince

== See also ==
- Saint Paul City Council
- Saint Paul mayoral election, 2013
