= James T. Maxfield =

American politician (1827–1878)

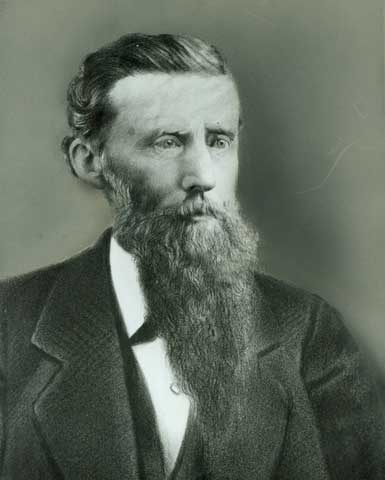
- Maxfield c. 1870

19th Mayor of Saint Paul, Minnesota
- In office 1875 – May 29, 1878
- Preceded by: Jacob H. Stewart
- Succeeded by: William Dawson

16th Mayor of Saint Paul, Minnesota
- In office 1869–1870
- Preceded by: Jacob H. Stewart
- Succeeded by: William Lee

Member of the Indiana General Assembly
- In office 1852–1853

Personal details
- Born: March 7, 1827 Norwich, Ohio, U.S.
- Died: May 29, 1878 (aged 51) Saint Paul, Minnesota, U.S.
- Resting place: Oakland Cemetery, Saint Paul, Minnesota, U.S.
- Party: Democratic
- Occupation: Politician

James T. Maxfield (March 7, 1827 – May 29, 1878) was an American politician who served as the 16th mayor of Saint Paul, Minnesota, from 1869 to 1870 and as the 19th mayor of Saint Paul from 1875 until his death in 1878. He previously served in the Indiana General Assembly from 1852 to 1853.

== Early life and education ==
Maxfield was born on March 7, 1827, in Norwich, Ohio, where he attended school until the age of 12 and lived until the age of 23. He then went to Goshen, Indiana, where he resided for eight years. Maxfield later moved to Detroit, then Cleveland, before becoming a resident of Saint Paul, Minnesota, in 1864.

== Career ==
Maxfield served in the Indiana General Assembly from 1852 to 1853.

Maxfield served as the 16th mayor of Saint Paul, Minnesota, from 1869 to 1870. He was re-elected to a second term in December 1874 and served as the 19th mayor of Saint Paul from 1875 to 1878. In total, Maxfield was elected to three terms as mayor.

During his first term as mayor, Maxfield crusaded for the closure of disorderly houses and saloons on Sundays after his administration received a petition signed by more than 1,000 residents. Additionally, the annual salary of the chief of police was increased to $1,200 during Maxfield's first term.

During a latter term as mayor, Maxfield suggested the immediate establishment of a municipal court, which the city council acted upon. During the latter part of his last term, Maxfield became seriously ill and Democrat William Dawson served as acting mayor. Dawson was subsequently elected to his own term as mayor following the expiration of Maxfield's term.

== Death ==
Maxfield died at the age of 51 in Saint Paul on May 29, 1878, becoming the first mayor of Saint Paul to die in office. He was interred at Oakland Cemetery in Saint Paul.

Political offices
Preceded by —	Member of the Indiana General Assembly; 1852–1853	Succeeded by —
Preceded by Jacob H. Stewart	Mayor of Saint Paul, Minnesota; 1869–1870	Succeeded by William Lee
Preceded by Jacob H. Stewart	Mayor of Saint Paul, Minnesota; 1875–1878	Succeeded by William Dawson
