= Mitra Jalali =

American politician (born 1986)

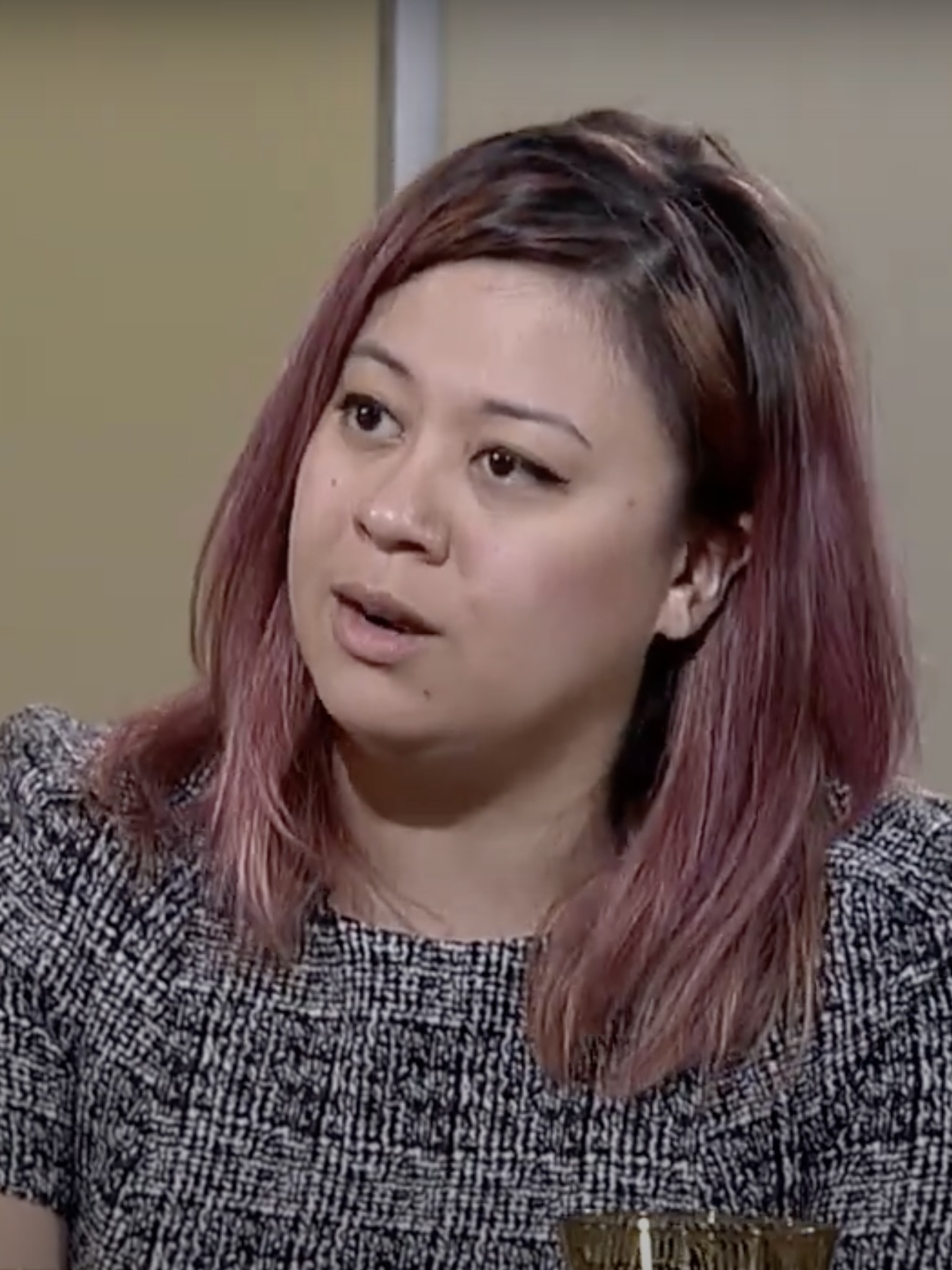

President of the Saint Paul City Council
- In office January 10, 2024 – February 5, 2025
- Preceded by: Amy Brendmoen
- Succeeded by: Rebecca Noecker

Member of the Saint Paul City Council from Ward 4
- In office 2019 – February 5, 2025
- Preceded by: Russ Stark

Personal details
- Born: 1986 (age 39–40) Minnesota
- Party: Democratic (DFL)

Mitra Jalali (born 1986) is a former City Council President and Council Member for Ward 4 in Saint Paul, Minnesota. She became the first Iranian-American elected official in Minnesota when she was elected to the Saint Paul City Council in 2018. In January 2025, Jalali announced her resignation from the city council effective February 5, 2025.

== Early life and career ==
Jalali was born to immigrant parents in Minnesota. Her father, Hossein Jalali, came to the U.S. from Iran as a high school exchange student in Rochester, Minnesota, in 1978, when he was 16 years old. Her mother was adopted from South Korea by a family in Owatonna, Minnesota. Her parents met in college.

Jalali's father organizes the annual Twin Cities Iranian Culture Festival.

After college, Jalali started her professional career as a teacher in New Orleans. After teaching, she worked as a community organizer and as a staffer to then U.S. Representative Keith Ellison.

== Elected office ==
Jalali became the first Iranian American to hold elected office in Minnesota in 2018 when she was elected to represent Ward 4 on the Saint Paul City Council in a special election after the previous representative resigned to accept a job in the mayor's office. She was the second woman of color to hold elected office in Saint Paul. She was also the first Asian American woman to serve on the council and the first to openly identify as part of the LGBTQ+ community. At the time she was first elected, she was the youngest council member and the only renter among the members.

Jalali was reelected to full four-year terms in 2019 and in 2023. After being sworn in on January 9, 2024, the council elected her council president at its first meeting on January 10. She identified the council's top three priorities as housing, sustainability and climate action, and community safety.

Jalali announced her resignation from city council in January 2025, citing concerns over her health. Her final council meeting was on February 5, 2025.

== City council president ==
=== Controversy over ceasefire resolution ===
On February 28, 2024, council member Nelsie Yang attempted to introduce a resolution calling for a ceasefire in the Israel-Hamas conflict. Before Yang could do so, Jalali adjourned the meeting after approximately 50 minutes for unspecified reasons and asked Yang to connect with her later. After the adjournment, there were protests and dissatisfaction among the attendees, including pro-Palestinian demonstrators. Yang expressed frustration with the abrupt adjournment, calling it "undemocratic". She also voiced disappointment in her colleagues' unwillingness to support the resolution despite their personal agreement with it. The incident prompted discussions about democracy, public leadership, and the role of elected officials in addressing global issues at the local level.
