= Gottfrid Lindsten =

American politician (1887–1961)

Gottfried Lindsten
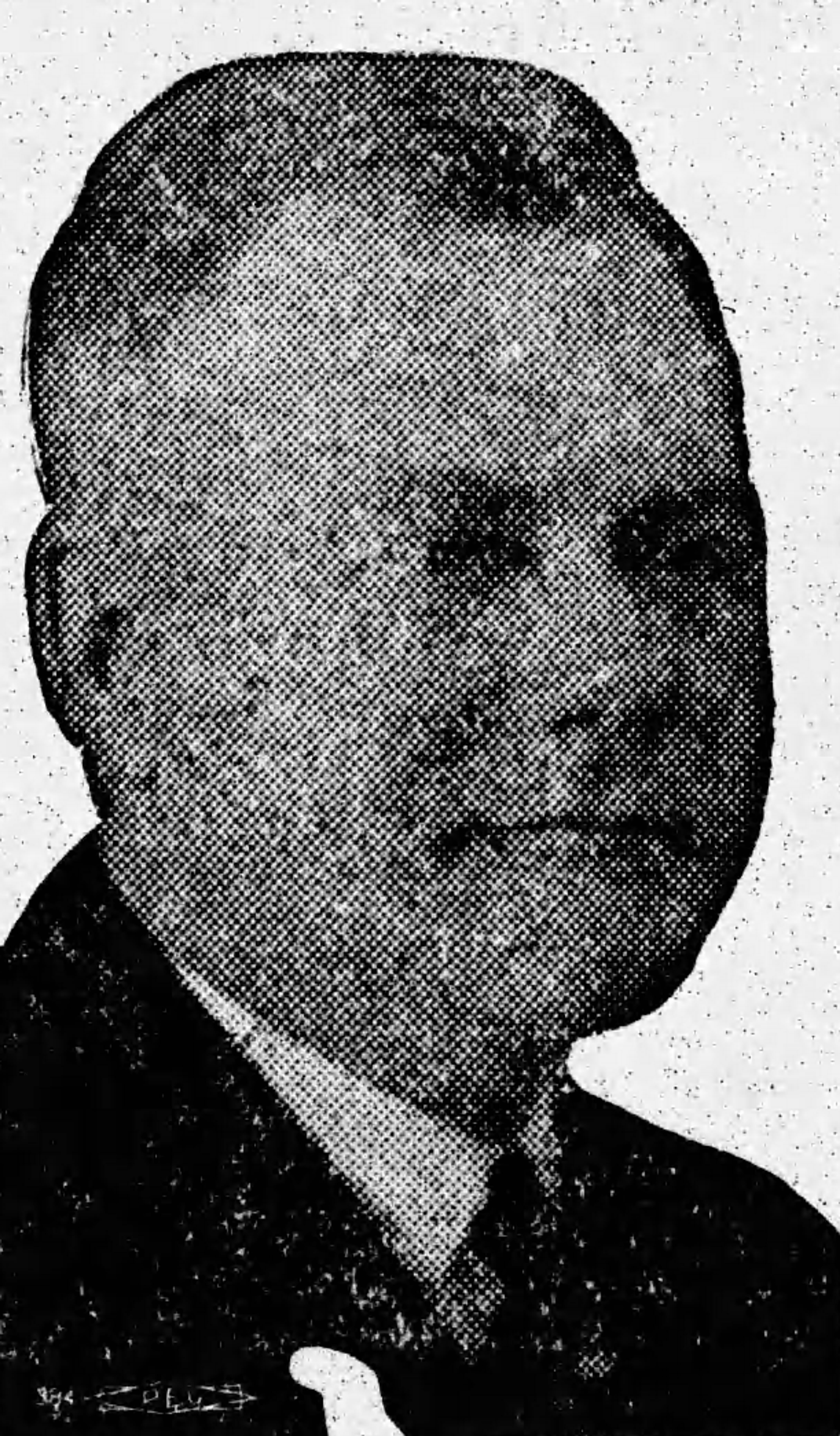
- Lindsten c. 1936

29th Lieutenant Governor of Minnesota
- In office January 4, 1937 – January 2, 1939
- Governor: Elmer Austin Benson
- Preceded by: William B. Richardson (acting)
- Succeeded by: C. Elmer Anderson

Personal details
- Born: June 27, 1887 Minneapolis, Minnesota, U.S.
- Died: June 2, 1961 (aged 73) Minneapolis, Minnesota, U.S.
- Party: Farmer-Labor
- Spouse: Pearle
- Profession: Alderman, lobbyist, railroad conductor

Gottfried T. Lindsten (June 27, 1887 – June 2, 1961) was the 29th lieutenant governor of Minnesota.

Lindsten was born in Minneapolis, Minnesota. He had been employed as a railroad conductor and later as an alderman and lobbyist. He became Lieutenant Governor under Governor Elmer Austin Benson serving from January 4, 1937 – January 2, 1939. He was an alternate delegate to the 1944 Democratic National Convention from Minnesota. He died in Minneapolis in 1961.

Party political offices
Preceded by Hjalmar Petersen	Farmer–Labor nominee for Lieutenant Governor of Minnesota; 1936	Succeeded by John J. Kinzer
Political offices
Preceded by William B. Richardson; Acting Lieutenant Governor	Lieutenant Governor of Minnesota; 1937–1939	Succeeded by C. Elmer Anderson
