= Minnesota Medical Association =

Association in Minnesota

Minnesota Medical Association (MMA) is a U.S. non-profit professional association representing physicians, residents, and medical students on healthcare issues at the Minnesota State Capitol and in Washington, D.C. It has 10,000 members.

== History ==
On July 23, 1853, John H. Murphy and 10 young physicians gathered at the new St. Paul courthouse for the first ever medical profession convention, where they formed the Minnesota Medical Society. The 11 physicians elected Thomas R. Potts, previously the first Mayor of St. Paul, Minnesota, as their president. John Murphy and A.E. Ames were made co-vice presidents.

In 2007, the MMA achieved its top public health priority with the passage of the Freedom to Breathe Act, which prohibits smoking in restaurants and bars in Minnesota.
