= William B. Richardson =

American politician (1874–1945)

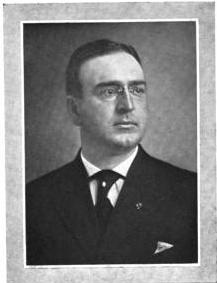

Member of the Minnesota Senate from the 4th district
- In office January 4, 1927 – September 19, 1945

Acting Lieutenant Governor of Minnesota
- In office August 24, 1936 – January 1, 1937
- Governor: Hjalmar Petersen
- Preceded by: Hjalmar Petersen
- Succeeded by: Gottfrid Lindsten

Mayor of Rochester, Minnesota
- In office 1911–1917
- Preceded by: J. C. Thompson
- Succeeded by: Julius Reiter

Personal details
- Born: William Burdette Richardson; November 10, 1874 Rochester, Minnesota
- Died: September 19, 1945 (aged 70) Rochester, Minnesota
- Party: Republican
- Profession: Lawyer; businessman; public official; legislator

William Burdette Richardson (November 10, 1874 – September 19, 1945) was a Republican Party Minnesota politician who served as Mayor of Rochester, Minnesota, and in the Minnesota Senate.

== Life and career ==
Richardson was born in Rochester, Minnesota in 1874. His father Henry M. Richardson was an early settler of Olmsted County, Minnesota and was involved in local and state Republican politics. His mother, Sarah McCrillis, was a native of Massachusetts. Richardson attended Rochester High School and later the University of Minnesota Law School, graduating in 1900. He went on to practice law in Rochester with his brother, Harold James Richardson, who was also a lawyer.

From 1911 to 1917 Richardson was the mayor of Rochester, Minnesota. He was later elected to the Minnesota State Senate in 1926 and re-elected a further five times through 1942. He served as Acting Lieutenant Governor from August 24, 1936 to January 1, 1937 when Governor Floyd B. Olson died and Lieutenant Governor Hjalmar Petersen became governor. While he was never formally sworn into office, as president pro tempore of the Minnesota Senate he was next in the line of succession. He also served as the acting president of the Minnesota Senate in 1937 as the Lieutenant Governor-elect Gottfrid Lindsten was unable to perform his duties due to illness.

Richardson died while in office on September 19, 1945. He is buried in Oakwood Cemetery in Rochester.

Political offices
Preceded by Hjalmar Petersen; Lieutenant Governor	Acting Lieutenant Governor of Minnesota; 1936–1937	Succeeded by Gottfrid Lindsten; Lieutenant Governor
Preceded by J. C. Thompson	Mayor of Rochester, Minnesota; 1911–1917	Succeeded by Julius J. Reiter
