= Wilber L. Paulson =

American businessman and politician

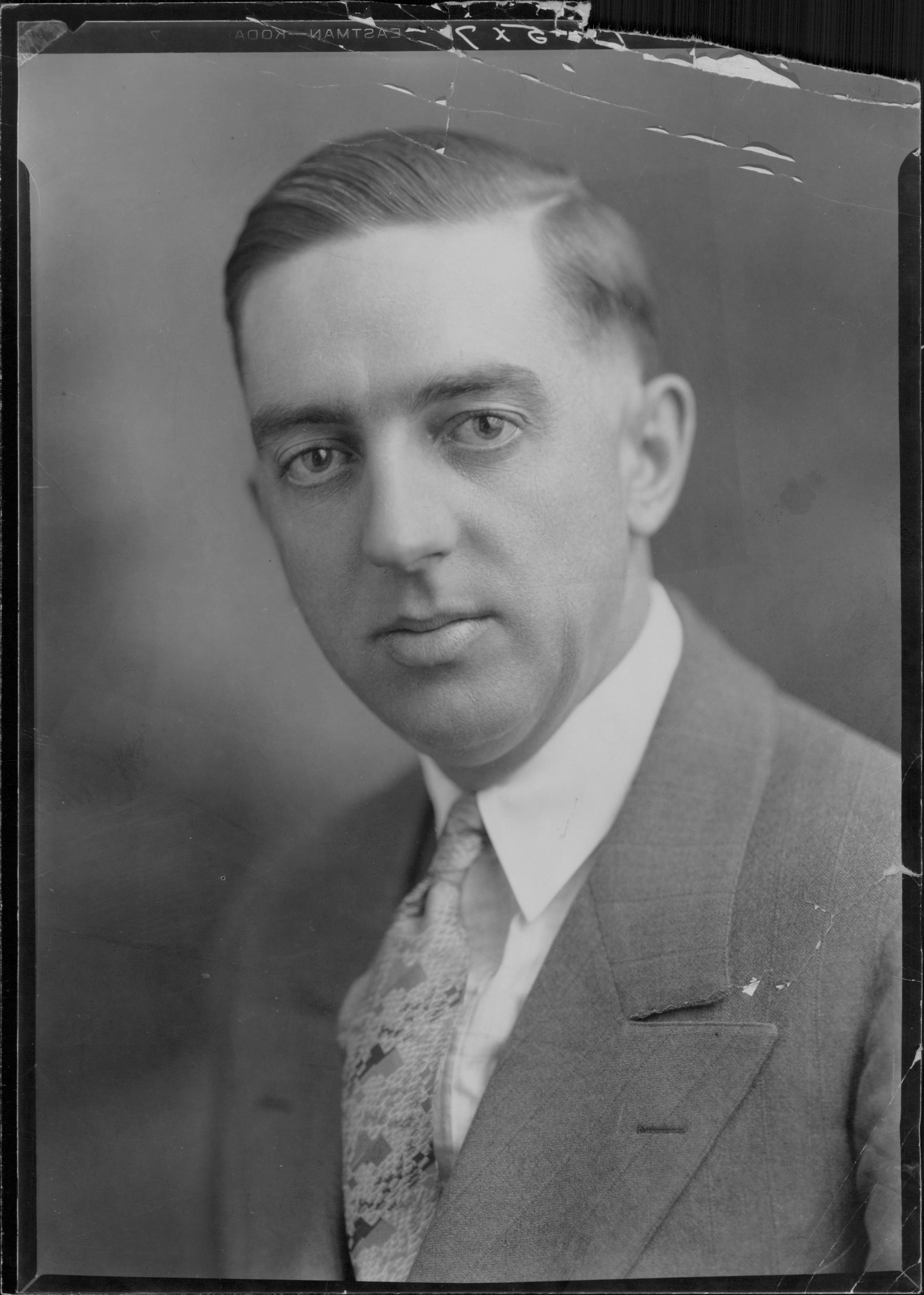
Paulson in 1926

Wilber L. Paulson (July 2, 1896 – January 24, 1954) was an American businessman and politician.

Paulsom was born in Minneapolis, Minnesota and went to the Minneapolis Public Schools. He served in the United States Army during World War I. Paulson went to the Minneapolis College of Law and was involved with the insurance business. Paulson served in the Minnesota House of Representatives in 1925 and 1926.
