= Robert Kennedy (St. Paul) =

American businessman (1801–1889)

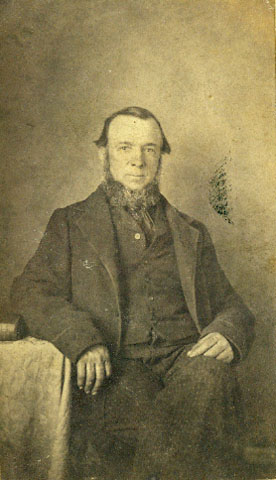
Kennedy in ~1860

Robert Kennedy (1801 – June 21, 1889) was an American hotel manager, businessman, and politician who served as the second town president of Saint Paul, Minnesota.

== Life and career ==
Kennedy was born in Virginia in 1801. He moved to Wisconsin in 1839 and from there to Minnesota in 1844, settling in the frontier town of Dakotah (today part of Stillwater, Minnesota). He ran a series of hotels in the Minnesota Territory's early towns before moving to Saint Paul, Minnesota in 1848 to run a hotel called the Central House. When the Minnesota Territory was formally organized in 1849, the territorial legislature's first meeting was held at his hotel. In 1851 he was elected the president of St. Paul's town board, serving one term. After serving as mayor, he went on to serve terms as the tax collector for the Port of St. Paul as well as the inspector of steamboats. Kennedy pursued several other business interests including a stagecoach line and a successful venture gold mining in Montana, but remained most well known for his heavy involvement in the hotel business. He died on June 21, 1889. He is buried in Oakland Cemetery in St. Paul.
