= Joseph E. Dillon =

American politician (1921–1990)

44th Mayor of Saint Paul
- In office 1954–1960
- Preceded by: John E. Daubney
- Succeeded by: George J. Vavoulis
- Constituency: Saint Paul, Minnesota

Personal details
- Born: March 18, 1921 Saint Paul, Minnesota, U.S.
- Died: April 17, 1990 (aged 69) Potomac, Maryland, U.S.
- Party: Democratic-Farmer-Labor
- Profession: Lawyer

Joseph E. Dillon (March 18, 1921 – April 17, 1990) was the mayor of Saint Paul, Minnesota from 1954 to 1960. During his tenure, in 1955, Saint Paul and Nagasaki became the first sister city pairing of an Asian city and an American city. A friend of Hubert Humphrey, Dillon campaigned for Humphrey during his 1960 presidential campaign.
