= Como Park, Saint Paul =

Neighborhood in Saint Paul, Minnesota

Coordinates: 44°58′45″N 93°08′41″W

Como Park is a neighborhood and city planning district in Saint Paul, Minnesota, in the United States. It is Planning District 10. The main features of the neighborhood are Como Lake and Como Park Zoo and Conservatory. The approximate boundaries of the neighborhood are Snelling Avenue to the west, Larpenteur Avenue to the north, Dale Street to the east, and the Pierce Butler Route to the south.

== History ==
The area around Como Lake was originally swamp and oak savannas. It was inhabited seasonally by the Dakota people, who called the lake Medawaka, which roughly translates to "Lake Mysterious." One of the earliest European settlers was Charles Perry. He farmed a 160-acre claim of land that later would become the regional park. Perry named the lake after Lake Como near his birthplace in the Swiss-Italian Alps.
