= Christopher D. O'Brien =

Irish-American lawyer and politician (1848–1922)

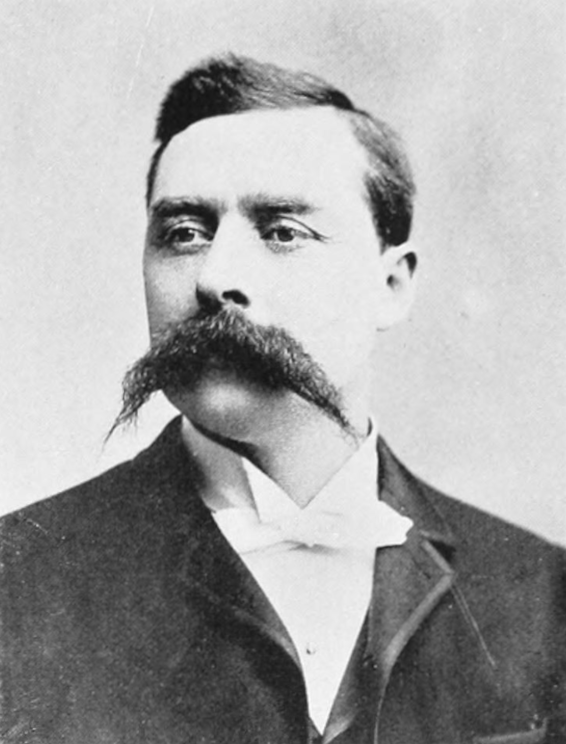

Mayor of Saint Paul, Minnesota
- In office 1883–1885

Personal details
- Born: Christopher Dillon O'Brien; December 4, 1848 County Galway, Ireland
- Died: August 27, 1922 (aged 73) Saint Paul, Minnesota, U.S.
- Party: Democratic
- Spouse: Susan E. Slater (m. 1872)
- Children: 8
- Occupation: Lawyer, politician

Christopher Dillon O'Brien (December 4, 1848 – August 27, 1922) was an Irish-American lawyer and politician.

== Biography ==
O'Brien was born to a Catholic family in County Galway, Ireland, December 4, 1848. His father, novelist Dillon O'Brien (1817–1882), emigrated to the US, working as a teacher among Native Americans in the Wisconsin town of La Pointe, on Madeline Island before settling his family in St Paul, Minnesota in 1863 to work with Archbishop John Ireland, helping establish many Irish Catholic colonies in the state.

O'Brien passed the bar in 1870. He married Susan E. Slater in October 1872, and they had eight children.

A Democrat, he was elected county attorney of Ramsey County, Minnesota in 1874, and served as the mayor of Saint Paul from 1883 to 1885. O'Brien died at his home in Saint Paul on August 27, 1922.

== See also ==
- List of mayors of Saint Paul
