= Daubeny =

Daubeny may refer to:

- Charles Daubeny (1795–1867), English scientist
- Charles Daubeny (priest), archdeacon of Salisbury
- Baron Daubeny, a title
- Henry Daubeny, 1st Earl of Bridgewater
