= John E. Daubney =

American politician (1919–2003)

43rd Mayor of Saint Paul, Minnesota
- In office 1952–1954
- Preceded by: Edward K. Delaney
- Succeeded by: Joseph E. Dillon

Personal details
- Born: July 12, 1919; Saint Paul, Minnesota, U.S.
- Died: August 6, 2003 (aged 84); Saint Paul, Minnesota, U.S.
- Political party: Republican
- Profession: Politician

John E. Daubney (July 12, 1919 – August 6, 2003) was an Irish Catholic mayor of St. Paul, Minnesota, 1952-1954.
