= Freedom to Breathe Act =

Minnesota legislation act that restricts smoking tobacco products in public places

The Freedom to Breathe Act of 2007 is a piece of Minnesota legislation that restricts the act of smoking tobacco products in public places. It amends sections of Minnesota Clean Indoor Air Act (MCIAA) of 1975.

== Passage and enactment ==
The earliest smoking ban in Minnesota was the Minnesota Clean Indoor Air Act (MCIAA), which took effect in 1975. The purpose of this act was to enforce the "protection of the public health." It prohibited smoking in areas where children, ill or injured are present. This first Minnesota act also limited smoking indoors at public places and private meetings.

Minnesota passed the Freedom to Breathe Act on May 16, 2007. This act was passed with the intent of protecting the public from health hazards of secondhand smoke by banning smoking in public indoor areas not covered by the 1975 law. An indoor area is defined as the space between a floor and a ceiling that is bounded by walls covering more than 50 percent of the perimeter of the area. Temporary physical barriers are considered walls, but certain window screens are not. The ban took effect October 1, 2007. Minnesota is the 17th state to enforce a statewide smoking ban. The original and major supporters of the 1975 regulations were very pleased to see the Freedom to Breathe Act pass through legislation and signed into law.

== Criticism ==
In an inForum online article, Don Davis quoted several House Republicans against the bill. Representative Bud Heidgerken (R-Freeport) said that the ban will hurt small enterprises and presented a kink in the State's plan. He stated, "You are going to vote them out of business tonight." Likewise, Dennis Ozment (R-Rosemount) stated that the passage of the bill is "tyranny, oppressive governmental power... This piece of legislation turned out to be just plain mean".

== Exemptions ==
Smoking is permitted in the following places:

- Specified rooms in residential health care facilities
- Separated, well-ventilated areas of locked psychiatric units
- Specified areas for use in peer-reviewed scientific studies related to smoking
- Private homes and residences when they are not in use as a place of employment
- Hotel and motel guest rooms
- Tobacco products shops for the purpose of sampling products
- Heavy commercial vehicles
- Farm vehicles and construction equipment
- Buildings on family farms
- Disabled veterans' rest camp
- Smoking is also permitted by Native Americans as part of a traditional Native American spiritual or cultural ceremony and by actors as part of a theatrical performance.
- Smoking outside, unless it is limited or prohibited by local government.

== See also ==
- Smoking
- List of smoking bans
- List of smoking bans in the United States
