= Franklin Ellsworth =

American politician

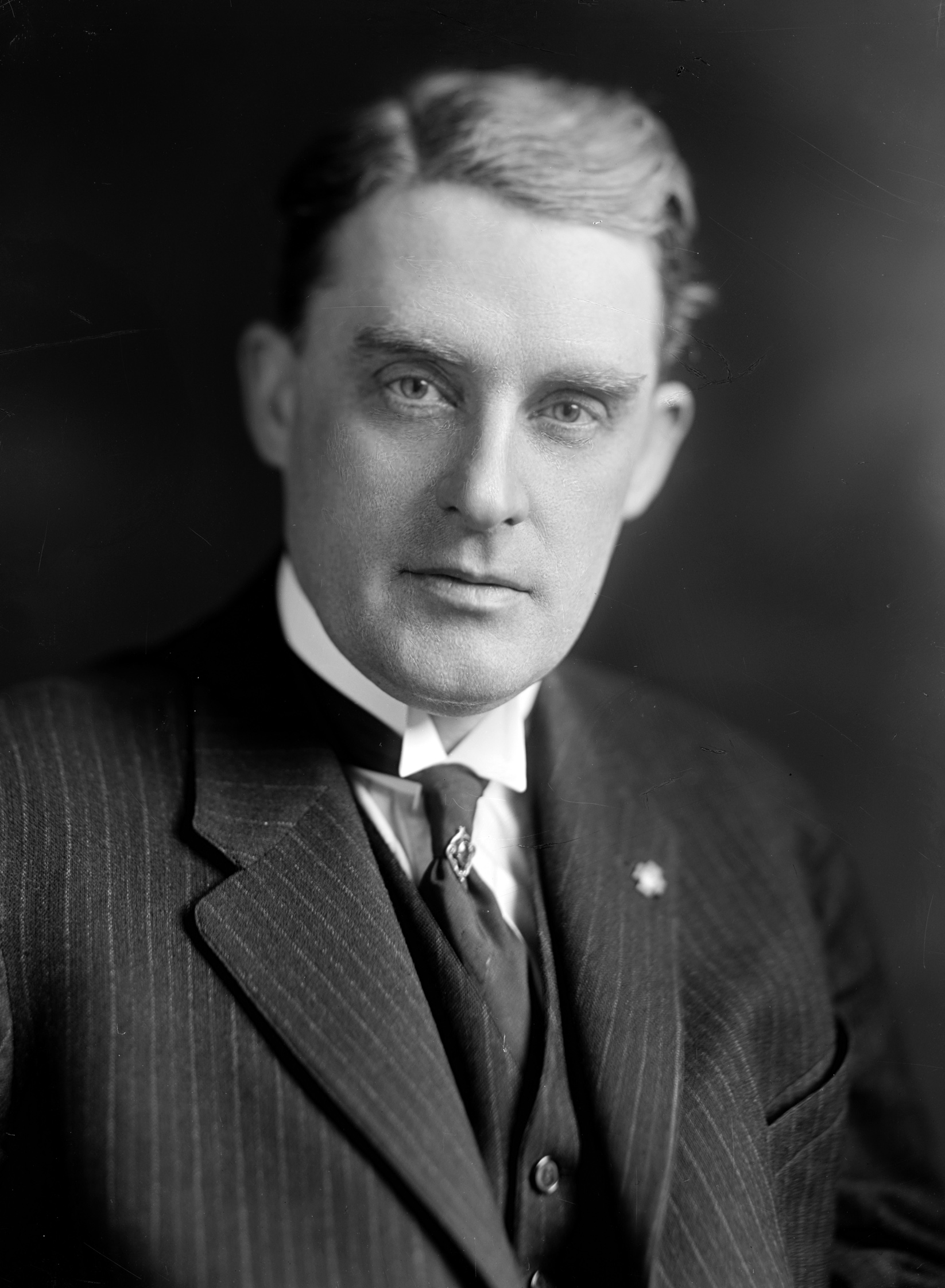

Member of the U.S. House of Representatives from Minnesota's 2nd district
- In office March 4, 1915 – March 3, 1921
- Preceded by: Winfield Scott Hammond
- Succeeded by: Frank Clague

Personal details
- Born: July 10, 1879 St. James, Minnesota, U.S.
- Died: December 23, 1942 (aged 63)
- Party: Republican

Franklin Fowler Ellsworth (July 10, 1879 – December 23, 1942) was an American politician who served as a United States representative from Minnesota; born in St. James, Watonwan County, Minnesota, July 10, 1879; attended the grade and high schools; enlisted as a private in Company H, Twelfth Regiment, Minnesota Volunteer Infantry, during the Spanish–American War; attended the law department of the University of Minnesota at Minneapolis; was admitted to the bar in 1901 and commenced practice in St. James; city attorney of St. James in 1904 and 1905; prosecuting attorney of Watonwan County 1905–1909; elected as a Republican to the 64th, 65th, and 66th congresses (March 4, 1915 – March 3, 1921); was not a candidate for renomination in 1920, having become a gubernatorial candidate; unsuccessful candidate for Governor of Minnesota in 1920 and 1924; moved to Minneapolis, Minnesota, in 1921 and resumed the practice of his profession; died in Minneapolis, December 23, 1942; interment in Lakewood Cemetery.

Party political offices
Preceded by Theodore G. Streissguth	Republican nominee for Lieutenant Governor of Minnesota; 1934	Succeeded by Arthur E. Nelson
U.S. House of Representatives
Preceded by Winfield Scott Hammond	U.S. Representative from Minnesota's 2nd congressional district 1915–1921	Succeeded by Frank Clague
