= Lawrence D. Cohen (politician) =

American judge and politician

Larry Cohen

Mayor of St. Paul
- In office 1972–1976
- Preceded by: Charles P. McCarty
- Succeeded by: George Latimer

Personal details
- Born: Lawrence D. Cohen; April 17, 1933 Saint Paul, Minnesota, U.S.
- Died: September 11, 2016 (aged 83)
- Education: University of Minnesota (LLB)

Lawrence D. "Larry" Cohen (April 17, 1933 – September 11, 2016) was an American attorney, politician, and judge who served as mayor of Saint Paul, Minnesota, from 1972 to 1976.

== Early life and education ==
Born in Saint Paul, Minnesota, Cohen graduated from the University of Minnesota Law School in 1957.

== Career ==
After graduating from law school, Cohen entered private practice as an attorney at law in Minnesota. He was elected to the Ramsey County, Minnesota Board of Commissioners in 1970 serving two years before being elected mayor of Saint Paul. Succeeded by George Latimer as mayor, Cohen returned to the private practice of law until appointed as a Minnesota state judge by Governor Rudy Perpich in 1988. Judge Cohen retired in 2002. He died on September 11, 2016, of cancer in Saint Paul, Minnesota.
