= 2013 Saint Paul mayoral election =

- November 5, 2013
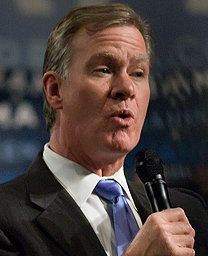

Candidate	Chris Coleman	Tim Holden
Party	Democratic (DFL)	Independent
Popular vote	23,875	4,978
Percentage	78.23%	16.31%
- Results by city council district Coleman: 70–80% 80–90%
Mayor before election
Chris Coleman
Democratic (DFL)
Elected Mayor
Chris Coleman
Democratic (DFL)

The 2013 Saint Paul mayoral election was held on November 5, 2013, to elect the mayor of Saint Paul, Minnesota for a four-year term. Incumbent Chris Coleman won re-election for a third term in the first round with 78.23% of the vote.

This was the first mayoral election in the city's history to use instant-runoff voting, popularly known as ranked choice voting, which was adopted by voters during the city's 2009 elections. Saint Paul did not hold a primary election on August 16, the 2013 date for primaries in Minnesota.

== Background ==
On April 3, 2013, incumbent Chris Coleman, who had been in office since 2006, announced that he would seek a third term as mayor. He was endorsed by the Saint Paul City DFL on June 10, 2013.

== Results ==
Saint Paul mayoral election, 2013
Candidate	% 1st choice	Round 1
Chris Coleman	78.23	23,875
Tim Holden	16.31	4,978
Sharon Anderson	3.00	917
Kurt (Dirty Kurty) Dornfeld	1.79	547
Write-in	0.66	201
Threshold: 15,260; Valid: 30,518
