= William Dawson (mayor) =

American politician (1825–1901)

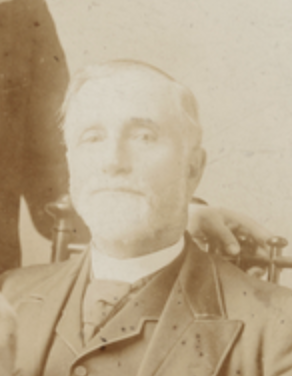

20th Mayor of Saint Paul, Minnesota
- In office 1878–1881
- Preceded by: James T. Maxfield
- Succeeded by: Edmund Rice

Personal details
- Born: October 1, 1825 County Cavan, Ireland
- Died: February 19, 1901 (aged 75) Saint Paul, Minnesota, U.S.
- Party: Democratic
- Profession: Politician

William Dawson (born in Ireland), was mayor of Saint Paul, Minnesota, United States, from 1878 to 1881. He was born in County Cavan, Ireland on October 1, 1825. He was a successful banker. When he was elected as mayor, he became the first mayor to be Irish in Saint Paul. He died on February 19, 1901. He died poor after his Bank of Minnesota failed five years before he died. There is a two-acre park named after him in Saint Paul. He is the namesake of the city of Dawson, Minnesota.
