= Edward K. Delaney =

American politician (1909–1973)

42nd Mayor of Saint Paul, Minnesota
- In office 1948–1952
- Preceded by: John J. McDonough
- Succeeded by: John E. Daubney

Personal details
- Born: August 12, 1909 Saint Paul, Minnesota, U.S.
- Died: October 2, 1973 (aged 64) Ramsey County, Minnesota, U.S.
- Resting place: Resurrection Cemetery
- Party: Democratic (DFL)
- Spouse: Gertrude
- Children: 8
- Occupation: Politician; judge

Edward K. Delaney (August 12, 1909 – October 2, 1973) was mayor of St. Paul, Minnesota from 1948 to 1952.

== Early life ==
Edward K. Delaney was born on August 12, 1909, in St. Paul, Minnesota. He was of Irish ancestry.

== Career ==
Delaney served as justice of the peace in the 1930s and 1940s. He was a Democrat. He ran for the 4th district seat in the U.S. House of Representatives in 1942, but lost to Melvin Maas. He served as mayor of St. Paul, Minnesota, from 1948 to 1952. He was a member of the board of commissioners of Ramsey County.

In 1965, Delaney was appointed by Governor Karl Rolvaag as municipal judge of St. Paul.

== Personal life ==
Delaney married Gertrude. They had four daughters and four sons, Alice, Gertrude "Trudy", Kathleen R., Elizabeth Ann, Edward K. Jr., Joseph T., Michael T., and Jerome "Jerry" T. He lived on Portland Avenue in St. Paul.

Delaney died following a stroke on October 2, 1973, aged 64, at St. Paul-Ramsey Hospital. He was buried at Resurrection Cemetery.
