= William H. Fallon =

American politician

William H. Fallon was an Irish Catholic mayor of St. Paul, Minnesota, United States, from 1938 to 1940. He was elected as an independent candidate in 1938 by a margin of 471 votes.
