= List of mayors of Saint Paul, Minnesota =

Mayor of St. Paul
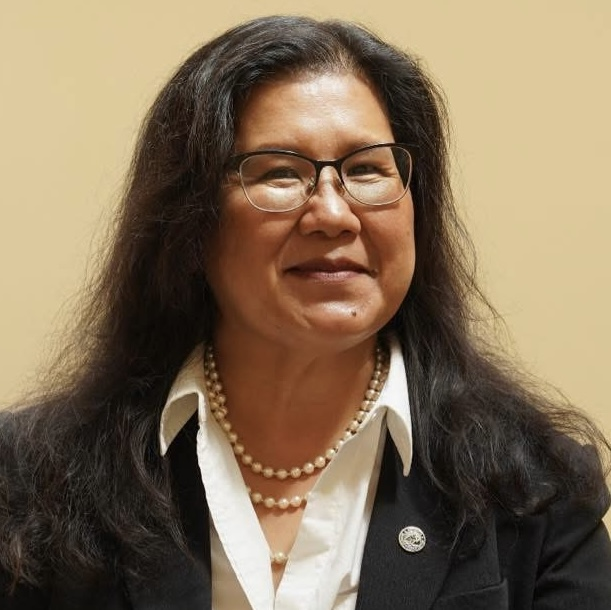
- Incumbent; Kaohly Her since January 2, 2026
- Seat: Saint Paul City Hall and Ramsey County Courthouse
- Term length: Four years, no term limit
- Formation: 1850
- First holder: Thomas R. Potts

This is a list of people who have served as mayor of Saint Paul, Minnesota.

No.	Image	Name	Term (elections)	Party
1		Thomas R. Potts	1850–1851	Independent
2		Robert Kennedy	1851–1852	Independent
3		Bushrod W. Lott	1852–1854	Democratic
4		David Olmsted	1854–1855	Democratic
5		Alexander Ramsey	1855–1856	Whig
6		George Loomis Becker	1856–1857	Democratic
7		John B. Brisbin	1857–1858	Democratic
8		Norman Wolfred Kittson	1858–1859	Democratic
9		Daniel A. Robertson	1859–1860	Democratic
10		John S. Prince	1860–1863	Democratic
11		John E. Warren	1863–1864	Democratic
12		Jacob H. Stewart	1864–1865	Republican
13		John S. Prince	1865–1867	Democratic
14		George L. Otis	1867–1868	Democratic
15		Jacob H. Stewart	1868–1869	Republican
16		James T. Maxfield	1869–1870	Democratic
17		William Lee	1870–1872	Democratic
18		Jacob H. Stewart	1872–1875	Republican
19		James T. Maxfield	1875–1878	Democratic
20		William Dawson	1878–1881	Democratic
21		Edmund Rice	1881–1883	Democratic
22		Christopher D. O'Brien	1883–1885	Democratic
23		Edmund Rice	1885–1887	Democratic
24		Robert A. Smith	1887–1892	Democratic
25		Frederick P. Wright	1892–1894	Republican
26		Robert A. Smith	1894–1896	Democratic
27		Frank Doran	1896–1898	Republican
28		Andrew Kiefer	1898–1900	Republican
29		Robert A. Smith	1900–1908	Democratic
30		Daniel W. Lawler	1908–1910	Democratic
31		Herbert P. Keller	1910–1914	Republican
32		Winn Powers	1914–1916	Democratic
33		Vivian R. Irvin	1916–1918	Republican
34		Laurence C. Hodgson	1918–1922	Democratic
35		Arthur E. Nelson	1922–1926	Republican
36		Laurence C. Hodgson	1926–1930	Democratic
37		Gerhard J. Bundlie	1930–1932	Independent
38		William Mahoney	1932–1934	Farmer-Labor
39		Mark H. Gehan	1934–1938	Independent
40		William H. Fallon	1938–1940	Independent
41		John J. McDonough	1940–1944	Democratic
41		John J. McDonough	1944–1948	Democratic–Farmer–Labor
42		Edward K. Delaney	1948–1952	Democratic–Farmer–Labor
43		John E. Daubney	1952–1954	Independent
44		Joseph E. Dillon	1954–1960	Democratic–Farmer–Labor
45		George J. Vavoulis	1960–1966	Independent
46		Thomas R. Byrne	1966–1970	Democratic–Farmer–Labor
47		Charles P. McCarty	1970–1972	Democratic–Farmer–Labor
48		Lawrence D. Cohen	1972–1976	Democratic–Farmer–Labor
49		George Latimer	1976–1990	Democratic–Farmer–Labor
50		James Scheibel	1990–1994	Democratic–Farmer–Labor
51		Norm Coleman	1994–1996	Democratic–Farmer–Labor
51		Norm Coleman	1996–2002	Republican
52		Randy Kelly	2002–2006 (2001)	Independent
53		Chris Coleman	2006–2018 (2005 • 2009 • 2013)	Democratic–Farmer–Labor
54		Melvin Carter III	2018–2026 (2017 • 2021)	Democratic–Farmer–Labor
55		Kaohly Her	2026– (2025)	Democratic–Farmer–Labor
