= 2025 Saint Paul mayoral election =

Local election in Minnesota, US

- November 4, 2025
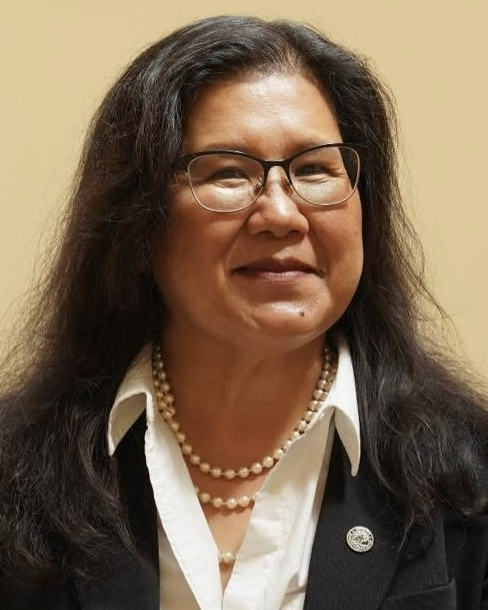

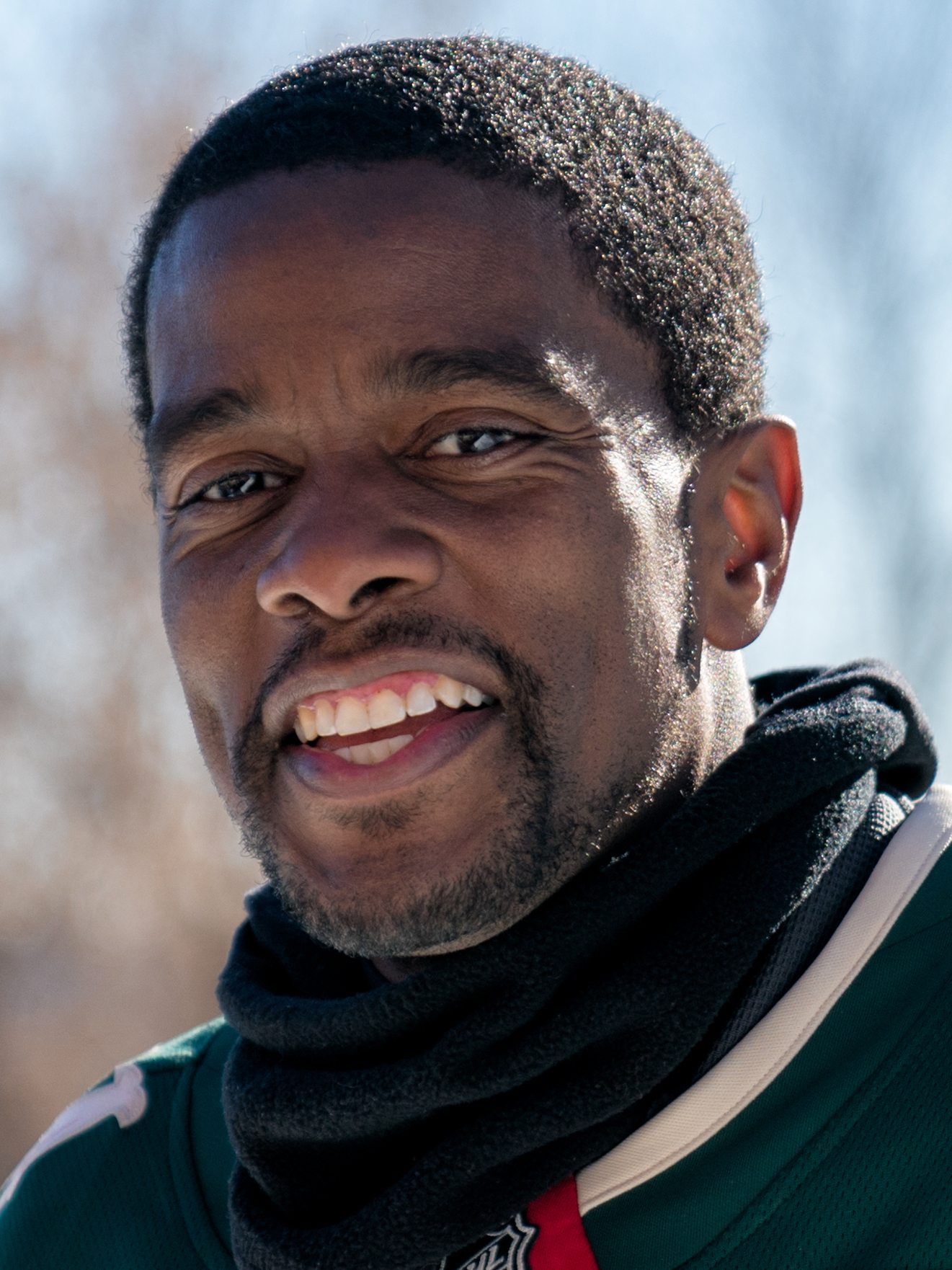
Candidate	Kaohly Her	Melvin Carter III
First round	25,884; 38.28%	27,611; 40.83%
Final round	32,295; 47.76%	30,418; 44.98%
Candidate	Yan Chen	Mike Hilborn
First round	6,416; 9.61%	5,701; 8.54%
Final round	Eliminated	Eliminated
- First preference votes by ward Her: 30–40% 40–50% 50–60% Carter: 30–40% 40–50% 50–60% 60–70% 80–90%
Mayor before election
Melvin Carter III
Democratic (DFL)
Elected mayor
Kaohly Vang Her
Democratic (DFL)

The city of Saint Paul, Minnesota held an election on November 4, 2025, to elect the mayor. It was held using ranked-choice voting. The city elects mayors to four-year terms without term limits. Incumbent mayor Melvin Carter III, first elected in 2017, lost reelection to State Representative Kaohly Vang Her. Both are members of the Democratic–Farmer–Labor Party.

Her was elected the first female, first Hmong, and first Asian-American mayor of Saint Paul. Her was elected in an upset after final round tabulations gave her an advantage distributed from other challengers to Carter, scientist Yan Chen, businessman Mike Hilborn, and engineer Adam Dullinger.

== Background ==
During the 2024 general election, voters approved a measure to move Saint Paul's city elections from odd-numbered years to even-numbered years to coincide with the state's general elections, beginning 2028. Thus, as it currently stands, this will be the last regularly scheduled Saint Paul mayoral election to be held during the off-year.

== Candidates ==
=== Declared ===
- Melvin Carter III, incumbent mayor (DFL)
- Yan Chen, scientist and 2023 Ward 1 city council candidate (DFL)
- Adam Dullinger, mechanical engineer (I)
- Kaohly Her, state representative from district 64A (DFL)
- Mike Hilborn, businessman and 2024 Republican state house candidate (I)

== Endorsements ==
Melvin Carter III (DFL)

Statewide officials

- Keith Ellison, Attorney General of Minnesota (2019–present)
- Peggy Flanagan, Lieutenant Governor of Minnesota (2019–present)
- Tim Walz, Governor of Minnesota (2019–present)

U.S. senators

- Amy Klobuchar, U.S. senator from Minnesota (2007–present)
- Tina Smith, U.S. senator from Minnesota (2018–present)

State legislators

- Samakab Hussein, state representative from district 65A (2023–present)
- Clare Oumou Verbeten, state senator from the 66th district (2023–present)
- Sandy Pappas, state senator from the 65th district (1991–present)

Municipal officials

- Garrison McMurtrey, Ramsey County Commissioner from the 3rd district (2025–present)
- Rena Moran, Ramsey County Commissioner from the 4th district (2023–present) and former state representative from district 65A (2011–2023)

Saint Paul city councilors

- Anika Bowie, Ward 1 (2024–present)
- Molly Coleman, Ward 4 (2025–present)
- Cheniqua Johnson, Ward 7 (2024–present)
- Saura Jost, Ward 3 (2024–present)

Individuals

- Naomi Kritzer, speculative fiction writer and blogger

Labor unions

- American Federation of Teachers Local 28
- International Brotherhood of Electrical Workers Local 110
- International Union of Painters and Allied Trades District Council 82
- Minnesota Nurses Association
- North Central States Regional Council of Carpenters
- Service Employees International Union Minnesota State Council
- United Association Locals 34, 417, and 455

Organizations

- Sierra Club North Star Chapter
Kaohly Her (DFL)

State legislators

- John Hoffman, state senator from the 34th district (2013–present)
- Zack Stephenson, DFL Caucus Leader of the Minnesota House of Representatives (2025–present) from district 35A (2019–present)
- Ryan Winkler, former Majority Leader of the Minnesota House of Representatives (2019–2023) from district 46A (2007–2015, 2019–2023)

Saint Paul city councilors

- Nelsie Yang, Ward 6 (2020–present)

Labor unions

- International Association of Fire Fighters Local 21
- International Association of Sheet Metal, Air, Rail and Transportation Workers Local 10
- International Brotherhood of Teamsters Joint Council #32

Organizations

- Everytown for Gun Safety
- New American Leaders Action Fund
- Saint Paul Association of Realtors
Declined to endorse

Municipal officials

- Steve Wellington, former Twin Cities Metropolitan Councilor (1993–1999)

Organizations

- Saint Paul Area Chamber of Commerce PAC

Party chapters

- Saint Paul Democratic–Farmer–Labor Party
- Saint Paul Republican Party

== Results ==
2025 Saint Paul mayoral election
Candidate	Round 1		Round 2	
Candidate	Votes	%	Votes	%
Kaohly Her	25,884	38.28	32,295	47.76
Melvin Carter III (incumbent)	27,611	40.83	30,418	44.99
Yan Chen	6,522	9.64	Eliminated	
Mike Hilborn	5,815	8.59	Eliminated	
Adam Dullinger	1,619	2.39	Eliminated	
Write-ins	166	0.24	Eliminated	
Exhausted ballots	—N/a		4,904	7.25
Total	67,617	100.0%	62,713	100.0%
