= 2025 in Minnesota =

- Decades: 2000s; 2010s; 2020s
- See also: History of Minnesota; Historical outline of Minnesota; List of years in Minnesota; 2025 in the United States

The following is a list of events of the year 2025 in Minnesota.

== Incumbents ==
=== State government ===
- Governor: Tim Walz (D)
- Lieutenant Governor: Peggy Flanagan (DFL)

== Events ==
=== January ===
- January 28 – 2025 Minnesota House of Representatives District 40B special election

=== March ===
- March 17 – State Representative Justin Eichorn is arrested for allegedly soliciting a minor for sex. He resigns three days later.
- March 29 – A SOCATA TBM-700 crashes into an unoccupied house in Brooklyn Park, killing everyone on board.

=== April ===
- April 28 – Rochester racial slur video incident
- April 29 – Five people are shot in a vehicle in Minneapolis, four fatally. Police say the shooting is gang-related, and a member of the Native Mob is arrested.

=== May ===
- May 21 – The Justice Department moves to cancel a consent decree with the Minneapolis Police Department.
- May 26 – The Minnesota Frost win the 2025 PWHL Finals, beating the Ottawa Charge 2–1 in game 4.

=== June ===
- June 14 – State Senator John Hoffman and State Representative Melissa Hortman and their spouses are shot in their respective homes in Champlin and Brooklyn Park by a gunman impersonating a police officer. Hortman and her husband are killed.

=== July ===
- July 18 – State Senator Nicole Mitchell is found guilty of burglary. In April 2024, Mitchell broke into her estranged stepmother's home to retrieve belongings owned by her late father. A few days after the ruling, Mitchell announces she will resign from her office.
- July 25 – The city of Saint Paul is affected by a cyberattack.

=== August ===
- August 26 – One person is killed and six others are wounded in a mass shooting near Cristo Rey Jesuit High School in Minneapolis.
- August 27 – 20 people are shot at a church during a Christian school's mass in Minneapolis. Two children are killed. The shooter commits suicide at the scene.

=== September ===
- September 15 – Five people are wounded in a mass shooting at a homeless encampment near the I-35W & Lake Street Metro station in Minneapolis, one of whom later dies from his injuries. Later that same day, seven people are injured in a shooting at another homeless encampment in the city, including one woman who later dies of her injuries. A drug dealer from Illinois is later charged in the second shooting.
- September 16 – Democrat Xp Lee wins special election to the Minnesota House in District 34B, taking the seat of Melissa Hortman, who was killed earlier in the year.

=== November ===
- November 4 –
  - 2025 Minneapolis municipal election
  - 2025 Minneapolis mayoral election: Incumbent Jacob Frey wins reelection, beating State Senator Omar Fateh.
  - 2025 Saint Paul mayoral election: State Representative Kaohly Her wins the mayoral race, beating incumbent mayor Melvin Carter. She is the first woman and Hmong American to serve as mayor of Saint Paul.
- November 21 – President Trump says the government will immediately strip all Somali immigrants in Minnesota of Temporary Protected Status. A study in August previous found there were 705 Somali people covered by TPS nationwide.

=== December ===
- December 3 – ICE begins increased immigration enforcement operations in Minneapolis.
- December 10 – The Mayo Clinic closes a clinic in St. Peter. The clinic is one of six shut down by the Mayo Clinic in December.
- December 19 – A jury awards $65.5 million to a woman who claimed Johnson & Johnson talcum products contaminated with asbestos caused her to develop mesothelioma.
- December 29 – Federal authorities increase operations in Minneapolis following a viral video alleging to have discovered fraud at Somali-run daycare centers.
- December 30 – The Department of Health and Human Services freezes all childcare funding to the state of Minnesota.

== See also ==
- 2025 in the United States
