= 2027 in Minnesota =

- Decades: 2000s; 2010s; 2020s
- See also: History of Minnesota; Historical outline of Minnesota; List of years in Minnesota; 2027 in the United States

The following is a list of events of the year 2027 in Minnesota.

== Incumbents ==
=== State government ===
- Governor: Tim Walz (DFL) until January 4; Amy Klobuchar (DFL) from January 4
- Lieutenant Governor: Peggy Flanagan (DFL) until January 4; Ben Schierer (DFL) from January 4

== Events ==
=== Predicted and scheduled ===
- November 2 – 2027 United States Senate special election in Minnesota

== See also ==
- 2027 in the United States
