= 2021 in Minnesota =

- Decades: 2000s; 2010s; 2020s
- See also: History of Minnesota; Historical outline of Minnesota; List of years in Minnesota; 2021 in the United States

The following is a list of events of the year 2021 in Minnesota.

== Incumbents ==
- Governor: Tim Walz (D)
- Lieutenant Governor: Peggy Flanagan (DFL)

== Events ==
- February 9 – A mass shooting at the Allina Clinic Crossroads in Buffalo, Minnesota kills one person and injures four others, prompting statewide mourning and a flag-lowering order.
- March 12 – The Minneapolis City Council approves a $27 million civil settlement with George Floyd's family.
- April 11 – Daunte Wright, a 20-year-old Black man, is fatally shot in Brooklyn Center by police officer Kimberly Potter.
- April 20 – Derek Chauvin is found guilty on all three counts in the murder of George Floyd, prompting large gatherings in Minneapolis and across Minnesota.
- May 14 – Governor Walz lifts the statewide mask mandate.
- May 25 – First anniversary of George Floyd's murder, with official commemorations and a statewide moment of silence ordered by Governor Walz.
- June 3 – Law enforcement fatally shoots Winston Boogie Smith Jr, a 32-year-old man, in the Uptown area of Minneapolis.
- June 25 – Former Minneapolis police officer Derek Chauvin is sentenced to 22 1/2 years in state prison for the murder of George Floyd, and to 21 years in federal prison for violating Floyd's civil rights.
- August 15 – Greenwood Fire in northeastern Minnesota is first spotted at a few hundred acres; it grows to over 40 square miles (100 km^{2}) within about two weeks, destroying cabins and outbuildings.
- August 26 – The Minnesota State Fair reopens for the first time since 2019, with reduced attendance and some vendors opting out due to COVID concerns.
- October 10 – A mass shooting at the Seventh Street Truck Park bar in St. Paul, near the Xcel Energy Center, leaves one person dead and multiple injured.
- November 2 –
  - 2021 Minneapolis municipal election
  - 2021 Minneapolis mayoral election – Incumbent DFL mayor Jacob Frey wins reelection to a second term.
  - 2021 Saint Paul mayoral election – Incumbent DFL mayor Melvin Carter III wins reelection to a second term.
