= 2026 in Minnesota =

- Decades: 2000s; 2010s; 2020s
- See also: History of Minnesota; Historical outline of Minnesota; List of years in Minnesota; 2026 in the United States

The following is a list of events of the year 2026 in Minnesota.

== Incumbents ==
=== State government ===
- Governor: Tim Walz (D)
- Lieutenant Governor: Peggy Flanagan (DFL)

== Events ==
=== January ===
- January 5 – Tim Walz announces he is dropping his reelection campaign.
- January 6
  - The Department of Health and Human Services (HHS) announces it is halting $10 billion in social service programs to Minnesota and four other Democratic states.
  - The Department of Homeland Security (DHS) announces it is launching what it calls the largest immigration enforcement operation ever carried out, sending 2,000 agents to the Minneapolis–Saint Paul metro area.
- January 7 – An Immigration and Customs Enforcement (ICE) agent fatally shoots Renée Good in a car during a protest against immigration operations in Minneapolis. The DHS claims Good had tried to ram agents, but witnesses dispute this.
- January 9 – Four homeless Oglala men are detained by ICE under a bridge. Three of the men are taken to the ICE facility at Fort Snelling.
- January 12 – The state of Minnesota and the cities of Minneapolis and Saint Paul sue the DHS over the surge of federal law enforcement in the Twin Cities.
- January 14 – An ICE agent shoots and injured a man from Venezuela during an operation. ICE initially says the man attacked agents with a bat, but later reports say the officer fired through a door when shooting the man.
- January 17 – Governor Walz mobilizes the Minnesota National Guard to support the Minnesota State Patrol amid protests in Minneapolis.
- January 18
  - Protesters interrupt services at a Saint Paul church where ICE Twin Cities field director David Easterwood is a pastor, though it is unclear if he was in the church at the time.
  - The Associated Press reports the Department of Defense has ordered around 1,500 soldiers to be ready for a possible deployment to Minneapolis.
  - ICE agents forcibly enter the home of naturalized citizen ChongLy Thao in Saint Paul and detain him without a warrant, bringing him outside in his underwear. He is later released.
- January 20 – Immigration agents detain 5-year-old Liam Conejo Ramos and his father at their Columbia Heights home.
- January 22 – Two people are arrested and charged with federal offenses for the protest at a church in Saint Paul from January 18, including local activist Nekima Levy Armstrong. Federal prosecutors also ask for charges against journalist Don Lemon, who documented the protest, but a judge rejects this.
- January 24 – Border Patrol agents fatally shoot American citizen Alex Pretti in Minneapolis. One agent removes a gun from Pretti's holster before two others shoot him.
- January 27
  - A man is arrested for spraying vinegar on Representative Ilhan Omar (MN-05) during a town hall in Minneapolis.
  - Shelley Buck (DFL-Maplewood) and Meg Luger-Nikolai (DFL-Saint Paul), the former of whom ran unopposed, win special elections to the Minnesota House. Luger-Nikolai wins with 95.6% of the vote.
  - An ICE agent attempts to enter the Ecuadorian consulate in Minneapolis. The Ecuadorian government files an official complaint.
- January 29 – Don Lemon is arrested in Los Angeles, California in connection to the protest he covered on January 18.
- January 30 – The Department of Justice opens a federal civil rights probe into the shooting of Alex Pretti by Border Patrol agents.
- January 31 – Liam Conejo Ramos and his father are released from an immigration facility in Texas and flown back to Minnesota.

=== February ===
- February 4 – Border Czar Tom Homan says 700 federal officers, about a quarter of those deployed to Minnesota, will be withdrawn, following an agreement with state and local authorities to turn over arrested immigrants to federal authorities.
- February 10 – Gubernatorial candidate Jeff Johnson suspends his campaign following the murder of his daughter Hallie Tobler on February 7. Tobler was stabbed to death in her St. Cloud home, and her husband was arrested and charged with murder.
- February 12 – Tom Homan announces an end to Operation Metro Surge.
- February 25 – Vice President JD Vance announces that the Trump administration will temporarily halt some Medicaid to Minnesota over fraud concerns.
- February 27 – Attorney General Pam Bondi announces federal charges against 30 more people involved in the Saint Paul church protest from January 18.

=== March ===
- March 21 – Four people are killed in a house fire in White Bear Lake. The victims are identified as ice hockey reporter Jessi Pierce and her three children.

=== April ===
- April 16 – Hennepin County prosecutors charge an ICE agent with assault over a February incident in which the agent allegedly pointed his gun at two people on a highway.
- April 25 – North Dakota State Representative Liz Conmy and another person are killed in a plane crash near Crystal Airport in Brooklyn Park.
- April 28 – Federal and state authorities raid 22 locations in Minnesota as part of an investigation into alleged welfare fraud.

=== May ===
- May 18 – An ICE agent is charged with assault and lying about the incident by the Hennepin County District Attorney for the shooting that occurred on January 14.
- May 26 – Minneapolis Mayor Jacob Frey announces Police Chief Brian O'Hara is resigning amid allegations he interfered in an investigation regarding his conduct.

=== June ===
- June 11 – 2025 shootings of Minnesota legislators: Vance Boelter, who in June 2025 assassinated State Representative Melissa Hortman and her husband and attempted to kill State Senator John Hoffman and his wife, pleads guilty in federal court.

=== July ===
- July 19 – Nine people are injured in a mass shooting outside a Minneapolis nightclub.
- July 23 – Vance Boelter is sentenced to life in prison.
- July 26–27 – A series of cyberattacks affect municipal water systems in Minnesota. Investigators suspect hackers from Iran are behind the cyberattacks.
- July 27 – A federal judge blocks a law that bans prediction markets from operating in the state of Minnesota.

=== August ===
- August 12 – A man kills his partner and their child at a home daycare in Hopkins before killing himself. Police in Burnsville later find the man's mother dead in her home, and police say he killed her before the stabbing.
- August 22 – Far-right activist Jake Lang is arrested during a protest after he and two others allegedly drive on a sidewalk towards counter-protesters.

=== September ===
- September 2
  - Two people are killed and six injured in a mass shooting in downtown Minneapolis. The shooter is also killed.
  - A federal grand jury indicts an ICE officer on charges of lying to the FBI in connection to the January 14 shooting of a Venezuelan immigrant.
- September 30 – A stolen car containing seven teenagers drives into the side of a semi-truck in Minneapolis, killing three teens. The truck driver is uninjured.

=== October ===
- October 12 – Federal agents search Ilhan Omar's home in Washington in connection to a criminal investigation. Trump and his allies have previously accused the Somalian-born Omar of immigration fraud, which she denies.
- October 28 – Conservative influencers James O'Keefe and Cam Higby are charged with unlawful voting and identity theft over a video they made in August registering to vote while dressed as Muslims.

=== November ===
- November 3 – 2026 Minnesota elections:
  - 2026 Hennepin County Attorney election
  - 2026 Minnesota House of Representatives election
  - 2026 Minnesota Attorney General election
  - 2026 Minnesota gubernatorial election: Senator Amy Klobuchar wins the election, beating state Speaker of the House Lisa Demuth.
  - 2026 Minnesota Secretary of State election
  - 2026 Minnesota Senate election
  - 2026 Minnesota State Auditor election
  - 2026 United States House of Representatives elections in Minnesota
  - 2026 United States Senate election in Minnesota: Lieutenant Governor Peggy Flanagan wins the election, beating former sportscaster Michele Tafoya. Flanagan is the first Native American woman to be elected to the Senate.
- November 14 – An Uber driver is critically injured after an attack by a passenger in Hopkins, during which the driver is strangled and run over with his own car. The passenger is charged with attempted murder as a hate crime, with prosecutors saying he did not like the driver's first name being Mohamed.
- November 18 – Two children are killed in a shooting in Savage.

=== Sports ===
- December 26, 2025 – January 5, 2026: 2026 World Junior Ice Hockey Championships
- June 20-26 – 2026 Special Olympics USA Games
- August 1 – WWE's SummerSlam (2026) takes place in the U.S. Bank Stadium in Minneapolis.

== See also ==
- 2026 in the United States
