= 2024 Minnesota Senate district 45 special election =

2024 District 45 special election
- November 5, 2024

Minnesota Senate District 45
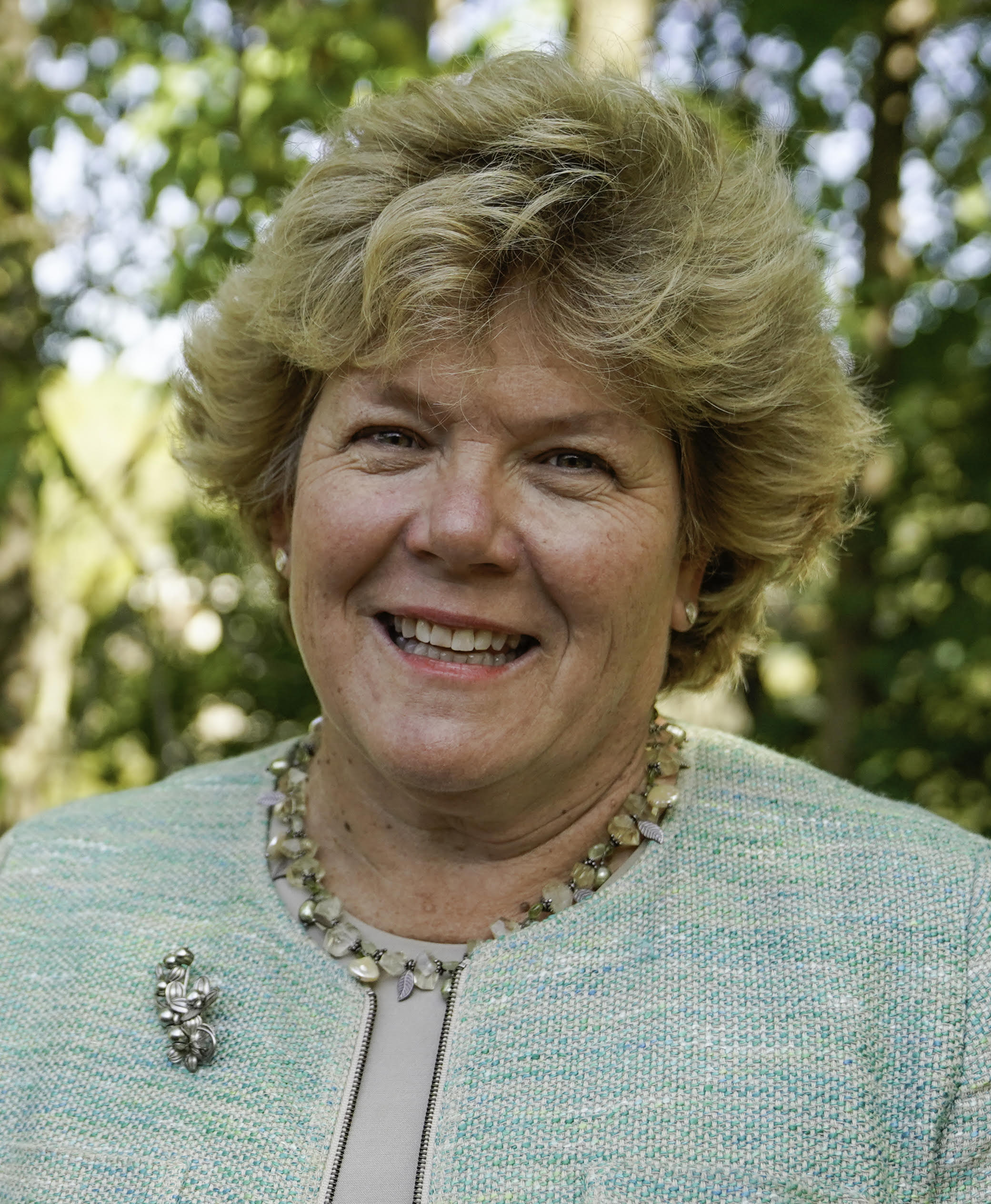

Nominee	Ann Johnson Stewart	Kathleen Fowke
Party	Democratic (DFL)	Republican
Popular vote	29,791	26,969
Percentage	52.43%	47.47%
- Precinct results Johnson Stewart: 50–60% 60–70% 70–80% Fowke: 50–60% 60–70%
Senator before election
Kelly Morrison
Democratic (DFL)
Elected Senator
Ann Johnson Stewart
Democratic (DFL)

A special election was held in the U.S. state of Minnesota on November 5, 2024, concurrently with the state general election, to elect a new member for District 45 in the Minnesota Senate. This was caused by the resignation of Democratic–Farmer–Labor (DFL) senator Kelly Morrison, who successfully sought election to the United States House of Representatives in Minnesota's third congressional district.

== Background ==
On June 6, 2024, District 45 incumbent Kelly Morrison resigned her seat, citing her full-time campaign for Minnesota's 3rd congressional district and her desire for the special election to her seat to be held during a general election.

District 45 is located in southwestern Hennepin County, containing the municipalities around Lake Minnetonka. In the last election in 2022, Morrison won with 56 percent of the vote.

The special candidate filing period was from June 10 to June 11, 2024.

The primary election was held on August 13, 2024.

== Democratic–Farmer–Labor primary ==
=== Candidates ===
==== Nominee ====
- Ann Johnson Stewart, former state senator from district 44

==== Eliminated in primary ====
- Emily Reitan, business consultant
- Kyle Jasper Meinen

=== Results ===
2024 Minnesota Senate District 45 Special Democratic-Farmer-Labor Primary
Party	Candidate	Votes	%
Democratic–Farmer–Labor Party	Ann Johnson Stewart	3,701	58.92
Democratic–Farmer–Labor Party	Emily Reitan	2,432	38.72
Democratic–Farmer–Labor Party	Kyle Jasper Meinen	148	2.36
Total		6281	100

== Republican primary ==
=== Candidates ===
==== Nominee ====
- Kathleen Fowke, candidate for the seat in 2022

=== Results ===
2024 Minnesota Senate District 45 Special Republican Primary
Party	Candidate	Votes	%
Republican	Kathleen Fowke	2,574	100
Total		2,574	100

== General election ==
The special general election was held November 5, 2024.

=== Results ===
2024 Minnesota Senate District 45 Special Election
Party	Candidate	Votes	%
Democratic–Farmer–Labor Party	Ann Johnson Stewart	29,791	52.43
Republican	Kathleen Fowke	26,969	47.47
Write-in		58	0.10
Total		56,818	100

== See also ==
- List of special elections to the Minnesota Senate
