= 2021 Saint Paul mayoral election =

- November 2, 2021
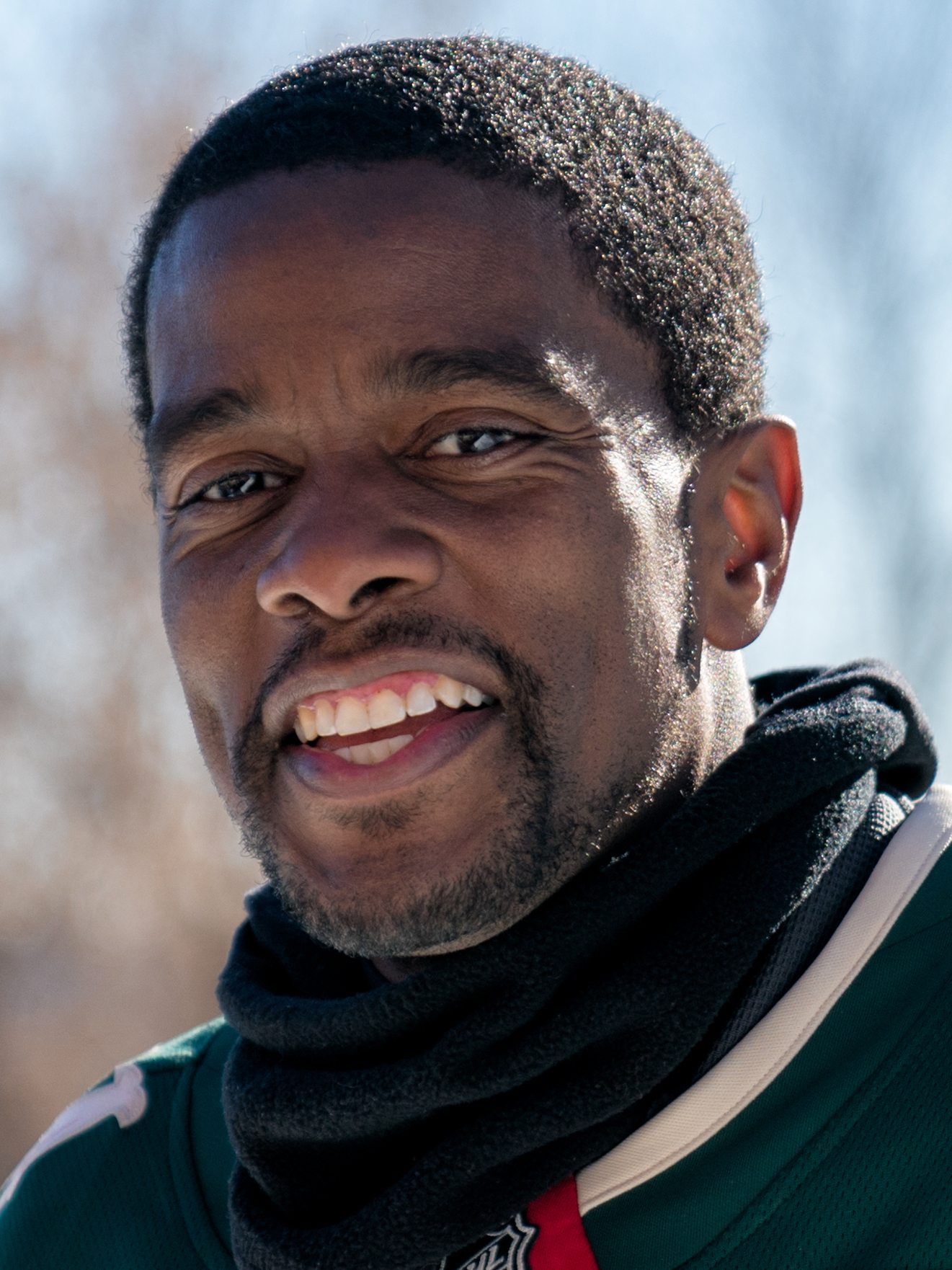

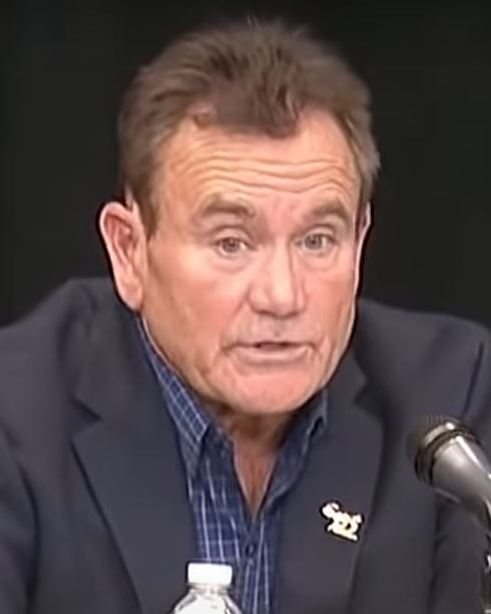

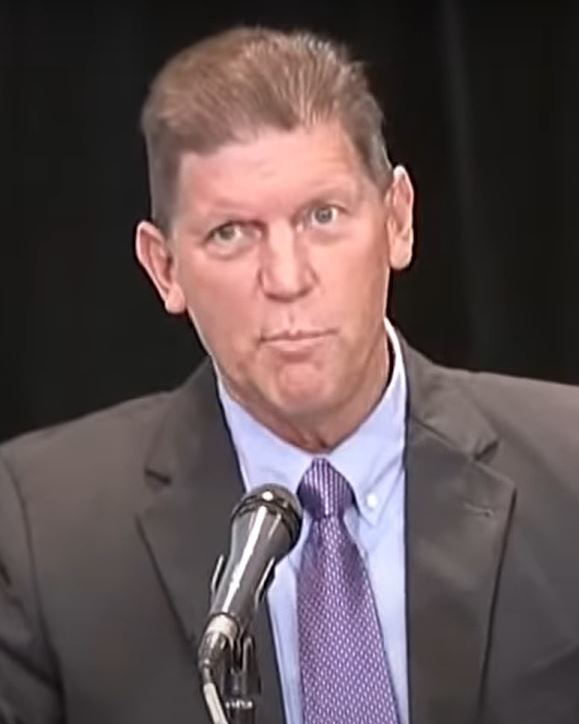

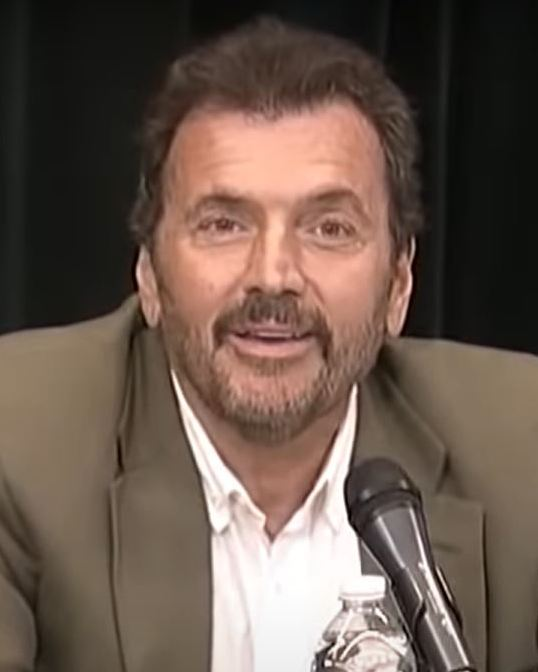
Candidate	Melvin Carter III	Dino Guerin
Party	Democratic (DFL)	Independent
Popular vote	36,426	7,454
Percentage	61.63%	12.61%
Candidate	Paul Langenfeld	Bill Hosko
Party	Independent	Independent
Popular vote	5,298	3,423
Percentage	8.96%	5.79%
- Carter: >90% 80–90% 70–80% 60–70% 50–60% 40–50% 30–40% Guerin: 30–40%
Mayor before election
Melvin Carter III
Democratic (DFL)
Elected mayor
Melvin Carter III
Democratic (DFL)

The city of Saint Paul, Minnesota held an election on November 2, 2021, to elect the mayor. It was held with ranked-choice voting, and there was no primary election. Few candidates filed to challenge incumbent mayor Melvin Carter III, and he easily won a second term with over 60% of first-preference votes.

== Background ==
Incumbent Mayor Melvin Carter III announced he would seek a second term as mayor on January 26, 2021. During his first term, Mayor Carter presided over the unrest in the Twin Cities after the murder of George Floyd in Minneapolis; making policing and public safety top of mind for voters in Saint Paul. Additionally, voters were concerned about issues like homelessness, a possible recession, and the ongoing COVID-19 pandemic.

Carter campaigned on achievements like an initiative to provide newborns with a college savings account, a pilot program that distributed guaranteed income for some low-income families, and rethinking public safety. Despite entering the race unopposed, Carter was facing several opponents by the close of the filing deadline on August 10, 2021.

In total, Carter faced seven challengers, including: Paul Langenfeld, vice president of the Board of Directors of Highland District Council and founder of a non-profit that caters to people with disabilities; Dino Guerin, former St. Paul District Fire Chief St. Paul City Councilman and Ramsey County commissioner; Dora Jones-Robinson, the executive director of Mentoring Young Adults and founder of Guns Down St. Paul; Miki Frost, father of five and founder of "Truce Center"; Scott Wergin, a contractor; Bill Hosko, a downtown coffee shop proprietor art gallery owner and architectural illustrator; and Abu Nayeem, a data analyst who had previously run for St. Paul City Council in 2019.

Most of Carter's opponents supported lowering crime rates and implementing better social systems in the city of St. Paul.

Carter's opponents failed to match him in endorsements—the mayor won the Saint Paul Democratic-Farmer-Labor Party's endorsement on July 18, 2021, as well as endorsements from Minnesota Governor Tim Walz and Lt. Governor Peggy Flannagan—but Paul Langenfeld was able to self-finance his campaign to match Mayor Carter's.

== Candidates ==
=== Declared ===
- Melvin Carter III, incumbent mayor (DFL)
- Miki Frost, mentor for troubled youth (Independent)
- Dino Guerin, investigative assistant at the Ramsey County Sheriff's Department, former Ramsey County commissioner, former Saint Paul District Fire Chief, and former city councillor
- Bill Hosko, artist, cafe owner, and perennial candidate
- Dora Jones-Robinson, gun control activist
- Paul Langenfeld, personal care attendant and former vice president of the Highland Park district council
- Abu Nayeem, data analyst and community organizer
- Scott Evans Wergin, biochemist

=== Declined ===
- Pat Harris, former city councillor and candidate for mayor in 2017 (DFL) (endorsed Carter)

== Endorsements ==
Melvin Carter III (DFL)

State officials

- Tim Walz, Governor of Minnesota
- Peggy Flanagan, Lieutenant Governor of Minnesota

City officials

- Pat Harris, former member of Saint Paul City Council and candidate for mayor in 2017

Labor unions

- International Brotherhood of Electrical Workers
- North Central States Regional Council of Carpenters
- SEIU Minnesota
- AFSCME Council 5
- Saint Paul Firefighters IAFF Local 21

Political parties

- St. Paul DFL

Publications

- The Star Tribune

== Results ==
General election results
Party	Candidate	Votes	%
Democratic (DFL)	Melvin Carter III (incumbent)	36,426	61.63
Nonpartisan	Dino Guerin	7,454	12.61
Nonpartisan	Paul Langenfeld	5,298	8.96
Nonpartisan	Bill Hosko	3,423	5.79
Nonpartisan	Dora Jones-Robinson	2,357	3.99
Nonpartisan	Miki Frost	2,069	3.50
Nonpartisan	Abu Nayeem	1,516	2.57
Nonpartisan	Scott Evans Wergin	355	0.60
Write-in		205	0.35
Total votes		59,103	100.00
