= Andrew Myers (politician) =

American politician

Member of the Minnesota House of Representatives from the 45A district
- Incumbent
- Assumed office January 3, 2023
- Preceded by: Kelly Morrison (Redistricted)

Personal details
- Party: Republican
- Spouse: Amanda
- Children: 4
- Education: Bradley University (B.A.); University of Montana (J.D.)
- Occupation: Business owner; Legislator
- Website: Government website Campaign website

Andrew Myers is an American politician serving in the Minnesota House of Representatives since 2023. A member of the Republican Party of Minnesota, Myers represents District 45A in the western Twin Cities metropolitan area, which includes the cities of Mound, Minnetrista, and Orono and parts of Hennepin County.

== Early life, education and career ==
Myers grew up in a small town in central Illinois. He earned a B.A. in business from Bradley University and a J.D. from the University of Montana.

Myers has lived in Minnesota for over 16 years, and served on the Minnetonka Beach City Council and Planning Commission and on the Tonka Bay Parks and Docks Commission before his election to the legislature. He has been a licensed attorney in Minnesota for over 15 years and serves on the Board of the Westonka Food Shelf.

In 2021, before the revelations of her misconduct, Myers supported Jennifer Carnahan for state Republican Party chair.

== Minnesota House of Representatives ==
Myers was elected to the Minnesota House of Representatives in 2022. He first ran in 2020 against one-term DFL incumbent Kelly Morrison and lost. In 2022, Myers ran for an open seat after legislative redistricting and after Morrison announced she would seek election to the Minnesota Senate.

Myers serves on the Capital Investment, Housing Finance and Policy, and Labor and Industry Finance and Policy Committees.

=== Political positions ===
In 2020, Myers said closing "so-called tax loopholes" would only solve a fraction of the state's budget problem, that he would eliminate wasteful spending, and that he would oppose raising taxes on businesses. In 2023, he opposed a 1% sales tax in the Twin Cities metropolitan area, calling it "a little ridiculous". Myers was referring to the idea of raising taxes on everyone in the metropolitan area at a time when the state held a record $19 billion budget surplus.

In 2023, Myers co-founded the Suburban Solutions Caucus, a group of metropolitan-area lawmakers working toward balanced and reasonable solutions for suburban families.

In his first term in the House, Myers focused on protecting the environment, replacing vital infrastructure, investing in schools and educators, improving access to mental health, working to invest in local law enforcement, and making Minnesota more affordable for suburban families, including a bill to reduce the cost of car tab fees.

Myers authored and passed the bipartisan Keep It Clean Act. This act protects all of Minnesota's waters from dumping and littering.

Myers also secured $10.3 million for clean water infrastructure in Mound and nearly $1 million for safety improvements on Highway 7, which runs through St. Bonifacius, Minnetrista, Shorewood, Excelsior, and Greenwood.

During his first term, Myers proposed lowering the state gas tax, reducing car tab fees, and ongoing property tax relief. He supported small business incentives to help address workforce shortages, providing a balanced approach to supporting both labor and industry.

In 2023, the Minnesota Housing Partnership, a coalition that supports equitable housing policies, gave Myers its annual award for promoting housing affordability and access in Minnesota.

== Electoral history ==
2020 Minnesota State House - District 33B
Party	Candidate	Votes	%
Democratic (DFL)	Kelly Morrison (incumbent)	14,202	50.52
Republican	Andrew Myers	13,889	49.41
Write-in		18	0.06
Total votes		28,109	100.0
Democratic (DFL) hold			

2022 Minnesota State House - District 45A
Party	Candidate	Votes	%
Republican	Andrew Myers	12,830	53.03
Democratic (DFL)	Lauren Bresnahan	11,356	46.94
Write-in		8	0.03
Total votes		24.194	100.0
Republican hold			

== Personal life ==
Myers lives in Tonka Bay, Minnesota with his wife, Amanda, and has four children.
