= Kaohly Her =

American politician (born 1973)

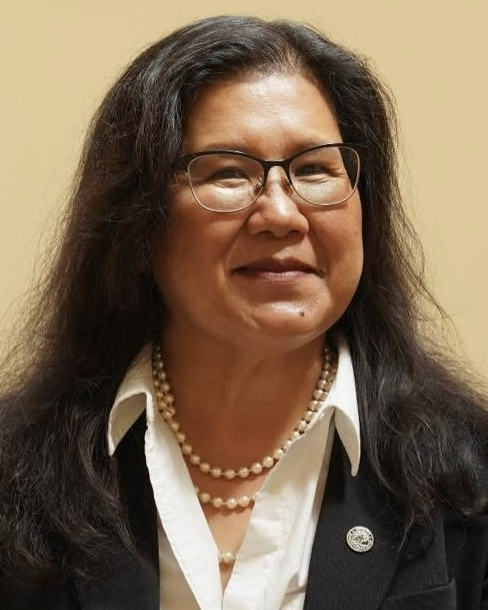
- Her in 2025

55th Mayor of St. Paul
- Incumbent
- Assumed office January 2, 2026
- Preceded by: Melvin Carter

Member of the Minnesota House of Representatives from the 64A district
- In office January 8, 2019 – November 17, 2025
- Preceded by: Erin Murphy
- Succeeded by: Meg Luger-Nikolai

Personal details
- Born: June 18, 1973 (age 53) Laos
- Party: Democratic (DFL)
- Spouse: Kong Her
- Children: 2
- Education: University of Wisconsin, Madison (BBA); Northeastern University (MBA); University of St. Thomas (EdD)
- Website: State House website House campaign website Mayoral campaign website

Kaohly Vang Her (/kəˈli hɜːr/ kə-LEE hur; RPA: Nkauj Hli Vaj Hawj; born June 18, 1973) is an American politician serving since 2026 as the 56th mayor of Saint Paul. She is the first woman and first Asian American to hold this position.

From 2019 to 2025, Her served in the Minnesota House of Representatives. A member of the Minnesota Democratic–Farmer–Labor Party (DFL), she represented District 64A, which includes parts of Saint Paul in Ramsey County, Minnesota.

== Early life, education, and career ==
Her was born in Laos, where she and her family lived in a refugee camp due to the Vietnam War. Hmong was her first language. Her father worked for the U.S. consulate, her uncle was employed by USAID, and her grandfather fought alongside the U.S. Army and the CIA in the Laotian Civil War before resettling in the United States. She came to the U.S. as a Hmong refugee at age four and grew up in Appleton, Wisconsin.

Her attended the University of Wisconsin–Madison, graduating with a Bachelor of Business Administration; the University of St. Thomas, studying education leadership; and Northeastern University, graduating with a Master of Business Administration in international management.

Her worked in the investment and finance sector for 15 years after graduating from college. She was a community organizer, director of Hmong women's organization Hnub Tshiab: Hmong Women Achieving Together, and founder of Maiv-PAC to advocate for Hmong-American women. Her has served on the Saint Paul Human Rights Commission and as the Administrator of the Saint Paul Public Schools Board of Education. She was a policy director for Saint Paul Mayor Melvin Carter.

== Minnesota House of Representatives ==
Her was elected to the Minnesota House of Representatives in 2018 and has been reelected every two years since. She first ran after six-term DFL incumbent Erin Murphy retired to run for governor of Minnesota. She was the first of two Hmong-American women elected to the Minnesota House along with Samantha Vang.

Her served on the Health Finance and Policy, Legacy Finance, and State and Local Government Committees and as chair of the Legislative Commission on Pensions and Retirement. She served as majority whip of the House from 2021 to 2022, making her the first Hmong-American woman to hold a leadership position in the House. Her is a member of the Minnesota Asian Pacific (MAP) Caucus and the House People of Color and Indigenous (POCI) Caucus.

=== Ban on child marriages ===
Her authored the End Child Marriage Bill, which raised Minnesota's legal marriage age to 18 without exceptions. Previous law allowed 16- and 17-year olds to wed with their parents' permission and judicial approval, often as a result of forced marriages. Her said that when she was in high school an older man sought her parents' permission to marry her, but her father refused. The bill passed the House unanimously.

=== Public safety and policing ===
After the murder of George Floyd, Her wrote a bill for police arbitration reform, establishing a special roster of arbitrators to deal with cop cases and changing the process of arbitrator selection. She has authored legislation to change the requirements for police disability claims, saying that "bad actors" were using the current system for personal gain. She supported legislation to provide incentives to train and hire new police officers, saying it would increase diversity within departments.

Her has supported anti-hate crime legislation to address an increase in violence targeting the Asian-American community, and called for gun safety measures such as red flag and safe storage laws. Her authored legislation that would require gun owners to notify law enforcement within 48 hours of noticing their firearm is missing. She spoke in support of a House resolution to declare racism a public health emergency and form a select committee to address racism.

=== Other political positions ===
Her has supported legislation to create a new, higher income tax tier for those with income over $500,000. She authored legislation to boost school districts' English language learners (ELL) programs, and a bill to give foster kids grants to help cover college expenses.

Her sponsored legislation that would allow a vote to amend the Minnesota Constitution to include equal rights protections based on "race, color, creed, sex, sexual orientation, gender identity or expression, age, disability, ancestry or national origin". She criticized the Trump administration for its push to deport Vietnam War-era refugees, calling it a "betrayal of wartime promises" and for deporting other Hmong and Lao immigrants.

Her supported the city of St. Paul's efforts to give newborns automatic college savings accounts, appearing with Mayor Melvin Carter at a news conference about the program. Her, who was employed as Carter's policy director, then authored a bill to help fund the program. Her was criticized by House Republicans, and ethics watchdog Common Cause stated she should have recused herself and not carried the bill. Her said "there is no conflict" and that she was not asked by the mayor to author the legislation.

== Mayor of St. Paul ==
=== 2025 election campaign ===
Her challenged Carter in the 2025 Saint Paul mayoral election. On November 4, 2025, she defeated Carter in what was considered an upset. Her is the first woman and first Hmong American to be mayor of Saint Paul.

=== Tenure ===
Her was sworn into office on January 2, 2026. Her is an outspoken critic of ICE, encouraging people to video ICE officers. She has called Operation Metro Surge a "siege". On January 28, 2026, Her met with "Border Czar" Tom Homan.

Sexual harassment lawsuit

In July 2026, Saint Paul Police Chief Axel Henry had filed a formal sexual harassment complaint against Her. An investigation by the city's human resources department and a local law firm concluded that Her did not sexually harass Henry or other employees, but did engage in "offensive and inappropriate behavior", recommending workplace conduct training. Henry's civil lawsuit alleged inappropriate conduct, including unwanted touching during a budget meeting, inappropriate sexual comments and innuendo, and sharing sexualized materials. Henry also claimed the mayor retaliated against him after he filed an internal HR complaint by excluding him from decisions and withholding his raises. Additional claims involved a high-ranking female officer alleging inappropriate comments in the gym, as well as an incident reported when Her was a mayoral assistant.

== Electoral history ==
2018 Minnesota State House - District 64A
Party	Candidate	Votes	%
Democratic (DFL)	Kaohly Her	18,995	84.14
Republican	Patrick JD Griffin	3,532	15.64
Write-in		49	0.22
Total votes		22,576	100.0
Democratic (DFL) hold			

2020 Minnesota State House - District 64A
Party	Candidate	Votes	%
Democratic (DFL)	Kaohly Her (incumbent)	20,621	85.62
Republican	Sherry Schack	3,419	14.20
Write-in		44	0.18
Total votes		24,084	100.0
Democratic (DFL) hold			

2022 Minnesota State House - District 64A
Party	Candidate	Votes	%
Democratic (DFL)	Kaohly Her (incumbent)	18,080	85.11
Republican	Dan Walsh	3,128	14.73
Write-in		34	0.16
Total votes		21,242	100.0
Democratic (DFL) hold			

2024 Minnesota State House - District 64A
Party	Candidate	Votes	%
Democratic (DFL)	Kaohly Her (incumbent)	20,441	83.17
Republican	Dan Walsh	4,080	16.60
Write-in		56	0.23
Total votes		24,577	100.0
Democratic (DFL) hold			

2025 Saint Paul mayoral election
Candidate	Round 1		Round 2	
Candidate	Votes	%	Votes	%
Kaohly Her	25,884	38.28	32,295	47.76
Melvin Carter III (incumbent)	27,611	40.83	30,418	44.98
Yan Chen	6,522	9.64	Eliminated	
Mike Hilborn	5,815	8.59	Eliminated	
Adam Dullinger	1,619	2.39	Eliminated	
Write-ins	166	0.24	Eliminated	
Exhausted ballots	—N/a		4,904 ballots	
Total	67,617	100.0%	62,713	100.0%

== Personal life ==
She and her husband, Kong, have two children. She resides in St. Paul.

Political offices
Preceded by Melvin Carter	Mayor of St. Paul; 2026–present	Incumbent
