= Cindy Pugh =

American politician

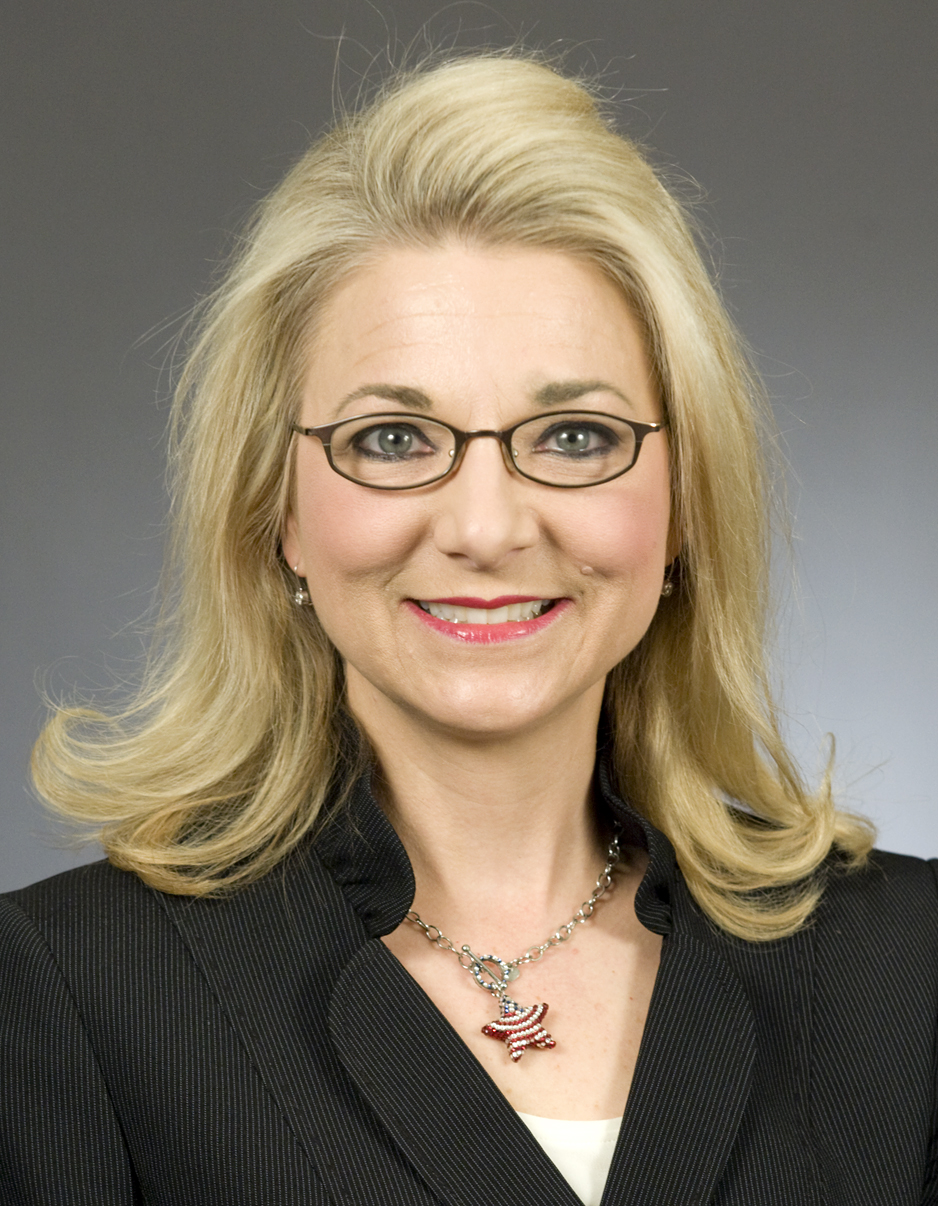

Member of the Minnesota House of Representatives from the 33B district
- In office January 8, 2013 – January 7, 2019
- Preceded by: Connie Doepke (redistricted)
- Succeeded by: Kelly Morrison

Personal details
- Born: May 1, 1957 (age 69)
- Party: Republican
- Spouse: Jack
- Children: 2
- Education: University of Wisconsin–Madison (BS)

Cindy Pugh (born May 1, 1957) is an American politician and former member of the Minnesota House of Representatives. A member of the Republican Party of Minnesota, she represented District 33B in the western Twin Cities metropolitan area.

== Education ==
Pugh attended the University of Wisconsin–Madison, graduating with a B.S. in Consumer Science. She also received a FastTrac Certificate from the School of Entrepreneurship at the University of St. Thomas.

== Minnesota House of Representatives ==
Pugh was first elected to the Minnesota House of Representatives in 2012. Pugh, a Tea Party leader, followed "Republican Michele Bachmann’s call to politics."

Democrat Kelly Morrison, a first-time candidate, defeated Pugh in the 2018 general election. Morrison's election represents the first time the bulk of the area composing today's District 33B have been represented by a member of the DFL party in nearly 4 decades.

== Personal life ==
Pugh is married to her husband, Jack. They have two children and reside in Chanhassen, Minnesota.

== Political activities ==
Pugh was a co-founder of the Southwest Metro Tea Party and follower of Michele Bachmann.

== Controversies ==
Pugh and two other Republicans generated controversy in 2018 when they claimed to have knowledge of a "plot to 'mobilize Muslims to infiltrate our Republican caucuses'." The chairperson of the Minnesota Republican Party later rejected the post, stating that Muslims were welcome to caucus with Republicans and noting that "there is no religious test to participate in the Republican caucus." Pugh later renounced the post, but charges of Islamophobia based on this event and others continued to follow her.
