= Samakab Hussein =

American politician

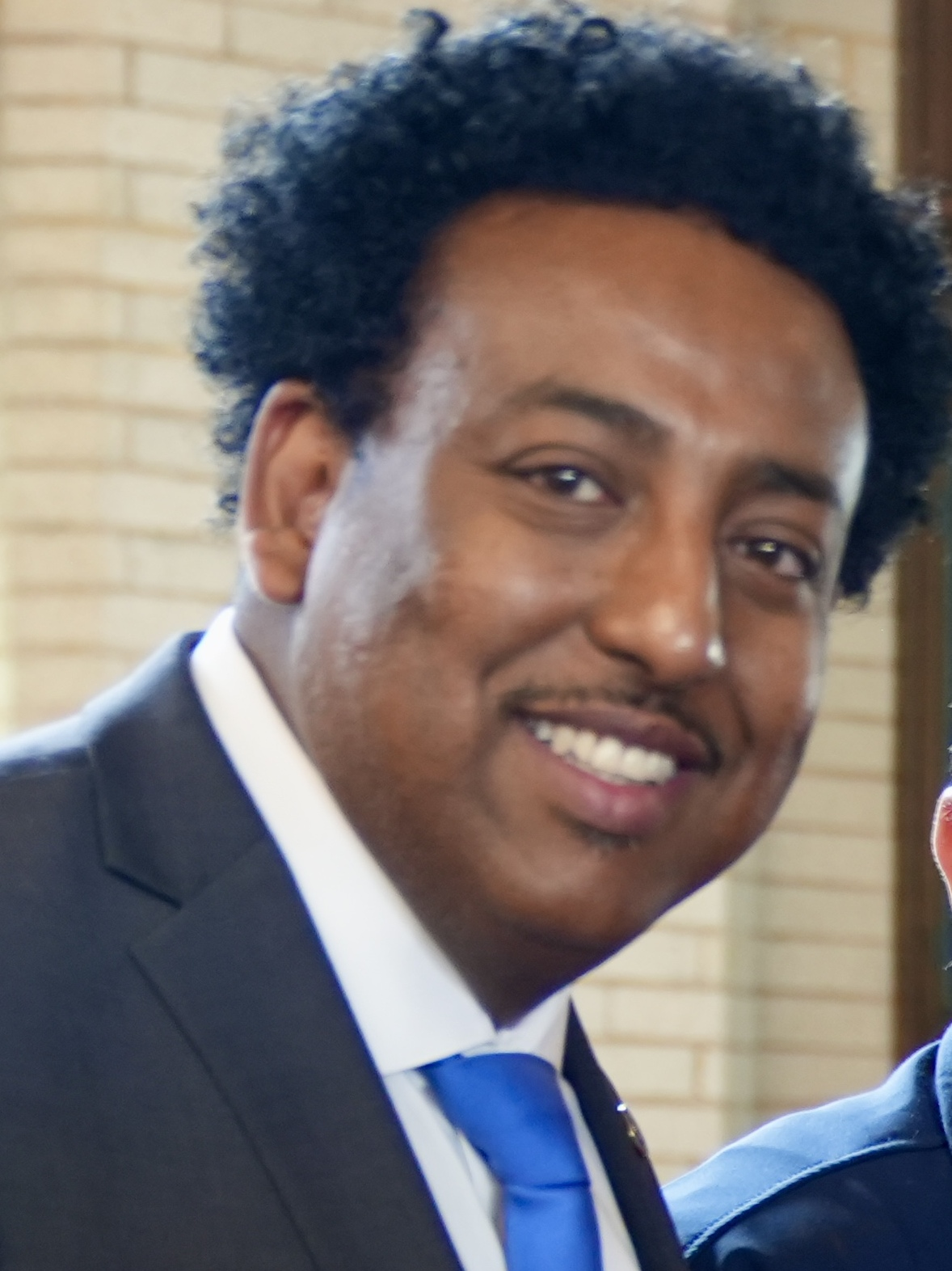

Member of the Minnesota House of Representatives from the 65A district
- Incumbent
- Assumed office January 3, 2023
- Preceded by: Rena Moran

Personal details
- Born: October 12, 1980 (age 45) Somalia
- Party: Democratic (DFL)
- Education: Saint Mary's University of Minnesota(BA); Metropolitan State University
- Occupation: Small business owner
- Website: Campaign website

Samakab Hussein (born October 12, 1980) is an American politician serving in the Minnesota House of Representatives since 2023. A member of the Minnesota Democratic-Farmer-Labor Party (DFL), Hussein represents District 65A in the Twin Cities, which includes parts of the city of Saint Paul in Ramsey County.

== Early life, education and career ==
Hussein came to the United States from Somalia when he was 14. He received his bachelor's degree in business and accounting from Saint Mary's University of Minnesota, and a M.A.P.L. in advocacy and political leadership from Metropolitan State University in 2023.

In 2015, Hussein unsuccessfully challenged Ward 1 Saint Paul city councilor Dai Thao. Thao challenged many of Hussein's delegates, saying that they lived in Minneapolis, not Saint Paul. Hussein's campaign manager called the claims "absolutely baseless". The DFL endorsing convention lasted 10 hours and ended with no endorsement after neither candidate reached the 60% delegate threshold.

In 2016, Hussein was a delegate for Hillary Clinton in Minnesota's delegation to the 2016 Democratic National Convention. The Minnesota delegation had the largest number of Muslim and Somali delegates at the convention.

Hussein supported former city council member and BMO Harris Bank senior vice president Pat Harris's 2017 Saint Paul mayoral campaign.

== Minnesota House of Representatives ==
Hussein was elected to the Minnesota House of Representatives in 2022. He first ran after redistricting and after six-term DFL incumbent Rena Moran announced she would run for Ramsey County Commissioner. He is the first Somali-American to represent St. Paul in the Minnesota Legislature.

Hussein is vice chair of the Legacy Finance Committee and serves on the Capital Investment, Housing Finance and Policy, and Labor and Industry Finance and Policy Committees.

=== Political positions ===
Hussein supported legislation that would have guaranteed rideshare drivers for companies like Uber and Lyft wage increases, employment protections and better insurance coverage. The bill passed both chambers of the legislature, but was vetoed by Governor Tim Walz on May 25, 2023.

Hussein joined a group of four Muslim legislators who condemned a Star Tribune editorial cartoon they called racist and Islamophobic. Star Tribune CEO and publisher Steve Grove apologized for the cartoon. In the aftermath of a suspected arson at a Saint Paul mosque, Hussein said he would push legislators to hold the offenders accountable and called for solidarity with the Muslim community.

== Electoral history ==
2022 Minnesota State House − District 65A
Party	Candidate	Votes	%
Democratic (DFL)	Samakab Hussein	7,018	71.21
Republican	John Schonebaum	1,522	15.44
Legal Marijuana Now	Miki Frost	1,302	13.21
Write-in		13	0.13
Total votes		9,855	100.0
Democratic (DFL) hold			

2024 Minnesota State House − District 65A
Party	Candidate	Votes	%
Democratic (DFL)	Samakab Hussein (incumbent)	10,068	97.07
Write-in		304	2.93
Total votes		10,372	100.00
Democratic (DFL) hold			

== Personal life ==
Hussein lives in Saint Paul, Minnesota, with his spouse, and has two children. He is Muslim.
