= 2024 Minnesota elections =

2024 Minnesota general election
- November 5, 2024
- Turnout: 76.35%

A general election was held in the U.S. state of Minnesota on November 5, 2024. All seats in the Minnesota House of Representatives were up for election as well as several judicial seats, Minnesota's 10 presidential electors, a United States Senate seat, Minnesota's eight seats in the United States House of Representatives, one seat of the Minnesota Senate, and several positions for local offices.

Kamala Harris won Minnesota with 50.9% of the vote, with Donald Trump receiving 46.9%. Amy Klobuchar won a fourth term to the U.S. Senate with 56.3% of votes to GOP Royce White's 40.5%. All U.S. House incumbents won re-election, while former Minnesota state senator Kelly Morrison was elected to replace retiring DFL Representative Dean Phillips for MN-03. The state house election saw three seats flip to the Republican Party, leaving the Minnesota House of Representatives in the second-ever tie since 1979.

The presidential election could have brought significant changes to Minnesota's state government if Vice President Kamala Harris had won. Minnesota Governor Tim Walz would become vice president, making lieutenant governor Peggy Flanagan the state's first female and Native American governor, and Senate President Bobby Joe Champion lieutenant governor.

A primary election to nominate major party candidates for state offices, federal legislative offices, and several judicial and local offices was held on August 13, 2024. A presidential primary was held on March 5, 2024.

== Electoral system ==
Elections for state and federal offices are held via first-past-the-post voting. The candidate or bloc of presidential electors that wins the most votes will be elected. Presidential nominations for parties with major party status—then the Democratic–Farmer–Labor Party (DFL), Legal Marijuana Now, and Republican parties—were determined by an open primary election on March 5. All other partisan races held an open primary election on August 13, using the same process. Only two major parties (the DFL and Republican parties) were on the primary ballot after the Minnesota Supreme Court determined that Legal Marijuana Now is no longer a major party. The candidate that wins the most votes in each party becomes their party's nominee for the general election. If only a single candidate seeks the nomination for each party, a primary election for that office is not held. Judicial and several local elections were held via a nonpartisan blanket primary.

The candidate filing period was from May 21 to June 4, 2024. The filing period for cities, townships, school districts, and hospital districts for which a primary election is not possible was from July 30 until August 13, 2024. Early voting was held in-person and by mail.

== Federal elections ==
=== President of the United States ===
A presidential primary was held on March 5, 2024. The three major parties at the time had ballots: the DFL, the Republican Party, and the Legal Marijuana Now party (LMN). The winners were Joe Biden (DFL), Donald Trump (Republican Party), and Krystal Gabel (Legal Marijuana Now). Gabel received a plurality of votes for LMN, but had withdrawn prior to the election, leaving Dennis Schuller as the de facto nominee.

In the general election, Kamala Harris won Minnesota's 10 electors in the Electoral College. Minnesota has voted for the Democratic nominee in every presidential election since 1976, the longest streak of any U.S. state as of the 2024 election.

=== United States House of Representatives ===
Minnesota's eight seats in the United States House of Representatives were up for election. The DFL and the Republicans each held its four seats.

=== United States Senate ===
Incumbent Democratic Senator Amy Klobuchar won re-election for her fourth term.

== State elections ==
=== Legislative elections ===
==== Minnesota House of Representatives ====
All 134 seats in the Minnesota House of Representatives were up for election in 2024. The DFL lost 3 seats to the Republicans, and each now holds 67 seats.

On March 19, 2024, a special election was held for District 27B following the resignation of Kurt Daudt (R). Republican Bryan Lawrence won the seat with 84.5% of the vote and served for the 2024 legislative session. Lawrence won re-election in the general election.

==== Minnesota Senate ====
Senate District 45 in southwestern Hennepin County held a special election. The seat was vacant upon the resignation of Kelly Morrison on June 6, 2024. The DFL held the seat, electing Ann Johnson Stewart.

=== Judicial elections ===
There were several judicial offices on the ballot. A total of nine offices were contested, three of which are statewide.

Contested judicial elections
District	Seat	Jurisdiction	Candidates	Votes	%
Minnesota Supreme Court	Chief Justice	Statewide	Natalie Hudson (incumbent)	1,529,063	63.4%
Minnesota Supreme Court	Chief Justice	Statewide	Stephen A. Emery	872,720	36.2%
Minnesota Supreme Court	Associate Seat 6	Statewide	Karl Procaccini (incumbent)	1,322,180	56.6%
Minnesota Supreme Court	Associate Seat 6	Statewide	Matthew R. Hanson	1,003,978	43.0%
Minnesota Court of Appeals	Seat 12	Statewide	Diane Bratvold (incumbent)	1,437,341	63.5%
Minnesota Court of Appeals	Seat 12	Statewide	Jonathan R. Woolsey	816,943	36.1%
2nd Judicial District	Seat 3	Ramsey County	Timothy Carey (incumbent)	115,908	62.5%
2nd Judicial District	Seat 3	Ramsey County	Paul Yang	68,584	37.0%
2nd Judicial District	Seat 29	Ramsey County	Timothy Mulrooney (incumbent)	109,308	59.1%
2nd Judicial District	Seat 29	Ramsey County	Winona Yang	74,738	40.4%
4th Judicial District	Seat 24	Hennepin County	Matthew Frank (incumbent)	316,118	72.5%
4th Judicial District	Seat 24	Hennepin County	Christopher Leckrone	117,673	27.0%
6th Judicial District	Seat 6 (open)	Northeast Minnesota	Gunnar Johnson	52,817	45.4%
6th Judicial District	Seat 6 (open)	Northeast Minnesota	Shawn Reed	63,073	54.2%
6th Judicial District	Seat 6 (open)	Northeast Minnesota	Peter Raukar	Eliminated in primary	N/A
6th Judicial District	Seat 6 (open)	Northeast Minnesota	John B. Schulte	Eliminated in primary	N/A
6th Judicial District	Seat 6 (open)	Northeast Minnesota	Gerald K. Wallace	Eliminated in primary	N/A
7th Judicial District	Seat 5	Western Minnesota	Timothy M. Churchwell (incumbent)	102,067	50.9%
7th Judicial District	Seat 5	Western Minnesota	Joel A. Novak	97,694	48.7%
10th Judicial District	Seat 3	North metro	Helen Brosnahan (incumbent)	222,617	55.6%
10th Judicial District	Seat 3	North metro	Nathan Hansen	176,149	44.0%
Source: Office of the Minnesota Secretary of State

== State ballot measure ==
Amendment 1
- November 5, 2024
- Environment and Natural Resources Trust Fund Renewal

Yes
90–100%
80–90%
70–80%
60–70%
50–60%
No
90–100%
80–90%
70–80%
60–70%
50–60%
Other
Tie
No Votes

The Minnesota Environmental and Natural Resources Trust Fund (ENRTF) amendment was the only statewide ballot measure in Minnesota for 2024. The measure aimed to extend a 1988 law directing 40% of state lottery proceeds to environmental projects. The fund has raised over $1 billion since 1991. The amendment required a majority vote of all voters in the election, meaning abstaining was effectively a "no" vote. The ENRTF had been set to expire in 2025. The measure extended it until 2050.

The measure passed with 83% of the vote and was supported by a majority in all 87 Minnesota counties.

Constitutional Amendment 1
Choice	Votes	%
Yes	2,526,205	82.6
No	530,504	17.4
Total	3,056,709	100.0

== Local elections ==
Elections for several subdivisions were held, including elections for counties, municipalities, townships, and school districts.

=== Minneapolis ===
Minneapolis voters decided on a proposed $20 million increase to the Minneapolis Public Schools technology levy, raising it to $38 million over the next 10 years. The district aims to reduce reliance on its general fund for technology expenses. The tax increase would cost about $96 annually for a $350,000 home.

School District Question 1
Choice	Votes	%
Yes	126,924	66.35
No	64,366	33.65
Total	191,290	100.0

=== Saint Paul ===
St. Paul voters had two ballot questions. The first would have allowed the mayor to impose an early childhood care tax of up to $20 million per year, totaling $110 million over a decade, though the mayor stated he won't implement it even if passed, which it did not. The second question proposed shifting city elections from odd to even years to increase voter turnout and reduce costs. This question passed with about 60% support.

City Question 1 (Childcare)
Choice	Votes	%
No	77,064	59.9
Yes	51,501	40.1
Total	128,565	100.0

City Question 2 (Even-year elections)
Choice	Votes	%
Yes	74,941	60.72
No	48,475	39.28
Total	149,882	100.0
