= Ann Johnson Stewart =

American Democratic politician, university professor, and civil engineer

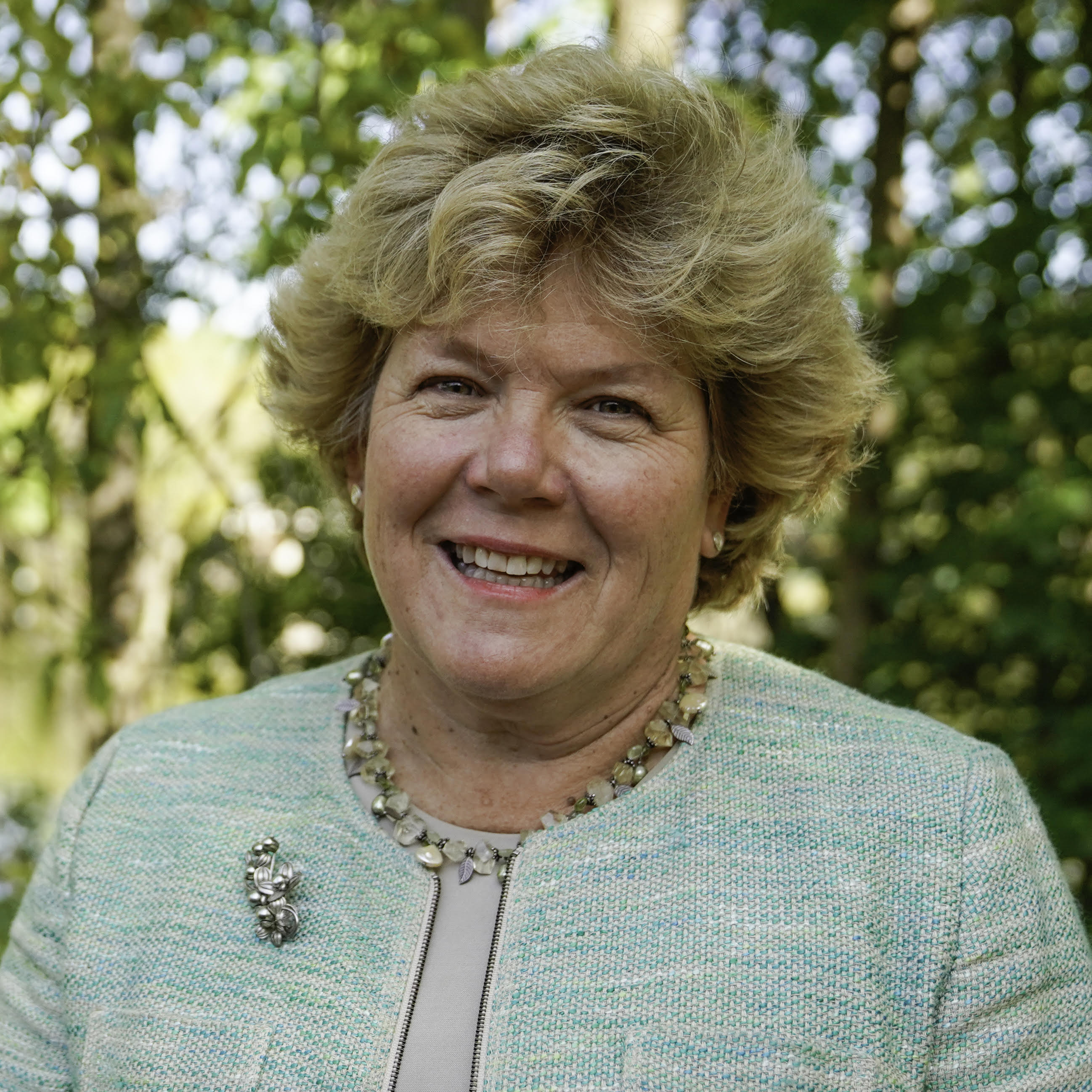
- Johnson Stewart in 2019

Member of the Minnesota Senate
- Incumbent
- Assumed office November 25, 2024
- Preceded by: Kelly Morrison
- Constituency: District 45
- In office January 5, 2021 – January 2, 2023
- Preceded by: Paul Anderson
- Succeeded by: Redestricted
- Constituency: District 44

Personal details
- Born: July 24, 1964 (age 62) Wausau, Wisconsin, U.S.
- Party: Democratic
- Spouse: Jeff
- Children: 4
- Education: University of Wisconsin Platteville (BE); University of Minnesota (ME)

Ann M. Johnson Stewart (born July 27, 1964) is an American Democratic politician, educator, and civil engineer from Minnesota. She is a member of the Minnesota Senate, representing District 45 since 2024. From 2021 to 2023 she represented District 44, which then included Plymouth, Minnetonka, and Woodland in Hennepin County in the Twin Cities metropolitan area. In 2024 she was elected to represent District 45, which contains Orono, Wayzata, much of Minnetonka, and other cities around Lake Minnetonka in western Hennepin County.

Johnson Stewart won the November 2024 special election for an open seat triggered by the resignation of Kelly Morrison, who ran for Congress. This was the only State Senate seat up for grabs in 2024.

== Life, academic career, and engineering career ==
Originally from Wisconsin, Johnson Stewart received her Bachelor of Civil Engineering from the University of Wisconsin-Platteville and her Master's at the University of Minnesota Twin Cities. She is a civil engineer with a small business that works with local governments to build publicly funded roads, bridges, and buildings. Johnson Stewart has also taught at the University of Minnesota and local technical colleges for over 20 years.

== Political involvement ==
Johnson Stewart defeated Greg Pulles in 2020 after incumbent Senator Paul Anderson decided not to run again. She served on the following committees:

- Capital Investment
- Transportation Finance and Policy

Her legislative priorities were transportation and infrastructure. She did not run for reelection in 2022.

=== Electoral history ===
2024 Minnesota Senate District 45 Special Election
Party	Candidate	Votes	%
Democratic–Farmer–Labor Party	Ann Johnson Stewart	29,791	52.43
Republican	Kathleen Fowke	26,969	47.47
Write-in		58	0.10
Total		56,818	100

2024 Minnesota Senate District 45 Special Democratic-Farmer-Labor Primary
Party	Candidate	Votes	%
Democratic–Farmer–Labor Party	Ann Johnson Stewart	3,701	58.92
Democratic–Farmer–Labor Party	Emily Reitan	2,432	38.72
Democratic–Farmer–Labor Party	Kyle Jasper Meinen	148	2.36
Total		6281	100

2020 Minnesota Senate District 44 Election
Party	Candidate	Votes	%
Democratic–Farmer–Labor Party	Ann Johnson Stewart	33,855	58.74
Republican	Greg Pulles	23,756	41.22
Write-in		25	0.04
Total		57,636	100

2020 Minnesota Senate District 44 Democratic-Farmer-Labor Primary
Party	Candidate	Votes	%
Democratic–Farmer–Labor Party	Ann Johnson Stewart	9,672	76.59
Democratic–Farmer–Labor Party	Zina Alston Fizer	2,956	23.41
Total		12,628	100
