= 2023 in Minnesota =

- Decades: 2000s; 2010s; 2020s
- See also: History of Minnesota; Historical outline of Minnesota; List of years in Minnesota; 2023 in the United States

The following is a list of events of the year 2023 in Minnesota.

== Incumbents ==
=== State government ===
- Governor: Tim Walz (D)
- Lieutenant Governor: Peggy Flanagan (DFL)

== Events ==
- June 28 – Smoke from the wildfires in Canada reaches several U.S. states, including Minnesota.
- August 7 – Tou Thao, a former Minneapolis police officer, is sentenced to four years and nine months in prison for his role in the murder of George Floyd. He is the fourth person in the case to be convicted in a state court.
- October 22 – During a pro-Palestine protest in Minneapolis, a white car drives through a group of protesters. No one is injured.
- December 20 – Minnesota votes to change its flag.
- December 29 – Around 120 people are rescued from a breakaway ice floe on Upper Red Lake near Bemidji.

== See also ==
- 2023 in the United States
