= 2024 in Minnesota =

- Decades: 2000s; 2010s; 2020s
- See also: History of Minnesota; Historical outline of Minnesota; List of years in Minnesota; 2024 in the United States

The following is a list of events of the year 2024 in Minnesota.

== Incumbents ==
=== State government ===
- Governor: Tim Walz (D)
- Lieutenant Governor: Peggy Flanagan (DFL)

== Events ==
- February 18 – 2024 Burnsville shooting: Two police officers and a paramedic are killed while responding to a domestic dispute in Burnsville. The perpetrator is also killed.
- March 5 – Super Tuesday:
  - The Democratic Party holds presidential nominating contests in Minnesota amongst other states.
  - The Republican Party holds presidential nominating contests in Minnesota amongst other states.
- May 11 – A new flag of Minnesota is adopted, replacing the previous design.
- May 30 – 2024 Minneapolis shooting: Four people, including a police officer, are killed in a mass shooting in Minneapolis.
- June 24 – Officials in Blue Earth County issue an evacuation warning due to flooding on the Blue Earth River breaching the Rapidan Dam, pushing it into an "imminent failure condition" upstream of several cities.
- August 6 – Presumptive Democratic Party nominee Kamala Harris selects Minnesota governor Tim Walz as her running mate.
- September 1 – Two people are killed and four more injured during a vehicle-ramming attack outside a restaurant in Minneapolis.

== See also ==
- 2024 in the United States
