= University of Minnesota Talented Youth Mathematics Program =

The University of Minnesota Talented Youth Mathematics Program (UMTYMP) is an alternative secondary mathematics education program operated by the University of Minnesota's School of Mathematics Center for Educational Programs (MathCEP). Classes are offered in St. Cloud, Rochester, Duluth, and Minneapolis, Minnesota. The Program is supported by the Minnesota state legislature. UMTYMP serves some of Minnesota's most talented math students. The course structure, intensity, and workload are comparable to college-level classes in rigor.

== Program ==
UMTYMP offers a total of five years of math coursework. The program is divided into a high school component and a calculus component.

=== High school component ===
The UMTYMP high school component lasts two years and covers standard high school mathematics. The classes are taught by local secondary school teachers.

- First year: Algebra I and II
- Second year: Geometry and Precalculus

Students receive high school credit for these courses. To pass each semester, a grade of at least 70% in the class must be achieved, and a grade of 70%-75% results in probation and potential ejection from the course.

One year of this component costs approximately $1,250, including the cost of textbooks.

=== Calculus component ===
The UMTYMP calculus component lasts three years and covers honors-level college calculus. The classes are taught by university faculty members.

- Calculus 1: single-variable calculus
- Calculus 2: differential equations, proof methods, set theory and linear algebra
- Calculus 3: multivariable calculus

Students receive both high school and University of Minnesota credit (4 credits per year) for these courses.

The content covered in UMTYMP Calculus 1 corresponds to that of AP Calculus BC. However, some topics in the AP Calculus BC curriculum are not covered.

One year of this component costs approximately $1,450, including the cost of textbooks.

=== Post-UMTYMP ===
UMTYMP graduates can take 4000- or 5000-level math classes at the University of Minnesota either as a undergraduates (if enrolled there for college) or as PSEO students (if still in high school). UMTYMP also offers an optional semester-long course known as Advanced Topics.

== Enrollment ==
Interested students in 5th to 7th grade are eligible to take a qualifying exam in April. Students who pass the qualifying exam are invited to enroll in UMTYMP's Algebra I/II class in the fall or may defer their enrollment for a year.

Non-UMTYMP students in 7th to 9th grade may take an entrance exam to begin the calculus component.

=== Demographics ===
In the 2005-2006 school year, 506 students from 134 public and 28 private schools were enrolled in UMTYMP. Of them, 421 attended classes in Minneapolis, 56 in Rochester, and 29 in St. Cloud. 361 (71%) were male and 145 (29%) were female. Among those who reported their ethnicity, 277 (62%) were White, 142 (32%) were Asian/Pacific Islanders, 10 (2%) were Chicano/Latino, 3 (0.7%) were Alaskan/American Indian, 2 (0.4%) were African-American, and 14 (3%) described themselves as other.
