= Minnesota IT Services =

Agency overview
- Formed: October 1, 2011
- Jurisdiction: Minnesota
- Headquarters: Saint Paul, Minnesota
- Employees: 2,400+
- Annual budget: $843 million (FY2024)
- Agency executive: Tarek Tomes, Commissioner and Chief Information Officer
- Website: mn.gov/mnit

Minnesota IT Services (MNIT) is the central information technology agency for the State of Minnesota's executive branch. Created on October 1, 2011, via legislative mandate consolidating executive-branch IT functions, MNIT centralizes IT services, personnel, and finances under one agency to provide enterprise solutions for state government.

== Role and scope ==
The agency provides services to more than 70 state agencies, boards, and commissions, and supports tens of thousands of state employees. On MNIT's "By the Numbers" section, the agency lists the following metrics: 375 partners and public-sector entities connected via its IT infrastructure and services; 5.5 million Minnesotans' data "secured" by MNIT; 32,000+ state employees supported via MNIT services; and 2,300+ technology professionals employed.

In its 2024 Annual Report, MNIT describes its leadership in modernization, cybersecurity, digital accessibility, infrastructure, and governance initiatives. As of FY 2024, MNIT's total expenses across all state agencies it supports amounted to $843 million.

MNIT oversees the Minnesota Network for Enterprise Telecommunications (MNET), a statewide communications network used by state agencies and other public entities. According to MinnState's MNET map, the network connects all 87 counties, approximately 300 cities, 200 public higher education campuses, and approximately 375 public sector partners or entities.

MNIT is charged with data protection, cybersecurity oversight, and setting IT policy, architecture, and standards for the executive branch. Its public pages sometimes state the agency "secures the data for 5.5 million Minnesotans."

== History ==
=== Pre-2011 environment and movement toward consolidation ===
Before 2011, most Minnesota state agencies operated their own IT systems and staff. Over time, there was interest in coordinating IT across agencies for efficiency and standardization.

=== Legislative consolidation in 2011 ===
In 2011, the Minnesota Legislature passed HF 191 (and related session law) to consolidate executive-branch IT services, budgets, and personnel under MNIT, effective October 1, 2011. The new agency was initially called the Office of Enterprise Technology (OET) and temporarily operated as "State IT" before being renamed Minnesota IT Services (MN.IT Services or MNIT) following an employee naming contest.

Although considerable consolidation occurred, the Office of the Legislative Auditor's 2019 evaluation notes that some aspects are incomplete. Some agencies still contest which IT responsibilities (e.g. software development, funding, or oversight) fall under MNIT. MNIT has not consistently enforced or documented required project oversight and approvals under existing law. Portions of the enabling statute are seen as outdated or overly broad, complicating oversight and authority.

The OLA evaluation also reports that, prior to consolidation, MNIT had approximately 2,000 employees and spent about $600 million in FY 2018. In February 2019, MPR News ran a story summarizing the audit's results, characterizing the review as "mixed" — noting both progress and ongoing challenges.

=== Major milestones ===
- 2011: IT consolidation legislation enacted; Office of Enterprise Technology created
- 2012: First comprehensive Service Level Agreements implemented; Minnesota IT Governance Framework published
- 2013: MNsure health insurance marketplace and Minnesota Eligibility Technology System (METS) launched
- 2014: Five-year data center consolidation project completed; Enterprise Data Center 4 facility opened
- 2019: Blue Ribbon Council on Information Technology established; Tarek Tomes appointed Commissioner
- 2021: Technology Advisory Council established by Legislature as permanent advisory body; $20 million cybersecurity investment approved

== Organization and leadership ==
MNIT is led by the Commissioner, who also serves as Minnesota's Chief Information Officer (CIO). The Commissioner is appointed by the Governor and subject to confirmation by the Minnesota Senate. As a cabinet-level position, the Commissioner provides strategic direction for information technology across state government.

=== Commissioners ===
Governor Mark Dayton appointed Carolyn Parnell as the first Commissioner of the Office of Enterprise Technology and State Chief Information Officer in February 2011. Following her tenure, Brigadier General Johanna Clyborne served as commissioner until January 2019, when Bill Poirier assumed the role as acting commissioner.

In April 2019, Governor Tim Walz appointed Tarek Tomes as Commissioner and State Chief Information Officer. Tomes, who previously served as Chief Innovation Officer for the City of Saint Paul and as an Assistant Commissioner at MNIT from 2008 to 2014, was confirmed by the Minnesota Senate on February 16, 2023. Tomes brings over 25 years of experience in managing technology innovation across diverse industries in both public and private sectors.

=== Governance ===
MNIT operates under the Minnesota IT Governance Framework, which establishes decision-making processes for enterprise IT investments and services. The Technology Advisory Council (TAC), established by the Legislature in 2021, advises MNIT and executive branch agencies on strategic information technology initiatives and service delivery. The council includes both public and private sector technology experts and legislative ex-officio members.

Minnesota Statute 16E governs MNIT's authority and responsibilities. However, certain agencies are exempted from IT consolidation, including constitutional offices, state retirement systems, the Minnesota Housing Finance Agency, and the Metropolitan Council.

== Services and operations ==
=== Agency relationships ===
Many state agencies rely on MNIT for IT infrastructure, procurement, software licensing, security, and support. For example, the Minnesota Department of Natural Resources (DNR) states that MNIT provides information infrastructure, tools, training, and technical support for DNR employees.

=== Projects and modernization ===
In partnership with the Minnesota Department of Health (MDH), MNIT led a cloud migration initiative for MDH's application portfolio, shifting many services to AWS infrastructure over approximately 20 months.

MNIT has partnered with state agencies on numerous high-profile technology projects:

- MNsure: Minnesota's health insurance marketplace and integrated eligibility system
- SWIFT: The state's financial management system for accounting and procurement, upgraded in 2021
- Minnesota Report Card: Education data and school comparison tools
- Transparency MN: Public portal for state government spending and financial data
- Environmental Apps: Tools including How's My Lake, Minnesota Air, and What's In My Neighborhood for monitoring environmental quality
- Point of Dispensing Tools: Developed in partnership with Minnesota Department of Health during the COVID-19 pandemic

== Oversight, evaluation, and legislative context ==
MNIT publishes annual, quarterly, and special reports to the Minnesota Legislature.

In 2019, there was proposed legislation (SF 1245) which would have abolished MNIT and moved its functions into the Department of Administration, but it did not ultimately pass. The fiscal note for that bill describes proposed reassignments of functions and oversight.

=== Challenges and audit findings ===
The OLA evaluation highlights that state agency satisfaction with MNIT is mixed, citing concerns over clarity of roles, project oversight, and governance. While 83 percent of agencies expressed satisfaction with the technical quality of software applications and 64 percent were satisfied with enterprise services quality, many agencies raised concerns about customer support, timeliness, billing accuracy, and the consideration of agency feedback.

The audit also identified issues with MNIT's oversight of software development projects, citing inconsistent project management and inadequate compliance with state requirements for project approval and independent audits. The troubled 2017 rollout of MNLARS (Minnesota Licensing and Registration System) highlighted these challenges and prompted increased legislative oversight.

The OLA report notes that some consolidation tasks are unfinished and that statutory clarity is needed.

== See also ==
- Government of Minnesota
- List of Minnesota state agencies
- Chief Information Officer
- E-government
