= Rena Moran =

American politician (born 1960)

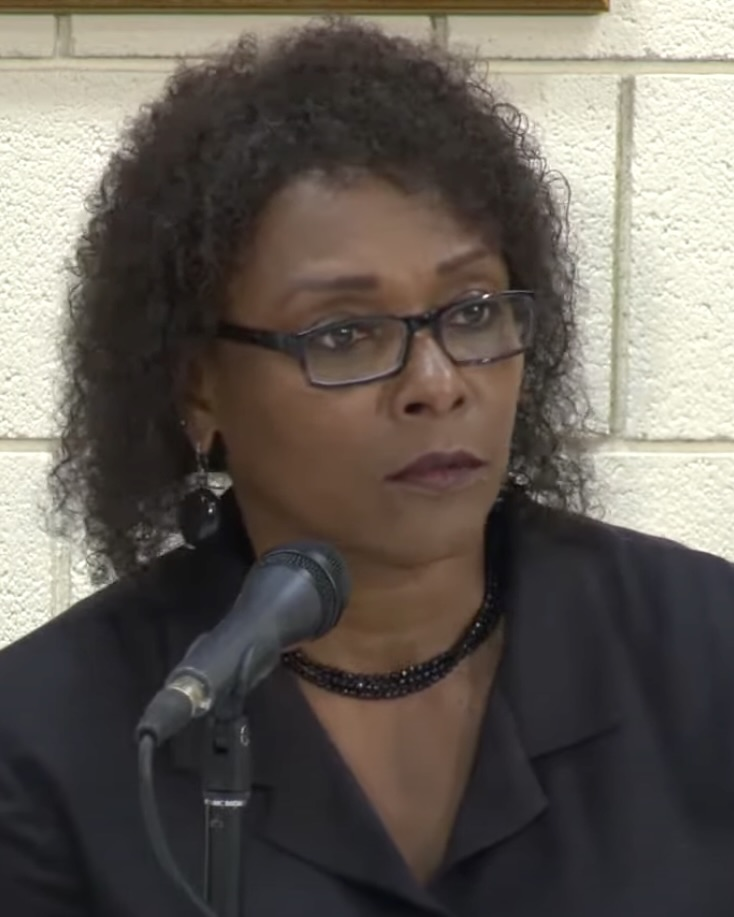
- Moran in 2016

Member of the Minnesota House of Representatives from the 65A district
- In office January 4, 2011 – January 2, 2023
- Preceded by: Cy Thao
- Succeeded by: Samakab Hussein

Personal details
- Born: April 13, 1960 (age 66) Chicago, Illinois, U.S.
- Party: Democratic (DFL)
- Spouse: John Stewart
- Children: 7
- Education: Southern Illinois University
- Occupation: community organizer, educator, legislator

Rena L. Moran (born April 13, 1960) is an American politician and former member of the Minnesota House of Representatives. A member of the Minnesota Democratic–Farmer–Labor Party (DFL), she represented District 65A, which includes portions of the city of Saint Paul in Ramsey County in the Twin Cities metropolitan area. She currently serves as a County Commissioner for Ramsey County (District 4). Her term ends January 4, 2027 and she is running for reelection.

== Early life, education, and career ==
Moran graduated from Southern Illinois University in Carbondale, Illinois, where she received a B.S. in Early Childhood Education. She overcame homelessness when she and her six children first arrived to Minnesota. She worked as a Parent Leader Coordinator for Prevent Child Abuse Minnesota.

== Minnesota House of Representatives ==
Moran was first elected to the House in 2010 and was re-elected in 2012, 2014, 2016, 2018, and 2020. She did not run for re-election in 2022.

In 2017, Moran was honored at the Humphrey-Mondale Awards and received the Joan Growe Award.

== Personal life ==
Moran is married and has seven children.

Minnesota House of Representatives
Preceded by Cy Thao	Member of the House of Representatives from the 65A district 2011–2023	Succeeded by Samakab Hussein
