= Jessi Pierce =

American sports reporter (1988–2026)

Jessi Pierce (September 28, 1987 – March 21, 2026) was an American sports reporter. She was a correspondent with the Minnesota Wild, an NHL team.

== Career ==
Pierce was from White Bear Lake, Minnesota. She graduated from Iowa State University. She started her reporting work with Cyclones' Club hockey program. She covered the Minnesota Wild team for ten seasons for NHL.com. Her writing appeared in many publications including USA Hockey, the Minnesota Hockey Journal, Massachusetts Hockey, The Athletic and the B1G Ice Hockey blog.

== Death ==
Pierce died in a house fire in Minnesota on March 21, 2026, at the age of 37. Her three children, Hudson, Cayden and Avery, also died in the house fire. Her husband, Mike Hinrichs, was out of town for work.
