= Kelly Morrison =

American physician and politician (born 1969)

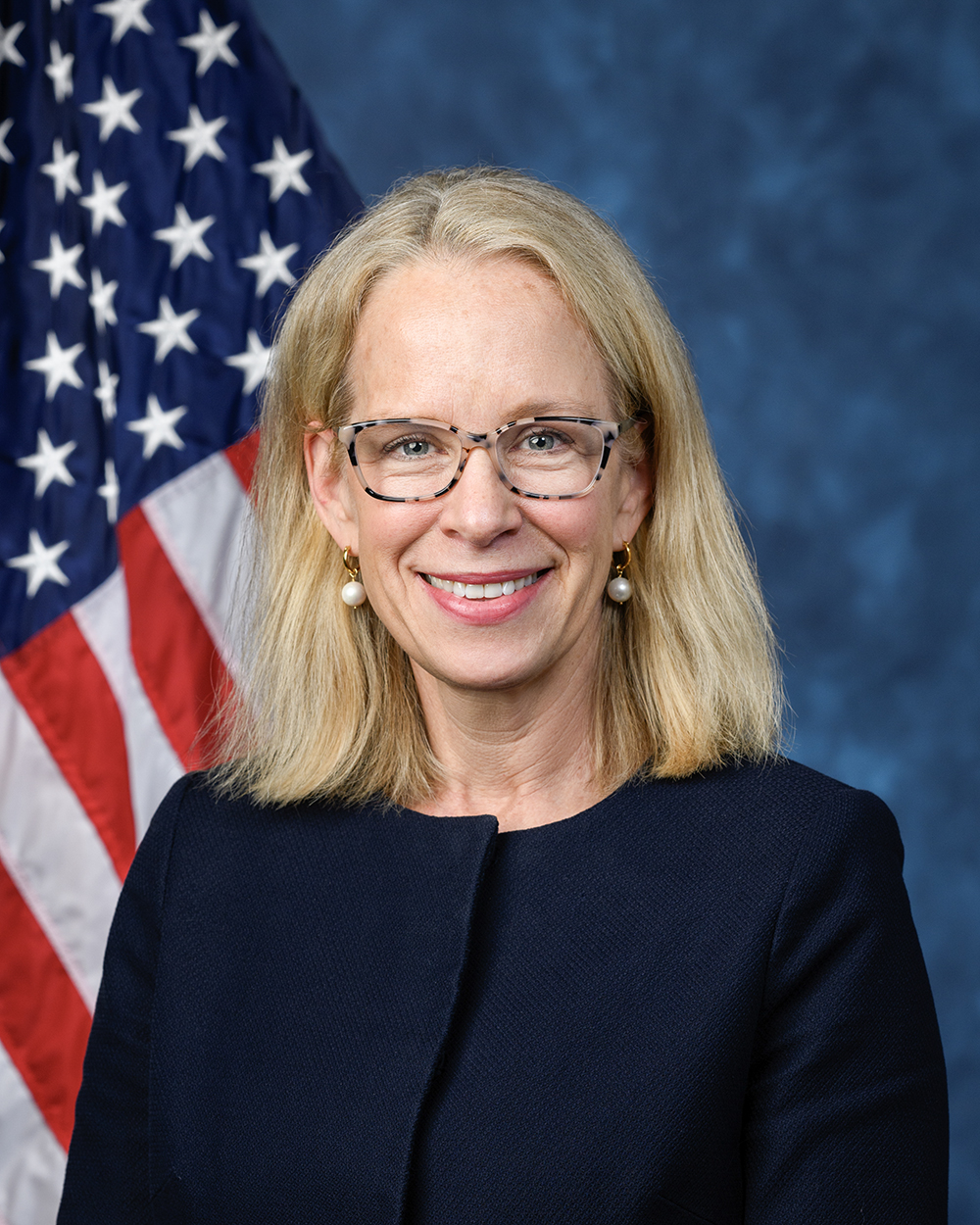
- Official portrait, 2024

Member of the U.S. House of Representatives from Minnesota's 3rd district
- Incumbent
- Assumed office January 3, 2025
- Preceded by: Dean Phillips

Member of the Minnesota Senate from the 45th district
- In office January 3, 2023 – June 6, 2024
- Preceded by: David Osmek (redistricted)
- Succeeded by: Ann Johnson Stewart

Member of the Minnesota House of Representatives from the 33B district
- In office January 8, 2019 – January 3, 2023
- Preceded by: Cindy Pugh
- Succeeded by: Andrew Myers (redistricted)

Personal details
- Born: Kelly Louise Morrison; February 2, 1969 (age 57) Minneapolis, Minnesota, U.S.
- Party: Democratic (DFL)
- Spouse: John Willoughby
- Children: 3
- Parent: John Morrison (father)
- Education: Yale University (BA); Boston University (attended); Case Western Reserve University (MD)
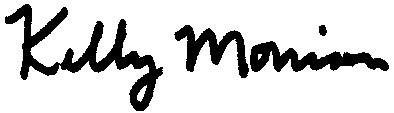
- Signature
- Website: House website Campaign website

Kelly Louise Morrison (born February 2, 1969) is an American physician and politician who has served as the U.S. representative for Minnesota's 3rd congressional district since 2025. A member of the Minnesota Democratic–Farmer–Labor Party, she served from 2019 to 2023 in the Minnesota House of Representatives and from 2023 to 2024 in the Minnesota Senate.

An obstetrician-gynecologist who practiced in Minnesota for more than 20 years, Morrison was elected to Congress in the 2024 House elections, succeeding Dean Phillips, and is the first OB-GYN who supports abortion rights to serve in Congress. In the House, she sits on the Small Business and Veterans' Affairs Committees and is a founding member of the Congressional Doctors Caucus. Her tenure has focused on health care, opposition to the second Trump administration's tariffs and their effect on small businesses, and oversight of federal immigration enforcement in Minnesota.

== Early life, education, and career ==
Morrison was born in Minneapolis, Minnesota. She attended Jefferson Elementary School in Minneapolis and graduated from The Blake School.

Morrison attended Yale University and graduated cum laude with a Bachelor of Arts in history. She attended Boston University for her pre-medical requirements and graduated with a Doctor of Medicine from the Case Western Reserve University School of Medicine.

Morrison is a practicing obstetrician-gynecologist. She practiced medicine in Minnesota for more than 20 years and worked early in her career at a Veterans Affairs hospital.

== Minnesota Legislature ==
=== House of Representatives ===
Morrison was first elected to the Minnesota House of Representatives in 2018, defeating Republican incumbent Cindy Pugh. She was reelected in 2020, defeating Republican nominee Andrew Myers.

Morrison represented District 33B, including portions of Hennepin and Carver counties. During the 2021-2022 session, she served as an assistant majority leader for the House DFL Caucus.

2019-2020 committee assignments:

- Health and Human Services Policy
- Education Finance Division/Health and Human Services Finance Division: Early Childhood Finance and Policy Division
- Environment and Natural Resources Finance
- Water Division

2021-2022 committee assignments:

- Early Childhood Finance and Policy
- Environment and Natural Resources Finance and Policy
- Health Finance and Policy
- Health Finance and Policy: Preventive Health Policy Division

=== Senate ===
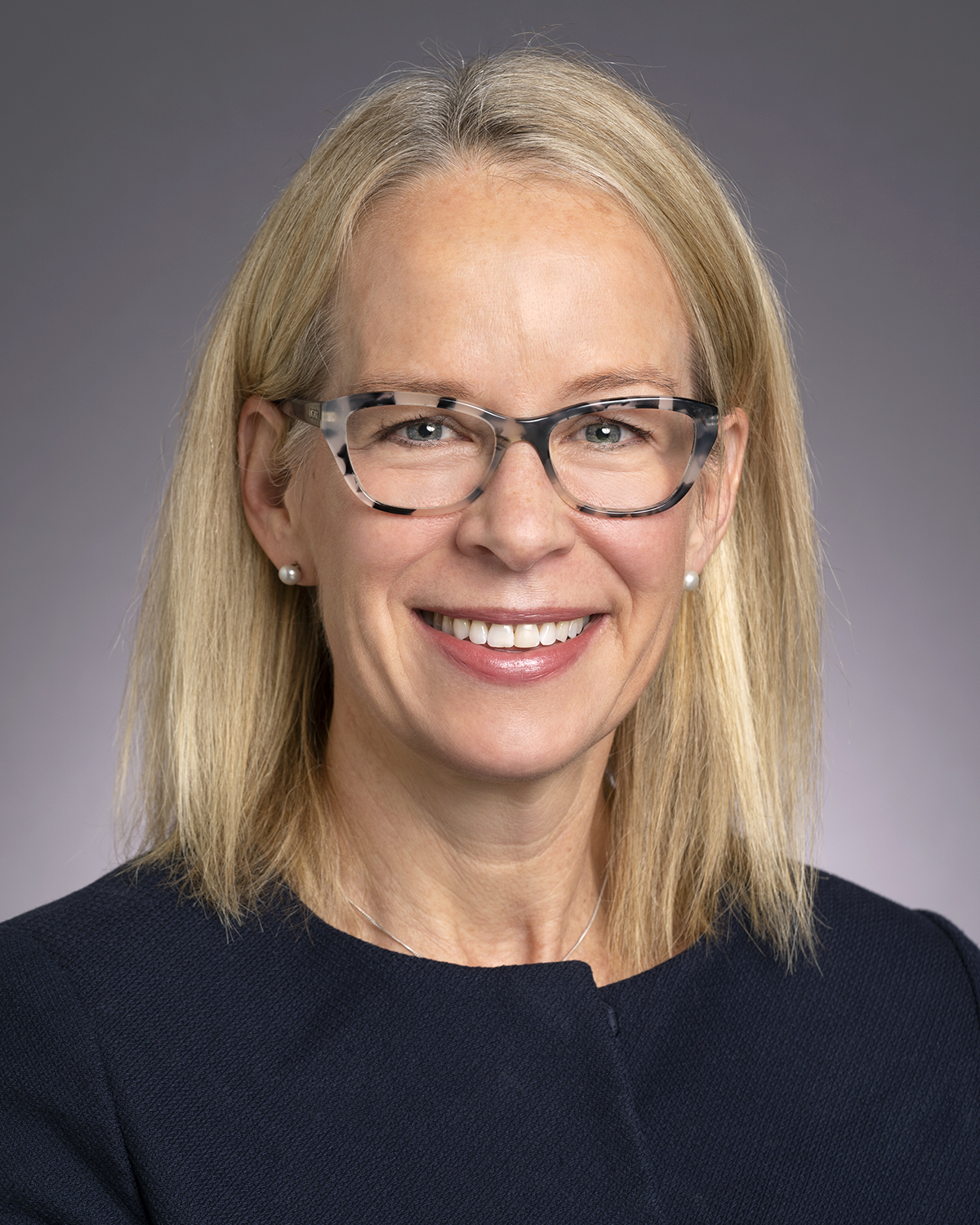
Morrison during her tenure in the Minnesota State Senate, 2023

After legislative redistricting in 2022, Morrison announced she would run for the DFL endorsement in the newly created Senate District 45 in the western Twin Cities metropolitan area, which includes the cities of Minnetonka, Mound, Minnetrista, and Orono in Hennepin County. She was endorsed by Speaker of the Minnesota House Melissa Hortman and U.S. Representative Dean Phillips. Morrison won the party's endorsement over incumbent Senator Ann Johnson Stewart. Stewart announced she would not challenge Morrison in the primary and endorsed her. In the general election, Morrison defeated Republican nominee Kathleen Fowke.

Morrison served as an assistant majority leader for the Senate DFL Caucus during the 2023-2024 session. In 2023, she sponsored legislation requiring every Minnesota public school building to keep doses of naloxone on hand to reverse opioid overdoses. The requirement became law and took effect in the 2023-24 school year.

Morrison resigned from the Minnesota Senate on June 6, 2024, to focus on her 2024 congressional campaign.

2023-2024 committee assignments:

- Vice Chair: Transportation
- Environment, Climate and Legacy
- Health and Human Services
- State and Local Government and Veterans

== U.S. House of Representatives ==
=== Elections ===
==== 2024 ====
On November 9, 2023, Morrison announced she would run in the Democratic primary for Minnesota's 3rd congressional district after the incumbent, Dean Phillips, decided to run against President Joe Biden in the 2024 Democratic Party presidential primaries. Morrison said she strongly supported Biden, calling him a "transformational president".

Morrison and Phillips had endorsed each other in previous races, and Morrison called Phillips "a good friend of hers". Her announcement emphasized her work passing pro-choice legislation and that she would be the only OB-GYN in Congress if elected. Morrison's campaign had been endorsed by several state legislators, former Minnesota Governor Mark Dayton, and a former president and CEO of Planned Parenthood North Central States.

On November 24, 2023, Phillips announced he would not seek reelection to the House regardless of the outcome of his presidential campaign. He also said he would not endorse anyone in the race for his former seat. Morrison thanked Phillips for his service in a statement after his announcement.

A primary was not held after only one candidate per major party filed for office. Morrison won the election on November 5, 2024, 58% to 42% over Republican Tad Jude. She was described as the "first pro-choice OB-GYN elected to Congress".

==== 2026 ====
Morrison is seeking reelection in 2026. She was unopposed for the DFL nomination in the August 11 primary. She faces Republican nominee Tyler Bass, a business owner, in the general election.

=== Tenure ===
Morrison was sworn into the 119th Congress on January 3, 2025. At the start of the session, she joined the House's first Democratic Doctors' Caucus, expressing a hope to form a bipartisan physicians' caucus in the future. She became a founding member of the Congressional Doctors Caucus, launched in March 2025 by six Democratic physicians in the House.

In June 2025, after the assassination of former Minnesota House Speaker Melissa Hortman and her husband, Mark, Morrison led a bipartisan House resolution honoring them and condemning political violence, which passed 424-0. After the 2025 Annunciation Catholic Church shooting in Minneapolis, she joined the Minnesota congressional delegation in introducing a bipartisan resolution honoring the victims. In November 2025, Morrison introduced the Small Business RELIEF Act, which would exempt small businesses from the tariffs imposed by the second Trump administration and refund those already paid.

In early 2026, Morrison was one of 13 members of Congress who sued the Department of Homeland Security over a policy requiring seven days' notice before lawmakers could visit immigration detention sites. After oversight visits an ICE holding site in Minneapolis, in late January and early February 2026, she reported detainees held in leg shackles and sleeping on floors without beds, and said the facility had no formal medical protocols. DHS disputed such descriptions of conditions at the building. In June 2026, she introduced the bipartisan School Access to Naloxone Act with Republican Dave Joyce of Ohio, which would fund grants for K–12 schools to stock naloxone and train staff to administer it.

=== Committee assignments ===
- Committee on Small Business
  - Subcommittee on Contracting and Infrastructure
  - Subcommittee on Rural Development, Energy, and Supply Chains (Ranking Member)
- Committee on Veterans' Affairs
  - Subcommittee on Disability Assistance and Memorial Affairs
  - Subcommittee on Health

=== Caucus memberships ===
- Congressional Equality Caucus
- New Democrat Coalition
- Congressional Freethought Caucus
- Reproductive Freedom Caucus (Freshman Representative)

== Political positions ==
=== Health care ===
Morrison supports abortion rights and has pointed to her work passing abortion-rights legislation in the Minnesota Legislature. She opposed the confirmation of Robert F. Kennedy Jr. as secretary of health and human services, and the Doctors Caucus she helped found was organized after its members jointly opposed his nomination. She voted against the One Big Beautiful Bill Act, a Republican budget bill that she said cut spending on Medicaid and food assistance.

=== Trade ===
A member of the House Small Business Committee, Morrison has criticized the second Trump administration's tariffs for their effect on small businesses. In April 2025, she wrote to Commerce Secretary Howard Lutnick and Treasury Secretary Scott Bessent asking that small businesses be exempted, and that November, she led a letter from 18 House Democrats urging Speaker Mike Johnson to allow a floor vote on Senate-passed resolutions to end the tariffs.

=== Gun control ===
At a town hall in September 2025, following the Annunciation shooting, Morrison pledged to support a federal ban on assault weapons and high-capacity magazines. She also pledged to support a federal red flag law.

== Electoral history ==
2018 Minnesota State Representative - House 33B
Party	Candidate	Votes	%	±%
Democratic (DFL)	Kelly Morrison	11,786	50.43	
Republican	Cindy Pugh (Incumbent)	11,570	49.50	

2020 Minnesota State Representative - House 33B
Party	Candidate	Votes	%	±%
Democratic (DFL)	Kelly Morrison (Incumbent)	14,202	50.52	
Republican	Andrew Myers	13,889	49.41	

2022 Minnesota State Senator - District 45
Party	Candidate	Votes	%	±%
Democratic (DFL)	Kelly Morrison	27,222	56.27	
Republican	Kathleen Fowke	21,128	43.67	

2024 Minnesota's 3rd congressional district election
Party	Candidate	Votes	%
Democratic (DFL)	Kelly Morrison	240,209	58.4
Republican	Tad Jude	170,427	41.5
Write-in		504	0.1
Total votes		411,140	100.0
Democratic (DFL) hold			

== Personal life ==
Morrison and her husband, John Willoughby, have three children. She resides in Deephaven, Minnesota. She is a member of Trinity Episcopal Church in Excelsior, Minnesota.

U.S. House of Representatives
Preceded by Dean Phillips	Member of the U.S. House of Representatives from Minnesota's 3rd congressional district 2025–present	Incumbent
U.S. order of precedence (ceremonial)
Preceded by Tim Moore	United States representatives by seniority 408th	Succeeded by Johnny Olszewski
