= 2017 Saint Paul mayoral election =

- November 7, 2017
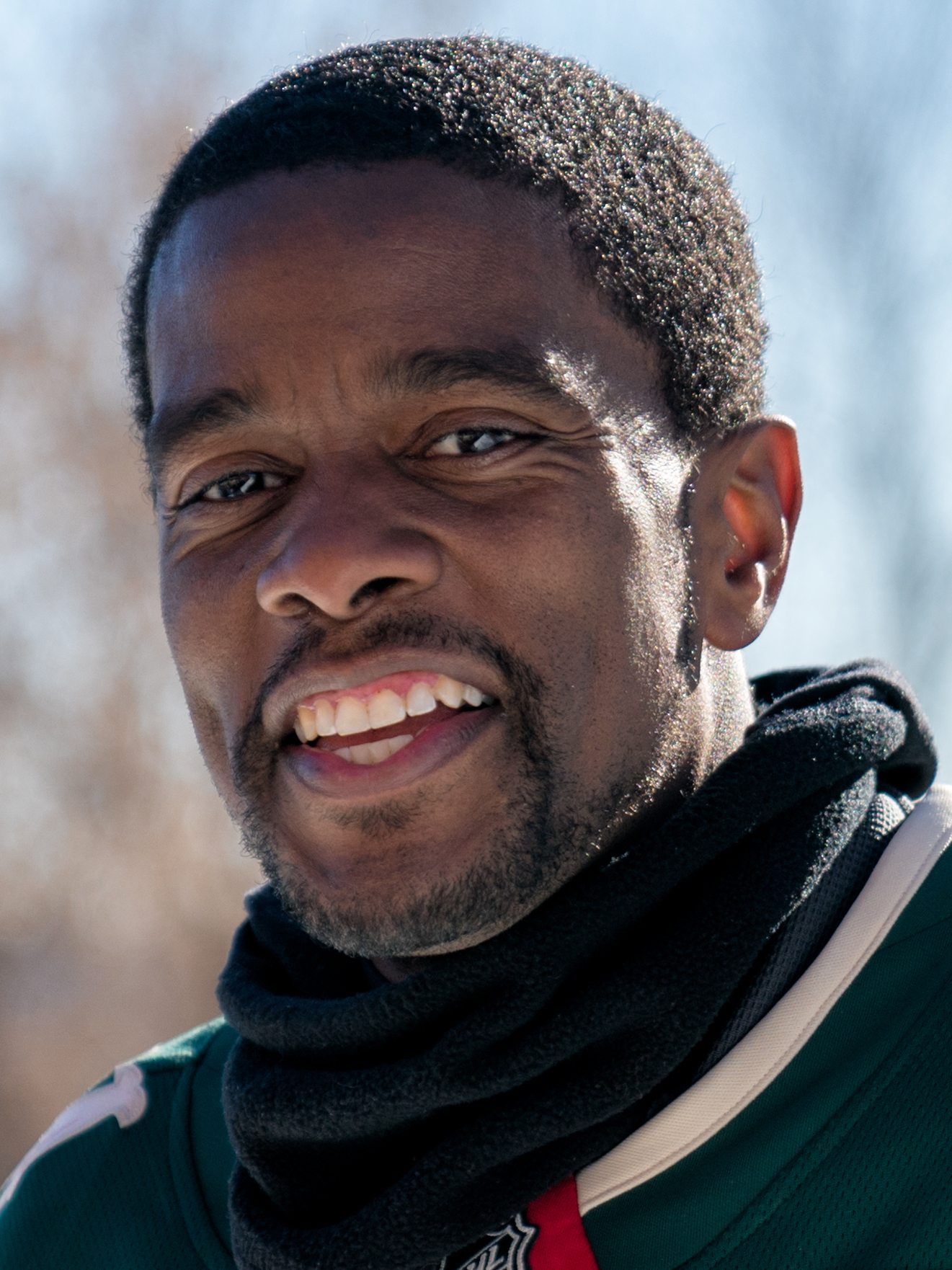

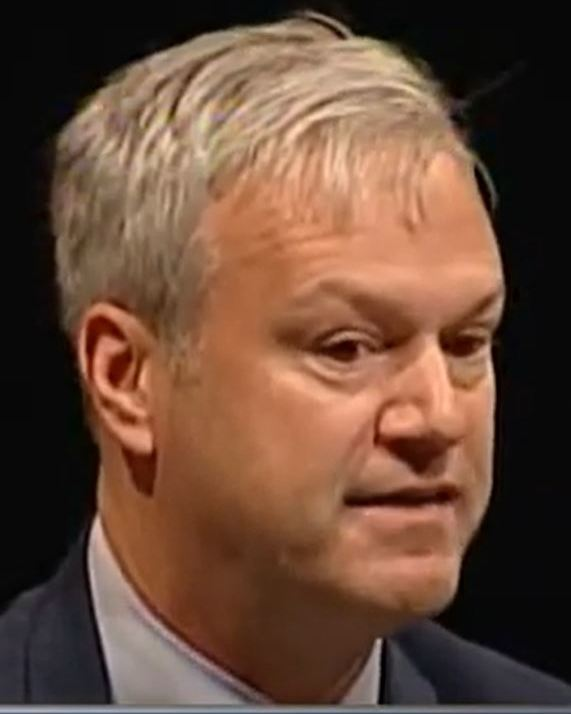

Candidate	Melvin Carter III	Pat Harris	Dai Thao
Party	Democratic (DFL)	Democratic (DFL)	Democratic (DFL)
Popular vote	31,353	15,281	7,590
Percentage	50.86%	24.79%	12.31%
- Results by city council district Carter: 30–40% 40–50% 50–60% 60–70% Thao: 30–40%
Mayor before election
Chris Coleman
Democratic (DFL)
Elected mayor
Melvin Carter III
Democratic (DFL)

The city of St. Paul, Minnesota held an election on November 7, 2017, to elect its next mayor, which was won by city councilman Melvin Carter III. Chris Coleman, who had served as mayor from 2006, did not run for a fourth term and instead planned to run for Governor of Minnesota in 2018. This was the second mayoral election in St. Paul to use ranked-choice voting. Municipal elections in Minnesota are non-partisan, although candidates can identify with a political party.

== Candidates ==
- Melvin Carter III, DFL, former city council member, director of the Office of Early Learning, Minnesota Department of Education
- Elizabeth Dickinson, Green, environmental advocate, 2005 mayoral candidate
- Tom Goldstein, DFL, former St. Paul School Board member, 2015 city council candidate, small business owner
- Pat Harris, DFL, former city council member and government banking specialist at BMO Harris Bank
- Tim Holden, nonpartisan, 2013 mayoral candidate, small business owner
- Dai Thao, DFL, city council member

=== Declined to run ===
- Kristin Beckmann, deputy mayor
- Amy Brendmoen, city council member
- Chris Coleman, mayor
- Erin Dady, former mayoral chief of staff
- Tim Mahoney, state representative
- Erin Murphy, state representative

== Results ==
Candidate	Party	Votes	%
Melvin Carter III	Democratic–Farmer–Labor Party	31,353	50.86
Pat Harris	Democratic–Farmer–Labor Party	15,281	24.79
Dai Thao	Democratic–Farmer–Labor Party	7,590	12.31
Elizabeth A. Dickinson	Green Party	2,927	4.75
Tom Goldstein	Democratic–Farmer–Labor Party	2,360	3.83
Chris Holbrook	Independent	854	1.39
Sharon Anderson	Independent	487	0.79
Tim Holden	Independent	446	0.72
Trahern Crews	Independent	162	0.26
Barnabas Joshua Yshua	Independent	94	0.15
Write-in		92	0.15
Total		61,646	100.00
