= Ballot exhaustion =

Wasted vote under instant-runoff voting

In ranked-choice voting, by method of single transferable or instant-runoff voting, ballot exhaustion occurs when a voter's ballot can no longer be counted, because all candidates on that ballot have been eliminated from an election.

Contributors to ballot exhaustion include:

1. Voter exhaustion (i.e. time or effort constraints),
2. Protest votes intended to oppose all unranked candidates,
3. Strategic truncation,
4. Jurisdictions that impose limits on how many preferences voters can express,
5. The elimination of popular candidates who have many 2nd, 3rd, etc. preferences in the early stages of a vote.

This may occur because the voter chooses not to fill out a complete preference ranking, or because the ballot format itself limits the number of preferences that may be expressed. This results in "exhausted" or "inactive" ballots. For example, in Minneapolis, the city limits voters to 3 rankings of candidates on ballots for city elections.
