= Melvin Carter (politician) =

American politician, former mayor of Saint Paul, Minnesota

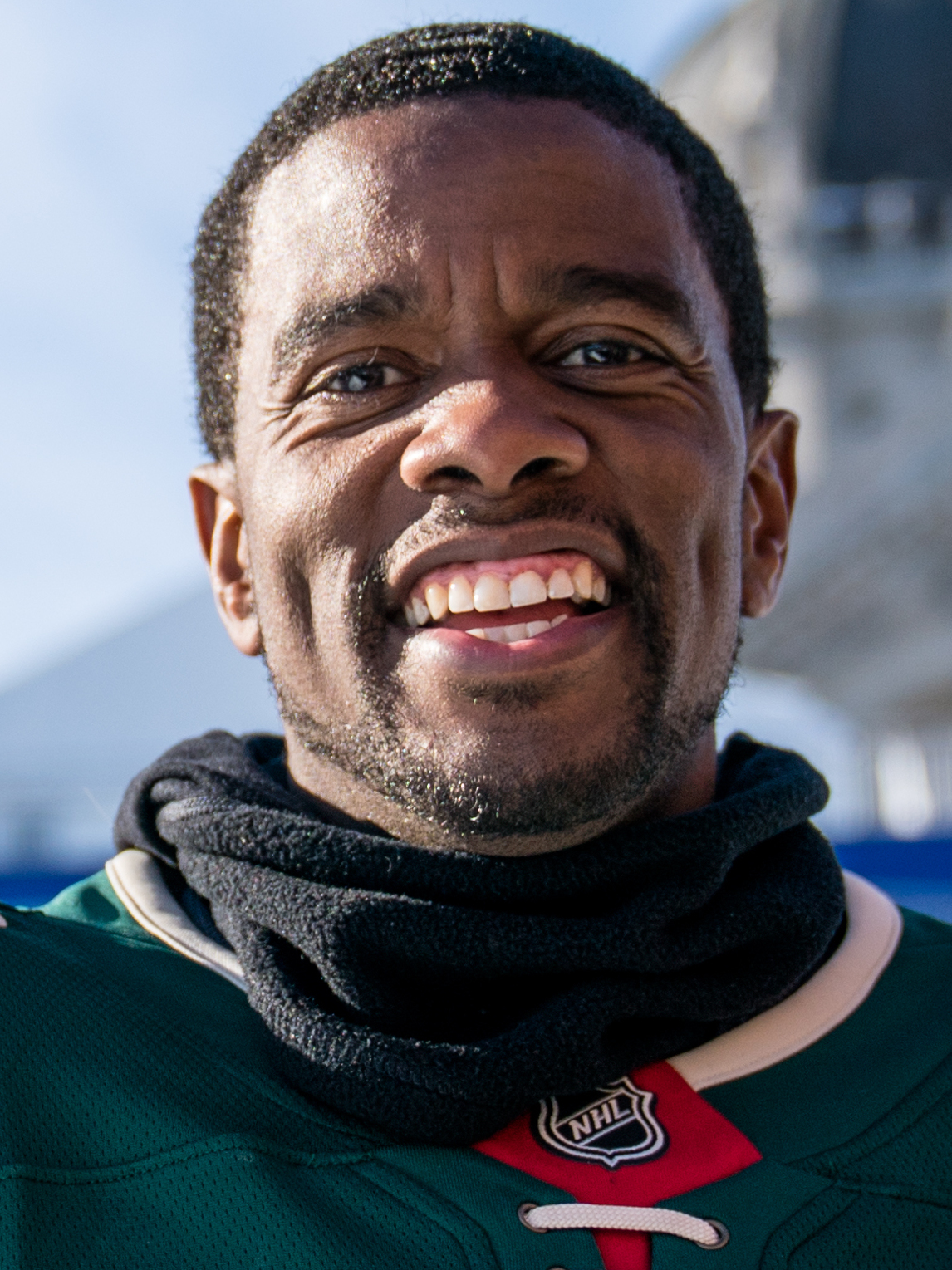
- Carter in 2018

54th Mayor of St. Paul
- In office January 2, 2018 – January 2, 2026
- Preceded by: Chris Coleman
- Succeeded by: Kaohly Her

Member of the Saint Paul City Council from the 1st ward
- In office January 8, 2008 – July 5, 2013
- Preceded by: Debbie Montgomery
- Succeeded by: Dai Thao

Personal details
- Born: Melvin Whitfield Carter III; January 8, 1979 (age 47) Saint Paul, Minnesota, U.S.
- Party: Democratic (DFL)
- Spouse: Sakeena Futrell
- Education: Florida A&M University (BS); University of Minnesota (MPP)
- Website: Campaign website

Melvin Whitfield Carter III (born January 8, 1979) is an American politician who was the 55th mayor of Saint Paul, Minnesota. Elected to his first term in 2017 and reelected in 2021, Carter was St. Paul's first African American mayor. His mayoralty ended on January 2, 2026. Carter supported raising the city's minimum wage to $15 per hour. He is one of 11 U.S. mayors who co-founded Mayors Organized for Reparations and Equity, a coalition of municipal leaders dedicated to starting pilot reparations programs in their cities.

== Early life and education ==
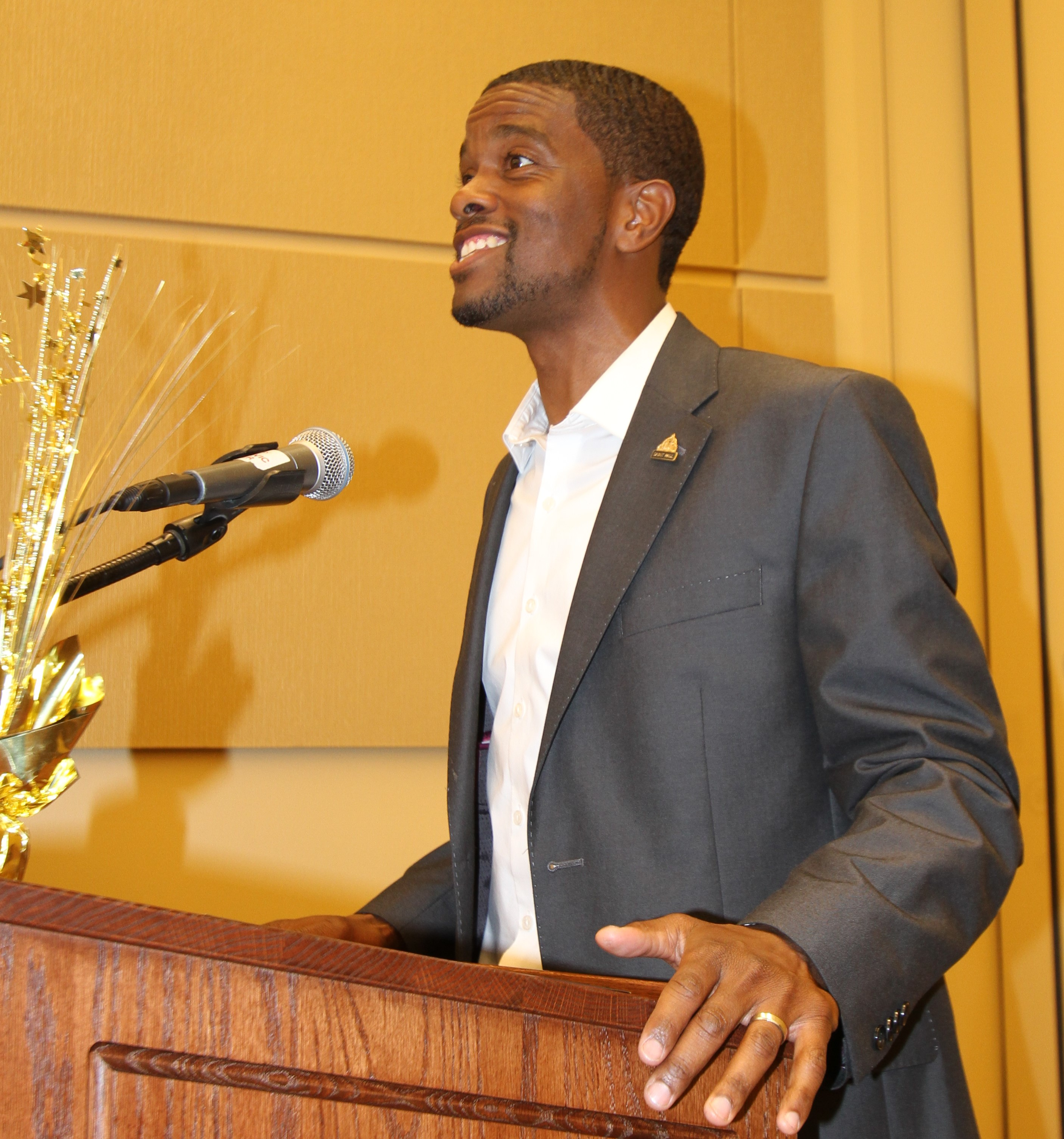
Carter in 2018

Carter was born in Saint Paul's Rondo neighborhood. He is the son of Melvin Whitfield Carter Jr., a retired Saint Paul police officer, and Toni Carter, a Ramsey County commissioner. Carter is a fourth-generation Saint Paul resident. Carter still lives in the Rondo neighborhood where he was raised, along with his wife, Sakeena Futrell-Carter, and their children. He participated in the University of Minnesota Talented Youth in Mathematics Program (UMTYMP) in junior high and high school, and graduated from Saint Paul Central High School. Carter led the school to a 3rd-place finish at the 1997 state track meet, winning the 100-meter, 200-meter, and 400-meter races and finishing second in the long jump.

Carter earned a bachelor's degree in business administration from Florida A&M University. During his time there, he became a brother of Alpha Phi Alpha fraternity. Carter earned a Master of Public Policy from the Humphrey School of Public Affairs of the University of Minnesota.

== Career ==
Carter was a Saint Paul City Council member from 2008 to 2013 and a vice chair of the council. He also was an adjunct faculty member at the University of Minnesota-Duluth, teaching graduate-level classes on campaigns and elections. After his tenure, he was appointed as Director of the Office of Early Learning within the Minnesota Department of Education. He took this position in the summer of 2013.

=== Early career ===
As a city council member, Carter helped create the Department of Human Rights & Equal Economic Opportunity. He also sponsored legislation including Ban the Box, requiring landlord notification of foreclosure, and banning the sale of candy cigarettes. In 2010, he established the Saint Paul Promise Neighborhood, which brought together the community and government to promote better education quality in schools. In 2008, he was listed in Ebony magazine’s 30 Under 30. In 2011, he received a Barbara Jordan Leadership Award from the National Young Elected Officials Network.

=== Mayor of St. Paul ===
During his tenure as mayor, Carter was instrumental in raising the city's minimum wage to $15 per hour. He also established the Office of Financial Empowerment. He launched CollegeBound Saint Paul, the city's college savings account program, and the People's Prosperity Pilot, a guaranteed income program that gives 150 families $500 per month for 18 months. His administration's slogan is "Building a city that works for us all means we all must do the work."

In November 2025, he lost reelection to Kaohly Her.

== Issues ==
=== Housing ===
Carter introduced The Housing Trust Fund as a way to address affordable housing in St. Paul. This program was directed toward low- and middle-income residents and provided them with stabilized and affordable housing options. Carter also introduced The Families First Housing Pilot, which gave certain families financial assistance with rent and services to maintain their housing. This program has a direct partnership with St. Paul Public Schools by providing this assistance to families in need that have children enrolled in those schools. In 2023, Carter added additional funding to an Inheritance Fund that would lend money to homeowners in low- to middle-income neighborhoods and renovate them. The Fund was initially introduced in 2020; its main goal is to ensure that the residents who move into these homes can build their wealth in their homes. Carter has sought to weaken Saint Paul's rent control ordinance multiple times, saying that rent stabilization has stunted home building in Saint Paul.

=== COVID-19 ===
On October 21, 2021, Carter announced a vaccine mandate for all city employees. He gave workers a deadline of mid-January. There was immediate pushback. St. Paul Council member Jane Prince criticized the mandate for lacking a testing option, calling it "the strictest vaccination mandate of any Minnesota municipality". The International Union of Operating Engineers Local 49 and the International Brotherhood of Teamsters Local 120 sued the city in December. A Ramsey county judge ruled for the unions, saying the mandate constituted an unfair labor practice. The mandate was never legally enforced and was officially dropped in October 2022.

On January 12, 2022, in a joint announcement with Minneapolis mayor Jacob Frey, St. Paul announced a framework for a vaccine passport. The mandate required proof of vaccination or a negative test for entering any establishment where food or drinks were served. In line with Minneapolis, St. Paul ended this mandate on February 10.

=== Immigration ===
In 2021, Carter initiated programs directed toward immigrants and refugees in St. Paul. The St. Paul Immigrant Legal Defense Fund provides representation to immigrants who have been detained or are at risk of deportation. This is available for refugees or immigrants who make less than 200% of the poverty line. Carter also introduced Welcoming St. Paul: Immigrant and Refugee Program, a system dedicated to integrating immigrants and refugees into St. Paul with other residents in the city, as well as opening up access to services within the city.

=== Minimum wage ===
In 2018, Carter signed a Minimum Wage Ordinance into St. Paul that raises the minimum wage annually for residents. This took effect in 2020 and continues to rise each year. As of 2023, minimum wage had reached $15/hr for large businesses and $13/hr for small businesses. Effective July 2024, the minimum wage in St. Paul for large businesses will be $15.57/hr for large businesses and $15/hr for small businesses.

=== Other local issues ===
In 2023, Carter proposed an initiative to get rid of $110 million in medical debt for more than 45,000 St. Paul residents. To do this, money from COVID relief funds would go toward the foundation RIP Medical Debt in the 2024 budget. Carter announced in 2018 that he intended to cancel late fees at libraries across St. Paul. Library staff showed Carter the number of St. Paul cardholders unable to check out books due to late fees, which brought about the decision to cancel. It took effect on January 1, 2020. Carter also introduced CollegeBound St. Paul, a fund dedicated to children in the city. Each child receives $50 in a savings account meant for higher education; parents can add more money throughout their lives.

=== Budget proposals ===
In his budget proposal for 2024, Carter focused on crime, infrastructure, and property taxes. This $820.5 million proposal includes $7.4 million to the city's property tax levy, decreasing median family contributions to property tax by $26 per month. A one-time safety aid provided by the state legislature gives Carter $13.6 million, of which he proposes that half go to gun violence initiatives and half to the fire and police departments and recreational facilities to improve safety measures. In November 2023, St. Paul voters approved a sales tax increase Carter had proposed to improve road conditions. He also proposed free swimming lessons for children under 10.

== Appointments ==
=== Chief of police ===
On November 1, 2022, Carter appointed Axel Henry chief of police.

=== Other appointments ===
In October 2022, Carter appointed Jamie Wascalus as director and CIO of the Office of Technology and Communications and Stefanie Horvath as its deputy director and Chief Information Security Officer.

== Elections ==
2017

Carter ran on four major themes: people, places, partnership, and community policing. He fought for a $15 minimum wage, development of the Green Line, and helping open new businesses while removing barriers to investment. He also rallied against a federal immigration policy, and aimed to decriminalize mental health and addiction issues.

Saint Paul Mayoral Election Results (First Choice) - 2017
Party	Candidate	Votes	%
Nonpartisan	Melvin Carter III	31,353	50.86
Nonpartisan	Pat Harris	15,281	24.79
Nonpartisan	Dai Thao	7,590	12.31
Nonpartisan	Elizabeth Dickinson	2,927	4.75
Nonpartisan	Tom Goldstein	2,360	3.83
Nonpartisan	Other candidates	2,135	3.46
Total votes		61,646	100.00

2021

As the incumbent, Carter focused again on building and protecting communities. He also proposed a program to provide guaranteed income to low-income families. Carter focused on community wealth as a whole, advocating for the Office of Financial Empowerment. He also proposed a new budget to address societal and infrastructure needs.

Saint Paul Mayoral Election Results (First Choice) - 2021
Party	Candidate	Votes	%
Democratic (DFL)	Melvin Carter III (incumbent)	36,426	61.63
Nonpartisan	Dino Guerin	7,454	12.61
Nonpartisan	Paul Langenfeld	5,298	8.96
Nonpartisan	Bill Hosko	3,423	5.79
Nonpartisan	Dora Jones-Robinson	2,357	3.99
Nonpartisan	Miki Frost	2,069	3.50
Nonpartisan	Abu Nayeem	1,516	2.57
Nonpartisan	Scott Evans Wergin	355	0.60
Write-in		205	0.35
Total votes			100.00

2025

2025 Saint Paul mayoral election
Candidate	Round 1		Round 2	
Candidate	Votes	%	Votes	%
Kaohly Her	25,884	38.28	32,295	47.76
Melvin Carter III (incumbent)	27,611	40.83	30,418	44.98
Yan Chen	6,522	9.64	Eliminated	
Mike Hilborn	5,815	8.59	Eliminated	
Adam Dullinger	1,619	2.39	Eliminated	
Write-ins	166	0.24	Eliminated	
Exhausted ballots	—N/a		4,904 ballots	
Total	67,617	100.0%	62,713	100.0%

Political offices
Preceded by Chris Coleman	Mayor of St. Paul; 2018–2026	Succeeded by Kaohly Her
