= Site selection for the 1984 Democratic National Convention =

A bidding process to host the 1984 Democratic National Convention selected San Francisco as the location over other bidding cities.

== Host city requirements ==
Democratic Party officials told cities interested in hosting the convention that they needed to provide at least 250,000 square feet of work space, a convention hall with seating for 20,000; 20,000 high-quality hotel rooms; and a $2.5 million financial commitment (to fund the staging of the convention hall, housing of staff, security, transportation, and other needs).

== Summary of bid cities ==
As of March 1982, the Democratic Party was preliminarily considering ten cities: Chicago, Detroit, Houston, Miami Beach, New Orleans, New York City, Philadelphia, San Francisco, and Seattle. By the time that a vote was held for where to hold the convention, the contenders were Chicago, Detroit, New York City, San Francisco, and Washington, D.C.

Bid cities
City	Proposed main venue	Outcome of bid	Previous major party conventions hosted by city	Later major party conventions hosted by city
San Francisco, California	Moscone Center	selected	Democratic: 1920; Republican: 1956,** 1964**	—N/a
Chicago, Illinois	McCormick Place	finalist	Democratic: 1864, 1884, 1892, 1896, 1932, 1940, 1944, 1952, 1956, 1968; Republican: 1860, 1868, 1880, 1884, 1888, 1904, 1908, 1912, 1916, 1920, 1932, 1944, 1952, 1960; Progressive: 1912, 1916	Democratic: 1996, 2024
Detroit, Michigan	Joe Louis Arena and Cobo Hall	finalist	Republican: 1980	—N/a
New York City, New York	Madison Square Garden	finalist	Democratic: 1868, 1924, 1976, 1980	Democratic: 1992; Republican: 2004
Washington, D.C.	Washington Convention Center	finalist	—N/a	Republican: 2020
Houston, Texas	Astrodome	non-finalist	Democratic: 1928	Republican: 1992, 2028
Kansas City, Missouri		non-finalist	Democratic: 1900; Republican: 1928, 1976	—N/a
Miami Beach, Florida	Miami Beach Convention Center	non-finalist	Democratic: 1972; Republican: 1968, 1972	—N/a
New Orleans, Louisiana	Louisiana Superdome	non-finalist	—N/a	Republican: 1988
Philadelphia, Pennsylvania		non-finalist	Democratic: 1936, 1948; Republican: 1856, 1872, 1900, 1940, 1948; Whig: 1848	Democratic: 2016; Republican: 2000
Seattle, Washington	Kingdome	non-finalist	—N/a	—N/a
**Conventions held in Daly City, California, a municipality adjacent to San Francisco

== Bid details ==
=== San Francisco ===
San Francisco was broadly considered the front-runner to receive the convention due in large part to the fact that the chairman of the Democratic National Committee, Charles Manatt, was a Californian, and heavily supported San Francisco's bid. Mannatt argued that locating a convention in California could be wise for Democrats with an eye to the general election in the state, since California was a state that had a 5–3 Democratic advantage in party registration but had voted Republican for the past several presidential elections. California's largest city, Los Angeles (Mannatt's home city) was logistically unavailable to host the convention due to its hosting of 1984 Summer Olympics. State Democratic Party Chairwoman Nancy Pelosi was another strong booster of San Francisco's bid. San Francisco Mayor Dianne Feinstein had been initially hesitant to bid for the convention, expressing concern about cost, before throwing her support behind a bid.

San Francisco's proposed venue, its new downtown Moscone Center convention center, had 650,000 square feet of space and promised to be capable of seating 20,000 conventiongoers. Additionally considered positives for San Francisco's prospects was that California had the most Electoral College votes, and it had a female mayor (Feinstein). Some considered a concern disadvantaging San Francisco's bid to be the prospect that splinter groups might put on disruptive demonstrations during the convention, particularly that the city's large population of homosexuals might "embarrass" the Democratic Party by holding a large gay rights demonstration. Another factor speculated to disadvantage San Francisco's bid was the small size of its police force.

The Moscone Center was regarded to possibly need alterations to raise its ceiling height in order to accommodate the needs of a convention. While San Francisco's bid was centered upon Moscone Center, Democratic Party officials had also expressed interest in instead having a San Francisco-area convention at the Oakland Arena with additional use of the Kaiser Center for the Arts (both in Oakland). However Moscone Center held an advantage of being in Downtown San Francisco, nearer to a greater share of the Bay Area's first-class hotel rooms.

=== Chicago ===
The biggest factor disadvantaging Chicago's bid was regarded to be the memory of disorder during the 1968 Democratic National Convention in the city. This was Chicago's first serious attempt to receive hosting rights to a major party nominating convention since then. Chicago bid presenters indicated that the city hoped to host a convention that would overwrite the negative memories of the 1968 affair. As part of their bid presentation, Chicago's police chief Richard J. Brzeczek promised the Democratic Party that the Chicago Police Department had undergone significant reforms in the fifteen years since, operating now with a new philosophy that would be more cognoscente towards the civil rights of convention posters.

Chicago was regarded to have adequate facilities for a convention. Chicago's chances of securing the convention were believed to stand to greatly benefit if the site selection team had decided Moscone Center to be an inadequate venue.

=== Detroit ===
Early into Detroit's bid, the suburban Silverdome stadium was floated as a potential venue. However, the city's final bid placed the convention in Joe Louis Arena and Cobo Hall.

Detroit's hotel capacity and arena was regarded as having only just barely accommodated the Republican National Convention it hosted in 1980. With the Democratic convention having more delegates and alternates than the Republican convention, this created concern that the city's facilities could not properly accommodate it.

=== New York City ===
New York City hosted the previous two Democratic National Conventions. Its bid was considered to be hampered by a disinterest among Democratic Party officials in holding a third consecutive convention there. Additionally, Madison Square Garden had been perceived during the previous two conventions to have insufficient floorspace, and the 1984 convention was to feature an even larger number of delegates than the previous two conventions had had.

In pitching New York, Mayor Ed Koch highlighted the city's 100,000 available hotel rooms.

=== Washington, D.C ===
Washington, D.C.'s bid was the city's first attempt to receive the hosting rights to a major party nominating convention. This came after the city opened a new convention center, giving it a facility capable of potentially accommodating a major party nominating convention.

=== Houston, Texas ===
Houston's bid proposed utilizing the Astrodome and nearby Astrohall as the main venues of the convention, which created some uncertainty due to possible scheduling conflicts with the venue's Major League Baseball tenant: the Houston Astros. A logistical challenge of a convention in Houston was expected to be the great distance between many of the city's large hotels and the Astrodome. Additionally, the city's hot and humid summer weather was considered less-than-attractive for a convention.

The bid was backed by Houston Mayor Kathy Whitmire, herself an involved member of the Democratic Party. Houston's bid marked the first time in many years that the city had been interested in pursuing a political convention. In past years, local officials had opposed hosting a convention, often citing concerns over the availability of the Astrodome, security, whether the city had enough hotel rooms, and the great effort it would take to stage a convention in the city. While he supported the bid, Bob Slagle (chairman of the Democratic Party of Texas) believed that Houston would have a greater chance of hosting the 1988 convention, by which time the city was expected to have finished construction on a downtown convention center and significant mass transit improvements.

One aspect regarded to be a positive for Houston's bid was that television networks would have easy logistics, being easily able to transport their equipment between the Democratic convention and the Republican convention (already scheduled to be held in the Texas city of Dallas). Another was recent Democratic successes in the 1982 elections, including a victory in the gubernatorial election. This stood in contrast to Democratic losses in both the 1982 California gubernatorial election and United States Senate election. However, the leaders of the Democratic National Committee and the Democratic Party of Texas had recently come into tension over several concerns, which was considered a possible mark against the city's prospects of being selected as the convention host.

=== Miami Beach ===
While Miami Beach was regarded to have good facilities for a convention, its summer weather was considered a negative mark against it as a convention location.

=== New Orleans ===
New Orleans' bid proposed hosting a convention at the Louisiana Superdome. New Orleans was hosting the Louisiana World Exposition during summer 1984, but its bid's backers promised that the city would be able to accommodate holding the convention coincidently with one week of the exposition. However, the executive director of the city's Tourist and Convention Bureau argued that the city would be better suited to host in 1988.

The city was expected to have 22,000 hotel rooms by the time of the convention, with 10,000 being within walking distance of both the World's Fair grounds and the Louisiana Superdome.

New Orleans' hot and humid summer weather was regarded to be a negative.

== Site selection vote ==
On April 23, 1983, San Francisco was awarded hosting rights to the convention, receiving 23 out of 27 votes on second-ballot vote by the Democratic Party's site selection committee. The city had fallen one vote short of securing the needed majority vote on the first ballot.

This marked the second time that a Democratic National Convention was held in the city of San Francisco, with the 1920 edition having been held at the city's Civic Auditorium. It was the party's third convention to be held in California, after the 1920 convention and the 1960 convention in Los Angeles. This also marked the first Democratic National Convention to be hosted on the West Coast since 1960. The Democrats' choice of San Francisco, paired with the Republican Party's earlier selection of Dallas, Texas for their convention, meant that, for the second time ever (after only the 1928 United States presidential election), both parties hosted their nominating conventions in cities west of the Mississippi River.

Site selection committee vote
City	Round 1	Round 2
San Francisco, California	13	23
Chicago, Illinois	3	2
Detroit, Michigan	4	1
New York City, New York	2	1
Washington, D.C.	5	0
