= 1924 Farmer–Labor National Convention =

1924 Farmer-Labor National Convention
- 1924 presidential election

Convention
- Date(s): June 17–19
- City: Saint Paul, Minnesota
- Venue: Municipal Auditorium

Candidates
- Presidential nominee: Duncan McDonald of Illinois
- Vice-presidential nominee: William C. Bouck of Washington
- Results (president): acclamation
- Results (vice president): acclamation

The 1924 Farmer–Labor National Convention was held June 17–19 at the Municipal Auditorium in Saint Paul, Minnesota. By the time of the convention, the national Farmer–Labor Party had fractured and been reduced to a rump. The convention nominated Duncan McDonald and William C. Bouck as provisional nominees, with the understanding that the party's executive committee might withdraw its own ticket if it was pleased with the nominees of the July convention organized by the Conference for Progressive Political Action (CPPA). After the CPPA convention nominated Robert M. La Follette for president, the rump Farmer-Labor Party's executive committee withdrew its ticket, but backed the Workers Party (Communist) ticket nominated at the 1924 Workers National Convention instead of La Follette's ticket. Despite the rump national committee throwing its endorsement to the Communists, La Follette is regarded by several sources to have been the presidential candidate that the party supported in 1924.

== Background ==
At the Farmer–Labor Party's 1923 national conference, the Workers Party captured major within over the national party organization (which became sometimes referred to as the "Federated Farmer–Labor Party"). The Worker's Party was the "overground" political party of the Communist Party.

At the national Farmer–Labor Party's March 1924 party conference, a call was issued for a national convention to convene in Saint Paul, Minnesota on June 17, 1924. Soon after, however, pressure was placed on the Farmer–Labor Party to purge itself of Communist and to postpone its next convention until July 4, 1924, so that it might meet jointly with the July nominating convention scheduled to be held by the Conference for Progressive Political Action (CPPA) to be held in Cleveland. On March 18, 1924, National Secretary Jay G. Brown wrote to the National Committee asking for a vote on the question of holding a convention on July 4 at Cleveland. This convention was not called. Brown resigned as National Secretary, to be replaced on a temporary basis by Robert M. Buck, who soon resigned as well. National Chairman W.M. Piggott then appointed Bert Martin as National Secretary, and party's headquarters were moved from Chicago to Denver.

Robert M. La Follette publicly declared, in advance of the convention, that he would not accept any nomination to come out of it. He rejected the support of the Farmer-Labor Party, characterizing it as being captured under the control of Communist interests. La Follette repudiated the party in an open letter published by his presidential campaign on May 26, admonishing the Communist involvement in the party, and deeming the Communists to be "mortal enemies of the Progressive movement and democratic ideals. Further reputation by La Follet of the Farmer-Labor Party was contained a letter he wrote to Herman Ekern (attorney general of Wisconsin), which was released to the news media on May 28, 1924.

== Logistics ==
The convention was held June 17–19 at the (since demolished) Municipal Auditorium in Saint Paul. The venue had a seating capacity of approximately 2,000.

Organizers of the convention had anticipated that 2,000 delegates would attend, and a further 10,000 convention visitors would come to Saint Paul. However, convention attendance was dampened by La Follette's public declaration he would not accept any nomination of his presidential candidacy that came out of the Farmer-Labor Convention, and the American Federation of Labor's decision to steer clear of the convention (citing its disbelief in conducting direct political action as an organization).

The convention saw attendance by approximately 400 delegates, far less than the predicted 2,000 delegates. Only three state affiliates of the party sent delegations of the convention, rendering 1924 a rump convention. The attending delegations were those from Minnesota, North Dakota and South Dakota. Minnesota sent 142 delegates, while the Dakotas combined sent approximately 90 delegates. The remaining 170 delegates at the convention were not sent by state parties, but rather were delegates allocated to affiliated organizations. These included the Workers Party, Federated Farmer-Labor Party, Amalgamated Clothing Workers (the only large union to participate in the 1924 convention), Woman's Shelley Club of North Dakota, Galesburg Musical Club, Negro Tenants Protective League, People's Voice Culture Club, Housewives' Protective League, Workmen's Gymnastic Association, and National Woman's Party.

Notable figures at the convention included:

- William Mahoney (who called the convention to order)
- William Z. Foster, head of the Workers Party
- Joseph Manley, son-in law and mentee of Foster
- C. E. Ruthenberg, Communist figure
- Duncan McDonald, a representative of the Illinois Labor Party
- Alexander Howat, mining unionist
- Alice Paul, head of the National Woman's Party (attending the convention merely to advocate for the adoption of platform plank calling for absolute gender equality)
- Charles E. Taylor, state senator from Montana who spoke at the convention

On the second day of the convention, committees were appointed. Communists succeeded in getting their members appointed to significant leadership roles on the committees.

== Nominations ==
The party opted to nominated a provisional presidential ticket, with the understanding that the party's executive board would potentially withdraw its ticket and instead support the ticket to be selected by the forthcoming July presidential nominating convention organized by the CPPA if the executive board found that nominee to be satisfactory. The understanding at the time of the Farmer-Labor convention was that, if the CPPA's ticket was not satisfactory, the Farmer-Labor party would carry forward with its own nominated ticket.

Alexander Howat placed Duncan McDonald's name into forward for the presidential nomination. He was the sole name entered, as an attempt by a delegate to nominate La Follette was dismissed due to La Follette's stated intent to reject any nomination from the convention. Furthermore, a non-delegate spectator named Stephen Fay attempted to put himself forward, but this was ruled to be out of order since he was not a delegate and therefore unable to motion for names to be nominated. Only delegates voted in opposition to the nomination of McDonald during the roll call.

William Bouck, of Sedro-Woolley, Washington, was nominated for vice president.

== Subsequent withdrawal of ticket ==
At the convention organized by the CPPA, a ticket headed by Robert La Follette was nominated.

While they had been friendly to the Communists, neither Foster nor Gitlow were a member of the Communist's political party –the Workers Party of America. Dissatisfied with the CPPA's nomination of La Follette, but also not keen to run the provisional nominees of the Farmer–Labor convention as a general election ticket, the Communists chose to organize a presidential nominating convention for the Worker's Party, at which they nominated what was their first-ever presidential ticket. The Workers convention nominated The Workers Party nominated William Z. Foster for president and Benjamin Gitlow for vice president.

The provisional nominees of the Farmer–Labor Party withdrew their candidacies on July 10, with intent of bowing out in support of La Follette's candidacy, as nominated by the CPPA. Later that same day, National Executive Committee of the Farmer–Labor Party voted to approve withdrawing the candidacy of its own provisional nominees. However, instead of endorsing the CPPA's ticket, the National Executive Committee instead voted for the party to endorse the Worker's Party presidential ticket. This was, largely, due to the executive committee of the Farmer-Labor Party having been left a rump after earlier departures, which reshaped it as heavily-partial towards the Communists. To justify its decision, the National Executive Committee released a statement reading,

[The CPPA] had surrendered to La Follette, betrayed the Farmer-Labor masses into the hands of merchants, manufacturers, bankers and rich farmers and thus destroyed the only chance for a united front in the coming Presidential election. The betrayal at Cleveland makes impossible any united front Farmer-Labor campaign. It delivers into the hands of La Follette and the propertied middle classes, whom he represents, large sections of labor. It shows the complete surrender to the labor bureaucracy and the bankrupt Socialist politicians which dominate the C. P. P. A. to La Follette and La Follettism. The united front in the coming campaign, therefore, becomes impossible.

Despite the rump national committee throwing its endorsement to the Communists, La Follette is regarded by several sources to have been the candidate supported by the Farmer–Labor Party in 1924.
