= Sylvester McGovern =

American political commentator (1895–1977)

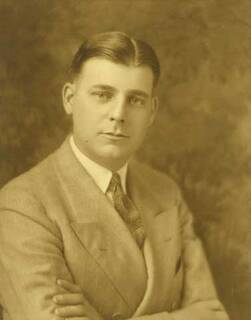
- McGovern in 1935
- Born: July 4, 1895; Northfield, Minnesota
- Died: July 18, 1977 (aged 82); St. Paul, Minnesota
- Political party: Democratic
- Spouse: Helen Marie Dahlstrom
- Children: 4

Sylvester Hubert McGovern (July 4, 1895 – July 18, 1977) was a progressive political commentator and author from Minnesota.

== Early life ==
McGovern was born in Northfield, Minnesota in 1895. He fought in World War I.

== Career ==
McGovern was employed by Floyd B. Olson, despite their differing political affiliations. McGovern worked as a speechwriter, strategist, and advisor to Olson.

In 1934, as governor, Olson attempted to oust opponents in the legislature to pass a mortgage moratorium. To do this, he intended to have McGovern host a radio show to attack opponents leading up to election day. KSTP owner Stanley E. Hubbard agreed to let him broadcast. McGovern began his daily radio show, 'Minnesota Merry Go Round' in January 1935. McGovern used the on air pseudonym 'Rome Roberts'.

McGovern was on air every weekday while the legislature was in session, reporting on its activities, criticizing conservative members. The program gained popularity, given McGovern's oratory skills and satire. McGovern's identity as Rome Roberts was intended to be secret, however it was revealed after two months. First reported as Sylvester 'F.' McGovern, he was attacked by Roy Emery Dunn on the St. Paul Pioneer Press as a shill for oil inspection and rural credit bureaus.

In 1936, McGovern ran for Mayor of St. Paul, Minnesota. He was opposed by incumbent Mark H. Gehan, and competed with former mayor William Mahoney, who was running for a nonconsecutive term, for the labor vote. Gehan won.

In 1940, McGovern ran for governor of Minnesota as a Democrat. McGovern placed last in the primary, with 11.78%.

McGovern died in St. Paul on July 18, 1977 at age 82. He is buried in Saint Mary's Catholic Cemetery in Minneapolis, Minnesota.

== Works ==
- The Minnesota Merry Go-Round - Rome Roberts 1935 Legislature (1935)
- Last Ditch Stand (1959)
