= 1924 Workers National Convention =

- 1924 presidential election
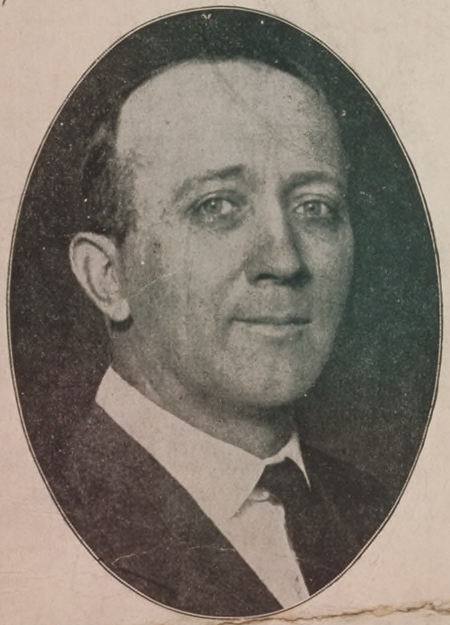
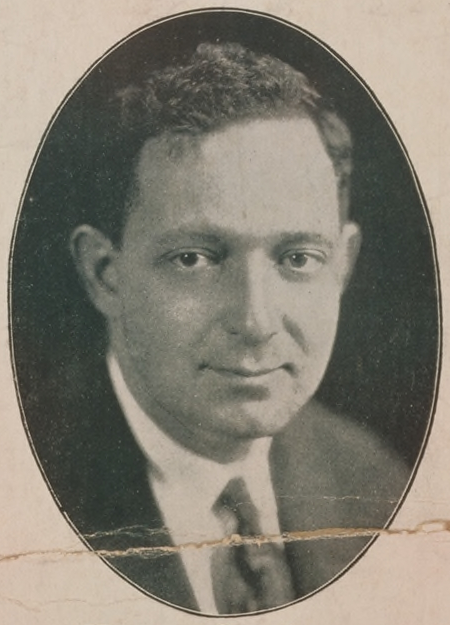
- Nominees (Foster and Gitlow)

Convention
- Dates: July 10, 1924
- City: Chicago, Illinois

Candidates
- Presidential nominee: William Z. Foster of Massachusetts
- Vice-presidential nominee: Benjamin Gitlow of New York

In 1924, the Workers Party of America (the "overground" political wing of Communist Party USA) held a convention where it nominated its first-ever presidential ticket. The nomination of a Communist ticket was motivated by the Communist's dissatisfaction with the campaign of Robert M. La Follette that many other leftist political movements had jointly nominated.

== Background ==
The Workers Party of America was an "overground" political party of Communist Party USA. By 1924, the Communists had also become a major force in the fractured and waning national organization of the Farmer–Labor Party. At the 1924 Farmer–Labor National Convention, provisional nominees (Duncan McDonald for president and William C. Bouck for vice president) were nominated with the understanding that that party's executive committee might withdraw it's nominees and instead endorse the nominee of the July nominating convention organized by the Conference for Progressive Political Action. While both of the Farmer–Labor provisional nominees had been friendly to Communists, neither were involved enough with Communists to have become members of the Workers Party.

Dissatisfied both with the CPPA's backing of La Follette's candidacy but also not keen to support the provisional Farmer–Labor convention as a general election ticket, the Communists organized a single-day nominating convention for the Workers Party on July 10, at which they nominated their first ever Communist presidential ticket.

For the 1924 election, Americans Communists (somewhat reluctantly) adopted policies pushed by the Soviet Communists. This would ultimately harm their standing with many farm and labor groups.

== Nominations ==
A meeting of the National Conference of the Workers Party convened with delegates from cities across the United States. The meeting selected William Z. Foster as its presidential nominee and Benjamin Gitlow as its vice presidential nominee.

== General membership meeting ==
After the nomination proceedings, a meeting of party's general members convened at which the nomination was announced to them by C.E. Ruthenberg (the party's executive secretary). Ruthernberg delivered a speech to the convened party members that lambasted the platform adopted at the CPPA convention as demonstrating a lack of interest in the working classes, declaring that the CPPA platform was not in the interest of workers or most farmers, but rather was geared towards the interests of small industries, the professional class, and the wealthiest of farmers.

== Farmer–Labor Party National Committee endorsement vote ==
On the same day that the Workers Party held its convention, the provisional nominees of the Farmer–Labor Party withdrew their candidacies on July 10. While the Farmer–Labor nominees had done so with the intent of bowing out in support of La Follette's candidacy, the National Executive Committee of the Farmer–Labor Party voted to accept its nominee's withdrawal but to instead endorse the Worker's Party presidential ticket. This was, largely, due to the executive committee of the Farmer-Labor Party having been left a rump after earlier departures, with its remaining membership being heavily partial towards the Communists.
