= Site selection for the 1952 Democratic and Republican National Conventions =

Background to choice of Chicago

Bidding processes were held to select the location of the 1952 Democratic National Convention and 1952 Republican National Convention, with Chicago being selected as the location of both conventions.

While the parties selected the location of their conventions separately, they had expressed advance interest in sharing a convention site in order to lower costs (as they had done for the previous two presidential elections). Six cities formally bid for one or both conventions. By the time the choice for each convention was made, the bidding had narrowed, with only Chicago and Philadelphia being considered. Chicago prevailed in its bid, first securing the Republican convention, and securing the Democratic convention several weeks after that.

== Background ==
Both the Democratic and Republican party selected the locations of their nominating conventions for the 1952 United States presidential election through bidding processes. While neither party had firmly committed to selecting the same host city as the other party, both indicated their interest in doing so to save money. The two parties had held their conventions in the same cities during the previous two elections, with both parties meeting in Chicago in 1944 and Philadelphia in 1948.

The motivation for cities to bid to host the nominating conventions was a belief that the convention visitors generated substantial additional commerce in host cities. Due to the anticipated benefit to local commerce, convention expenses were typically funded through contributions donated by local businessmen.

== Summary of bidding cities ==
Six cities formally submitted bids (Chicago, Illinois; Kansas City, Missouri; Miami, Florida; Philadelphia, Pennsylvania; Los Angeles, California; and San Francisco, California). Initially, Atlantic City, New Jersey and Detroit, Michigan had indicated their interest in hosting, but both abandoned their efforts without submitting a formal bid. Kansas City and Miami only sought to host the Democratic convention, while the four other cities indicated their interest in hosting either or both conventions. Chicago and Philadelphia were the finalist bid cities, with Chicago being selected by both parties.

Finalist bid cities
City	Proposed main venue (capacity)	Previous major party conventions hosted by city	Subsequent major party conventions hosted by city
Chicago, Illinois	Chicago International Amphitheatre (12,000) or Chicago Stadium (20,000)	Democratic: 1864, 1884, 1892, 1896, 1932, 1940, 1944; Republican: 1860, 1868, 1880, 1884, 1888, 1904, 1908, 1912, 1916, 1920, 1932, 1944; Other: 1912 Prog., 1916 Prog.	Democratic: 1956, 1968, 1996, 2024; Republican:1960
Philadelphia, Pennsylvania	Philadelphia Convention Hall (13,000)	Democratic: 1936, 1948; Republican: 1856, 1872, 1900, 1940, 1948; Other: 1848 Whig, 1948 Prog.	Democratic: 2016; Republican: 2000

Other formal bids
City	Previous major party conventions hosted by city	Subsequent major party conventions hosted by city
Kansas City, Kansas –only bid for DNC	Democratic: 1900; Republican: 1928	Republican: 1976
Los Angeles, California	—N/a	Democratic: 1960, 2000
Miami, Florida –only bid for DNC	—N/a	Democratic: 1972; Republican: 1968, 1972
San Francisco, California	Democratic: 1920	Democratic: 1984; Republican: 1956, 1964

Withdrew without formally bidding
City	Previous major party conventions hosted by city	Subsequent major party conventions hosted by city
Atlantic City, New Jersey	—N/a	Democratic: 1964
Detroit, Michigan	—N/a	Republican: 1980

== Details of bids ==
=== Chicago, Illinois (selected by both parties) ===
Chicago cityscape, photographed in 1950

Since hosting the 1860 Republican National Convention, Chicago had established itself as a frequent site of United States presidential nominating conventions. This was in large part due to its relatively central geographic location and its accessibility by railroad. Chicago would remain a frequent convention host until after the 1968 Democratic National Convention, ultimately hosting 25 major party conventions over the course of the 29 presidential elections that took place in that time. Subsequent to 1968, Chicago has been the host city for two further conventions (the 1996 and 2024 Democratic conventions).

Prior to 1860, Baltimore, Maryland had been the most-preferred location for presidential conventions due to its close proximity to the U.S. national capitol of Washington, D. C., where many convention delegates worked. However, with the advent of railways as a dominant mode of transportation, after 1860 Chicago supplanted it. Before 1952, Chicago had previously hosted 19 major party presidential conventions (seven Democratic and twelve Republican). It also hosted the notable 1912 and 1916 conventions of the Progressive/"Bull Moose" Party. It would subsequent to the 1952 conventions go on to be the host of a further five major party conventions (1956 DNC, 1960 RNC, 1968 DNC, 1996 DNC, and 2024 DNC).

Chicago's infrastructure (extensive supply of hotels, dining, and entertainment venues; and its robust transportation) was regarded to make it a strong convention host city. It was noted to have a much easier time accommodating party conventions than cities such as Philadelphia that were comparatively were less physically suited for hosting such sizable events. Cities such as Philadelphia had to make a greater effort to accommodate the logistical needs of such conventions than Chicago did. In their late-April presentation, Chicago offered the availability of accommodations superior to those offered by any of the other bidding cities. Chicago promised that (at minimum) 8,000 first-class hotel rooms in the city's downtown would be available. They also promised that hotel rooms would be available at their standard rates, noting that there was an overall supply of 135,400 hotel rooms in the city. The bid initially proposed use of the 20,000-seat capacity Chicago Stadium arena (recently used by both parties for their 1944 conventions) as the convention hall. However, by May, the proposed venue had shifted to the Chicago International Amphitheatre. Chicago's bid representatives also highlighted that the city was highly accessible from the rest of the nation by passenger rail and passenger airlines.

In its previous conventions of 1944, Chicago had locally raised a total of $350,000 to stage the conventions, of which each convention receiving an equal division of $175,000. However, at the time that the Chicago bid committee first presented its bid in late-April, they offered no specifically financial sum, only making a promise that they would give a definite sum of their financial pledge within two weeks time. The committee noted that they had scheduled a May 2 luncheon to secure pledges and contributions. When layer presenting to the Republicans before their decision on a host city, Chicago’s bid delegation promised that the city could raise as much as $250,000 for a Republican convention if necessary, and could further raise an additional $250,000 if both parties were ton select Chicago (a total sum of $500,000). Chicago had no funds immediately available, but promised to sign "letter of guarantee" (promissory note) to provide funding.

Chicago's initial bid presentations in late-April were delivered by a delegation featuring Illinois DNC committeeman Jacob Arvey, Illinois RNC committeeman Werner W. Schroeder, U.S. Senator Paul Douglas, and Chicago Convention Bureau director Chester A. Wilkins.

Chicago named the weeks of June 30, July 7, and July 20 as weeks in which the city would be able to accommodate national conventions.

=== Philadelphia, Pennsylvania (finalist bid city) ===
Walter Annenberg chaired Philadelphia’s bid committee. In late-April, he made the city's initial presentations to the party subcommittees alongside bid committee's vice chair Frank B. Murdoch. For the presentation to Republicans, they were accompanied by Pennsylvania's RNC committeeman, Mason Owlett. For the presentation to Democrats, they were accompanied by David L. Lawrence (the states DNC committeeman), as well as former U.S. Senator Francis J. Myers and Philadelphia Democratic City Committee chairman James A. Finnegan.

Other prominent individuals publicly had indicated their support for the city's bid effort in advance of the presentations, including Pennsylvania Republican state chairman M. Harvey Taylor, Pennsylvania Democratic state chairman Maurice Splain, Philadelphia Republican City Committee chairman William J. Morrow, U.S. attorney Gerald A. Gleeson, Republican Philadelphia mayor Bernard Samuel, Republican governor John S. Fine, Republican U.S. senators Edward Martin and James H. Duff, Democratic U.S. congressman William T. Granahan, as well as Republican U.S. congressmen Hardie Scott and Hugh D. Scott. Such supporters advanced several arguments about Philadelphia's suitability as a host. One argument was that Philadelphia's strong associations with the American Revolution would give its selection as a host site strong symbolism. Mayor Samuel argued that Philadelphia had extensive transit connections through trunk line railways, airline service, and arterial highways. He especially stressed its convenient proximity to Washington, D.C.

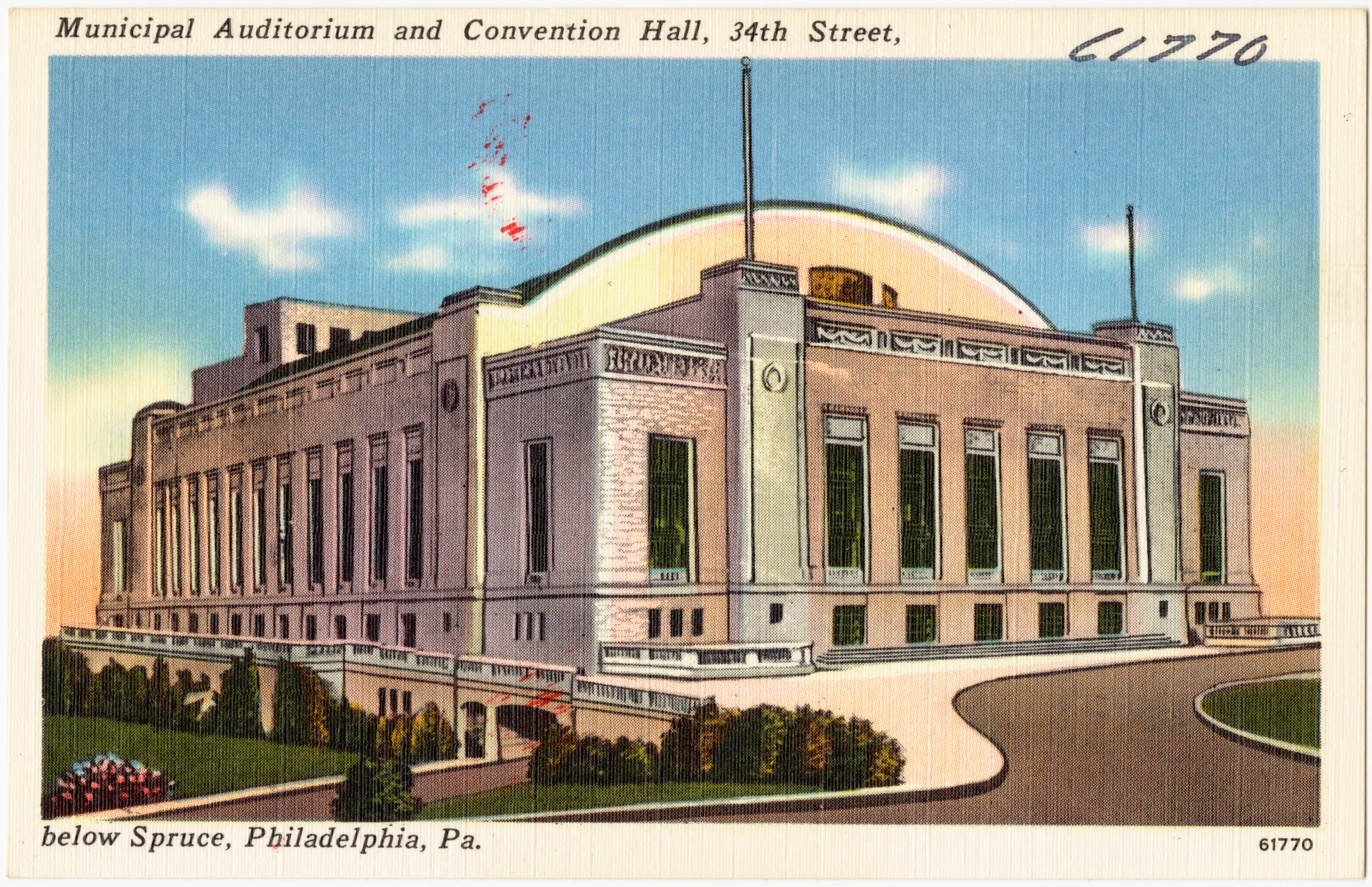
Postcard of the Philadelphia Convention Hall and Civic Center

In its initial late-April presentation, Philadelphia's bid committee promised the availability 6,000 hotel rooms in the city. These would include 4,500 first-class downtown hotel rooms (far fewer than the number of first-class rooms Chicago had offered) and a further 1,500 "good" rooms. This included dormitories at the University of Pennsylvania and Temple University. The committee also promised the availability of an additional 1,200 hotel rooms in the outlying parts of Greater Philadelphia. Unlike Chicago's bid committee, Philadelphia's was unable to assure standard rates for its hotel rooms. Instead, they predicted that hotel rooms would likely be available at 25% to 50% above their standard rates. For a convention hall, they proposed the use of the 13,000-seat capacity Philadelphia Convention Hall and Civic Center, the venue of the 1948 conventions. The presenters also were assisted by Philadelphia convention bureau executive director Ben Shelman.

In 1948, Philadelphia had locally provided a total of $400,000 to fund the conventions, with each party receiving $200,000. In its April 28 presentation to the parties, Philadelphia's bid committee pledged to provide $250,000 per convention (for a total of $500,000 if both parties selected the city). The cost of materials and construction had increased since 1948. In its final presentation to the Republicans in May, Philadelphia increased this pledge to $285,000 in funding, with $250,000 to be immediately given if Philadelphia were awarded hosting rights and an additional $35,000 to be given at a later date. The additional $35,000 would be allocated to fund the staging of entertainment for delegates during the convention. Annenberg argued that Philadelphia was best suited to host the convention in part because it had more coaxial television cables than Chicago. When presenting to Democrats, Philadelphia's committee again promised that it would immediately make $250,000 in funds available to stage the convention, while Chicago was again only promising a "letter of guarantee” to provide funding at a subsequent date.

Philadelphia declared that it would be able to host conventions any point between mid-June and mid-July.

Philadelphia is located on the East Coast of the United States. In 1948, some West Coast Republicans had complained of the travel expenses required for them to attend a convention held on the East Coast. There was some speculation that President Harry S. Truman may personally have preferred a Philadelphia convention over a Republican convention, and that if he had involved himself in influencing the selection process he would have aided Philadelphia's chances

=== Kansas City (submitted bid for DNC) ===
Kansas City, Missouri (the past host of the 1900 DNC and 1928 RNC) bid solely for the Democratic convention.

=== Los Angeles, California (submitted bids for both conventions) ===
Los Angeles' bid committee telegraphed both parties is bid to host one or both convention. Trading on the city's prominent celebrity culture, it promised that conventions in Los Angeles would see "star-studded nights." It also pledged it would raise $200,000 per convention, $400,000 overall if both conventions were held in the city.

Los Angeles is located on the West Coast of the United States. Parties had up through 1952 rarely held their conventions west of the Mississippi River. The Republican Party had only once held a convention west of the Mississippi (their 1928 convention in Kansas City, Missouri), while the Democrats had only done so four times (1900 in Kansas City, Missouri; 1908 in Denver, Colorado; 1920 in San Francisco, California; and 1924 in Houston, Texas). Los Angeles had never previously been the host of a major party presidential convention. It would go on to host two (1960 DNC and 2000 DNC).

=== Miami, Florida (submitted bid for DNC) ===
Miami bid to host the Democratic convention, submitting no bid for the Republican convention. This weakened its prospects, as both parties were highly interested in reducing expenses by sharing a host city. In the era of Solid South politics, Miami's bid committee had no expectation that Republicans would entertain holding their convention in the Southern United States, and therefore opted not to bid at all for their convention.

1950s postcard image of hotels in Miami Beach

Miami's bid was actually a bid for Greater Miami to play host, and would have seen the convention hosted by both Miami and nearby Miami Beach. The delegation that presented Miami's bid to the Democratic National Committee site selection subcommittee included several members of Florida's congressional delegation along with Miami Beach mayor Harold Turk, Miami mayor William M. Wolfarth, Miami city manager Chelsie J. Senerchia, and both cities' directors of publicity.

Miamia's bid committee pledged that it would raise $300,000 to host the Democratic convention. An additional $50,000 would be made available to fund entertainment. It also promised that 15,000 hotel rooms could be made available at standard rates.

Greater Miami had never previously hosted any major party presidential convention. It would go on to host three later conventions (1968 RNC, 1972 DNC, and 1972 RNC).

=== San Francisco, California (submitted bids for both conventions) ===
San Francisco is located on the West Coast of the United States. Parties had up through 1952 rarely held their conventions west of the Mississippi River. The Republican Party had only once held a convention west of the Mississippi, while the Democrats had only done so four times.

San Francisco had been the host of one previous major party convention (1920 DNC). It would subsequently go on to host three further conventions (1956 RNC, 1964 RNC, and 1984 DNC).

=== Atlantic City, New Jersey (withdrew) ===
Atlantic City had initially intended to bid for both conventions, proposing Boardwalk Hall as the main venue and touting the city's hotels. The city had never before hosted a convention, though it had previously sought to. Challenges securing the needed $250,000 to $300,000 in advanced funding was an obstacle faced by its prospective bid.

The city would later go on to host the 1964 DNC.

=== Detroit, Michigan (withdrew) ===
Despite Detroit having been expected to send a delegation to Washington, D.C. to bid, it withdrew at the last minute and instead told each party that it was eager to host their subsequent conventions in 1956. Before it withdrew, its effort had been backed both of Michigan's U.S. Senators (Republican Homer S. Ferguson and Democrat Blair Moody) as well as Detroit convention bureau chief Carl Sedan.

Detroit had never previously been the host of a major party presidential convention. It would later host the 1980 RNC.

== Presentations to site committees ==
On April 28, 1951, six cities presented each party's site committees (subcommittees of each parties' national committees) with formal bids to host one or both conventions. At this point in the bid process, the parties were not asking for the full and final specs of each city's proposals, but rather were merely asking to be provided with key details (including how much money they could promise would be locally fundraised to stage the conventions and how many hotel rooms would be available for use as overnight accommodation by conventiongoers). Both parties had required that their host city be able to provide a sizable meeting hall and a guarantee of between 8,000 and 10,000 hotel rooms.

The six cities that formally submitted bids were Chicago, Illinois; Kansas City, Missouri; Miami, Florida; Philadelphia, Pennsylvania; Los Angeles, California; and San Francisco, California. On April 28, some of these cities (Los Angeles, Kansas City, San Francisco) formally submitted their interest by telegram, while others submitted their interest that day by having delegations meet in-person with the party subcommittees (Chicago, Philadelphia, Miami). Kansas City and Miami only sought to host the Democratic convention, while the four other cities indicated their interest in hosting either or both conventions. The in-person presentations were heard by each party's site selection subcommittees at the Mayflower Hotel. Chicago and Philadelphia were seen as the front-runners in the field bidding to host the conventions. Over the previous 20 years, the two cities had been the most frequent cities to host major party presidential conventions. By the following day, it had been determined by each party that they had narrowed their selection down to the bids received from Chicago and Philadelphia.

While neither party had formally committed to both selecting the same host city as the other party, both had already indicated their interest in doing so to save money. Officials of both parties additionally expressed that they expected all bidding cities to bid for both conventions, rather than seeking only one of them. The two parties had held their conventions in the same cities during the previous two elections, with both parties meeting in Chicago in 1944 and Philadelphia, Pennsylvania in 1948.

The location of the conventions was regarded as having possible impacts on the chances of prospective candidates for each party's nominations. The choice of host city was seen as a possible early proxy battle in the campaign for the Republican nomination. Senator Robert A. Taft of Ohio –one of the leading Republican contenders– was rumored to prefer a Chicago convention. It was rumored that Taft believed Chicago to be a friendlier host city towards his candidacy than Philadelphia. The Chicago Tribune (a major Chicago daily newspaper) supported his candidacy. Taft had a poor track record with Philadelphia conventions, as his two previous unsuccessful presidential candidacies had seen him lose at conventions held that city (the 1940 RNC and 1948 RNC). In contrast, he had seen somewhat better luck in Chicago, as at the 1944 RNC in Chicago (a year in which Taft opted against running) his endorsed candidate (John W. Bricker) secured the consolation prize of the vice presidential nomination. If incumbent president Harry S. Truman were to seek re-election at the Democratic Convention, the location was not expected to have much impact on his chances as he had previously been nominated at conventions in both cities (receiving the vice presidential nomination at the 1940 DNC in Chicago and the presidential nomination at the 1944 DNC in Philadelphia). However, if he forewent nomination, U.S. Senator Paul Douglas of Illinois (a possible candidate) was regarded to have his chances aided by if the convention were held in his home state.

The Republican National Committee scheduled its decision on a host city and convention dates to be made by a vote at its mid-May 1951 meeting in Tulsa, Oklahoma. By late-April, the Democrats had not specifically determined the time or place of their selection vote, only having slated it to occur sometime in late May or early June 1951.

The final presentation of bids for the convention included financial pledges for covering the costs of staging the convention.

== Republican site selection vote ==
Ahead of the Republican National Committee's vote, a six-member site committee met in late-April with representatives from the six cities that had indicated an interest in hosting its convention. The site committee was chaired by Congressman B. Carroll Reece of Tennessee. Other site committee members included Margaret Adams Rockwell of Arizona, Gladys Coffin of the District of Columbia, Martha D. Bauer of Illinois, Irene Peyton of Washington, and Frank J. Sulloway of New Hampshire.

Ahead of the final selection, the sub-committee for the Republican National Committee made it known that they wanted the host city to provide a written guarantee that it would provide $125,000 in convention funding by December 1952; a further $125,000 in funding by March 1, 1952; and a further guarantee to pay for pre-convention meetings of the convention's arrangements committee. On May 10, 1951 the seven members of the Republican Party subcommittee tasked with reviewing bids unanimously voted to recommend that the party select Chicago as host. However, it was clear that Philadelphia would still stage a strong fight for hosting rights ahead of the meeting’s floor vote to decide the host city. The final selection vote was part of a Republican National Committee's May meeting held in Tulsa, Oklahoma, and saw the choice of Chicago ratified.

== Democratic site selection vote ==
On May 25, 1951, the Democratic National Committee met in Denver to select their convention's site.

Chicago argued that by staging the Democratic convention in the same city that would be staging the Republican convention, the Democrats would save $50,000 in expenses. Jacob Arvey made a case that geography dictated it to be "Chicago's turn" to host, due to the previous Democratic convention having been on the east coast. He also argued that Chicago's location away from the coast presented a safe location for the conventions in the scenario that the Korean War escalated further, as Chicago's inland location would insulate it from a foreign attack. Philadelphia mayor Bernard Samuel led the delegation that presented his city’s pitch to the Democrats before their decision. Other members in the city's delegation included Genevieve Blatt.

The Democratic National Committee voted 84–16 to select Chicago as the site of its convention.

== See also ==
- Logistics of the 1952 Democratic and Republican National Conventions
- Television broadcasts of the 1952 Democratic and Republican National Conventions
