= Edward Murphy (Minnesota politician) =

U.S. politician

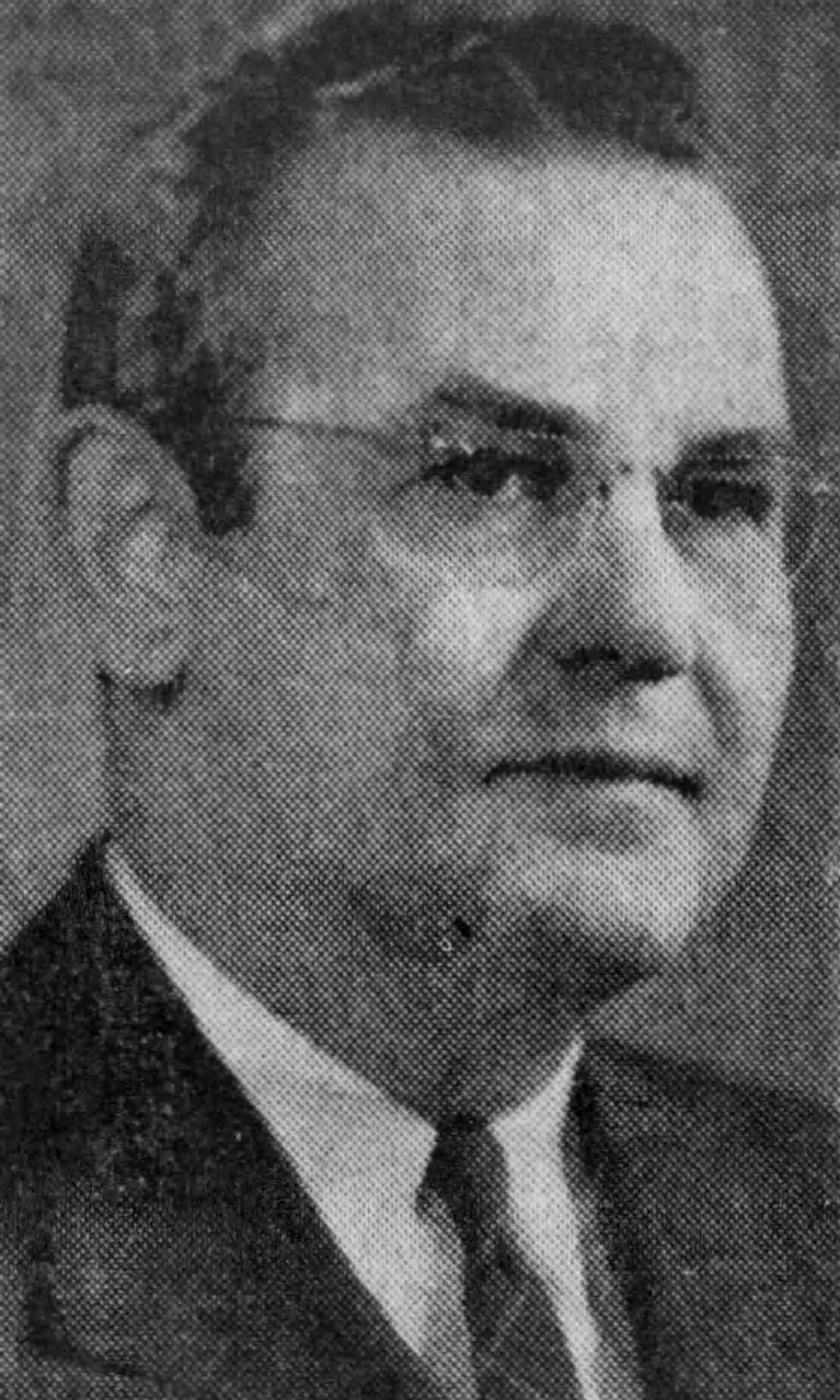
- Murphy in 1940
- Political party: Democratic

Edward Murphy was a U.S. politician from the state of Minnesota. He was an attorney, and was a resident of Saint Paul, Minnesota.

== Career ==
Murphy was an opponent of the 1932 candidacy of fellow Democrat John E. Regan for governor, giving a speech opposing his campaign and urging Democrats to instead support Farmer-Laborite incumbent Floyd B. Olson.

In 1940, Ed Murphy was nominated as the Democratic candidate for Governor of Minnesota. Murphy placed third, with 11.13% of the vote. Murphy, a pro-Roosevelt candidate, won over Theodor S. Slen in an upset victory in the Democratic primary. Murphy was further boosted by an endorsement from congressman Elmer Ryan. However, Murphy found himself unpopular with party leadership. With the Farmer-Labor party falling victim to factionalism, Murphy attempted to consolidate the similarly divided and factional Democratic Party around him. He stated, "If Minnesota Democrats will forget factionalism and petty jealousies, we will become the No. 1 party in Minnesota. I have no feeling against any Democrat or faction of Democrats. I invite and ask co-operation of all. I appreciate the clean, sportsman like campaigns conducted by my three (primary) opponents and their supporters and look forward to their help in November."

Murphy sought office again in 1942, running for U.S. Senate. Murphy performed worse, placing fourth with 10.41% of the vote.

Party political offices
Preceded by Thomas F. Gallagher	Democratic nominee for Governor of Minnesota; 1940	Succeeded by John D. Sullivan
