= Presidential nomination of Robert M. La Follette =

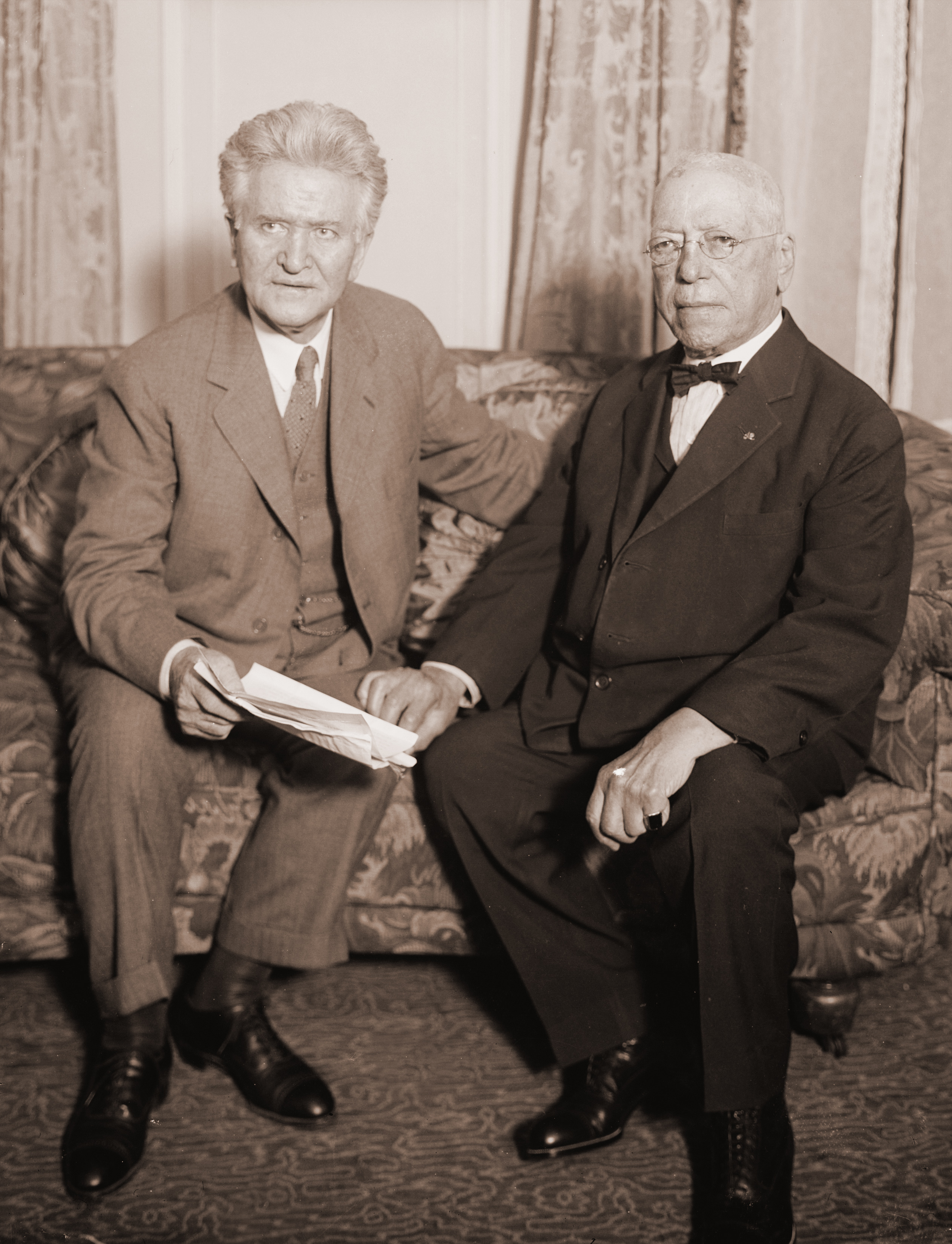
Presidential candidate Robert M. La Follette with American Federation of Labor president Samuel Gompers during the 1924 election campaign.

The nomination of Robert M. La Follette for president took place at a convention held in Cleveland, Ohio from July 4–5, 1924. The convention was called by the Conference for Progressive Political Action (CPPA) and included accredited delegates from national trade unions, state branches of the CPPA, and other political organizations. Members of the Socialist Party of America played a prominent role in the organization of the July convention and the subsequent La Follette presidential campaign; representatives of the Communist Workers Party of America were banned.

== History ==
=== Convention call ===
On February 11 and 12, 1924, approximately 120 delegates from state branches of the Conference for Progressive Political Action (CPPA), the railroad brotherhoods, and several smaller organizations met at the 3rd Conference of the CPPA in St. Louis, Missouri. This meeting viewed the election results of November 1922 with some satisfaction and reaffirmed the CPPA's stated goal "to help nominate and elect to public office only those who are pledged to the interests of the producing classes and to the principles of genuine democracy in agriculture, industry, and government."

No action was taken for the November 1924 campaign, however, as no candidates had been nominated or political platforms passed by the Democratic or Republican parties (both of which organizations included progressive wings). Nor did sentiment exist for an effort under the auspices of the Socialist Party of America (SPA) or the Farmer-Labor Party (FLP).

Instead, the February 1924 CPPA Conference instructed the governing National Committee of the organization to schedule a convention to be held over the Fourth of July holiday "for the purpose of taking action on nomination of candidates for the offices of President and Vice President of the United States, and on other questions that may come before the convention." The National Committee was also instructed to attempt to coordinate its efforts with an organizing committee of the FLP, which had signaled its intention to call a presidential nominating convention in St. Paul, Minnesota opening May 30, 1924.

=== Opening of the convention ===
Twelve hundred delegates and nine thousand spectators ratified the nomination of Senator Robert M. La Follette, Sr. The atmosphere was more sober than the one that had prevailed in 1912, where Theodore Roosevelt elicited much enthusiasm among the delegations. Farmers themselves were sparsely represented; they were too "broke" to come, according to Senator Lynn Frazier. Only one African-American sat in the audience and only one or two eastern intellectuals. The convention was called by the Conference for Progressive Political Action, and duly accredited delegates appeared for such organizations as: the Food Reform Society of America, the National Unity Committee, and the Davenport Iowa Ethical Society. Many students attended, one of the largest groups coming from Columbia University. Jacob Coxey was present as well as John J. Streeter. Radical labor leaders constituted the main body of the congregation, but they refused to let members of the Communist party enter the building.

The Credentials Committee reported unfavorably on the credential of William Mahoney as an individual, while not denying the Minnesota Farmer-Labor Party a right to a seat, citing his acts during and after the St. Louis Conference as well as his active participation in the June 1924 St. Paul Convention of the Federated Farmer-Labor Party, a gathering perceived to have been an appendage of the Workers Party of America and previously condemned by the National Committee of the CPPA.

The CPPA National Committee had previously requested that Wisconsin Senator Robert M. La Follette make a run for the presidency. The Cleveland Convention was addressed by the Senator's son, Robert M. La Follette Jr., who read a message from his father accepting the call and declaring that the time had come "for a militant political movement independent of the two old party organizations." La Follette declined to lead a third party, however, seeking to protect those progressives elected nominally as Republicans and Democrats. La Follette declared that the primary issue of the 1924 campaign was the breaking of the "combined power of the private monopoly system over the political and economic life of the American people." After the November election a new party might well be established, La Follette stated, around which all progressives could unite.

It was the dream of some Progressives, but not La Follette, that they might replace the Democrats, and thereby bring a clearer ideological alignment to American politics. The best way to do this, according to John A. H. Hopkins, earlier a prominent member of the Rooseveltian Progressive Party, would be to prevent either of the major parties from gaining a majority in the Electoral College and thus force the House of Representatives to choose the President.

The convention ended without a nominee for vice president. La Follette at first offered the position to Justice Louis Brandeis, and on his refusal, Sen. Burton K. Wheeler of Montana, who gratefully accepted.
