= 1940 Minnesota gubernatorial election =

- November 5, 1940
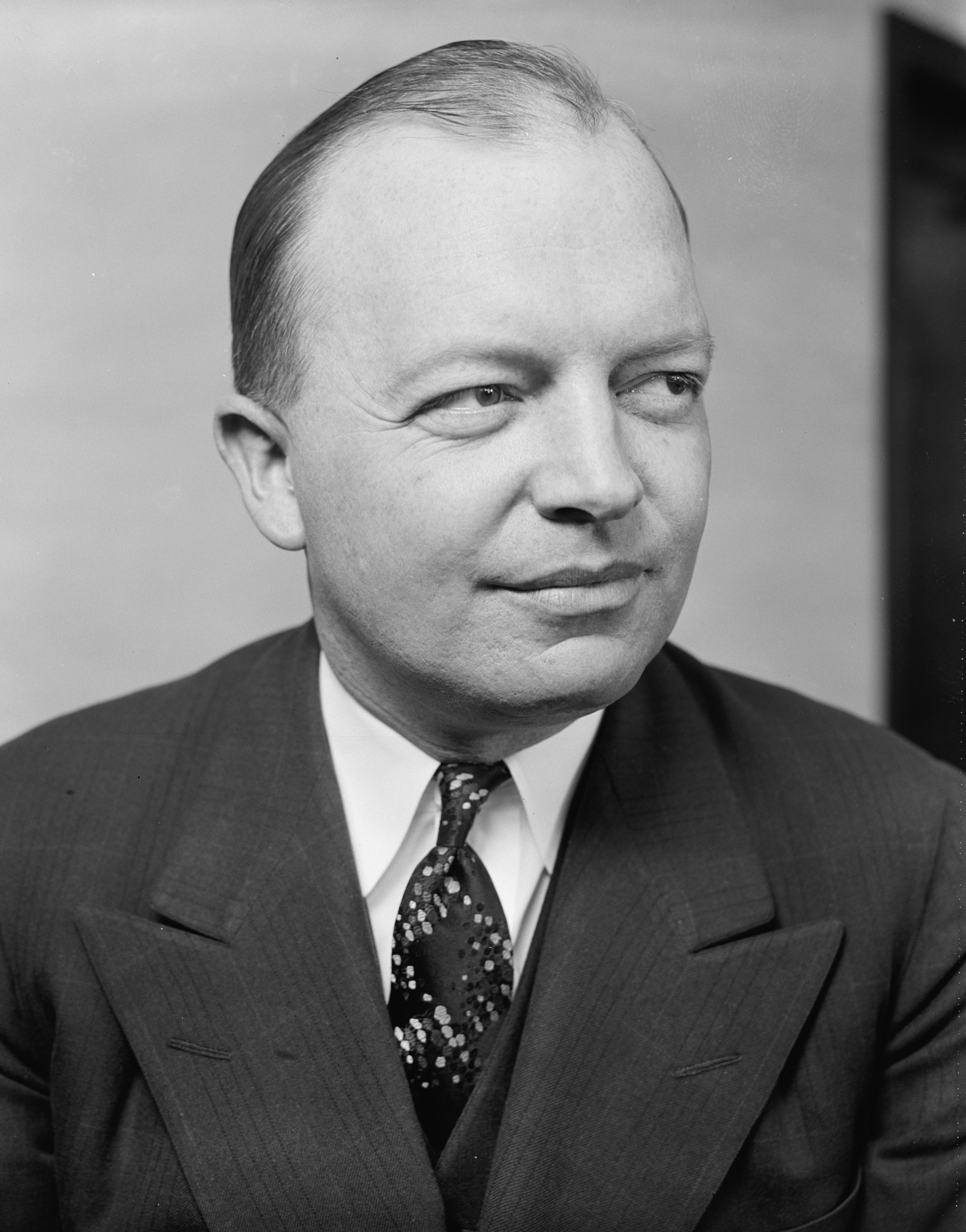

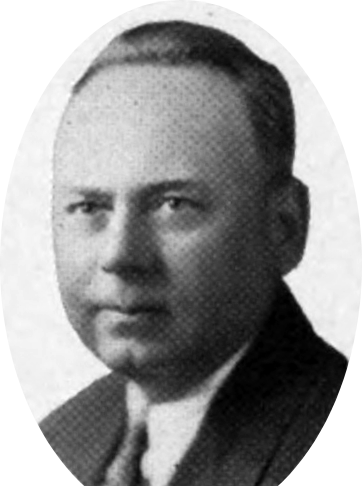

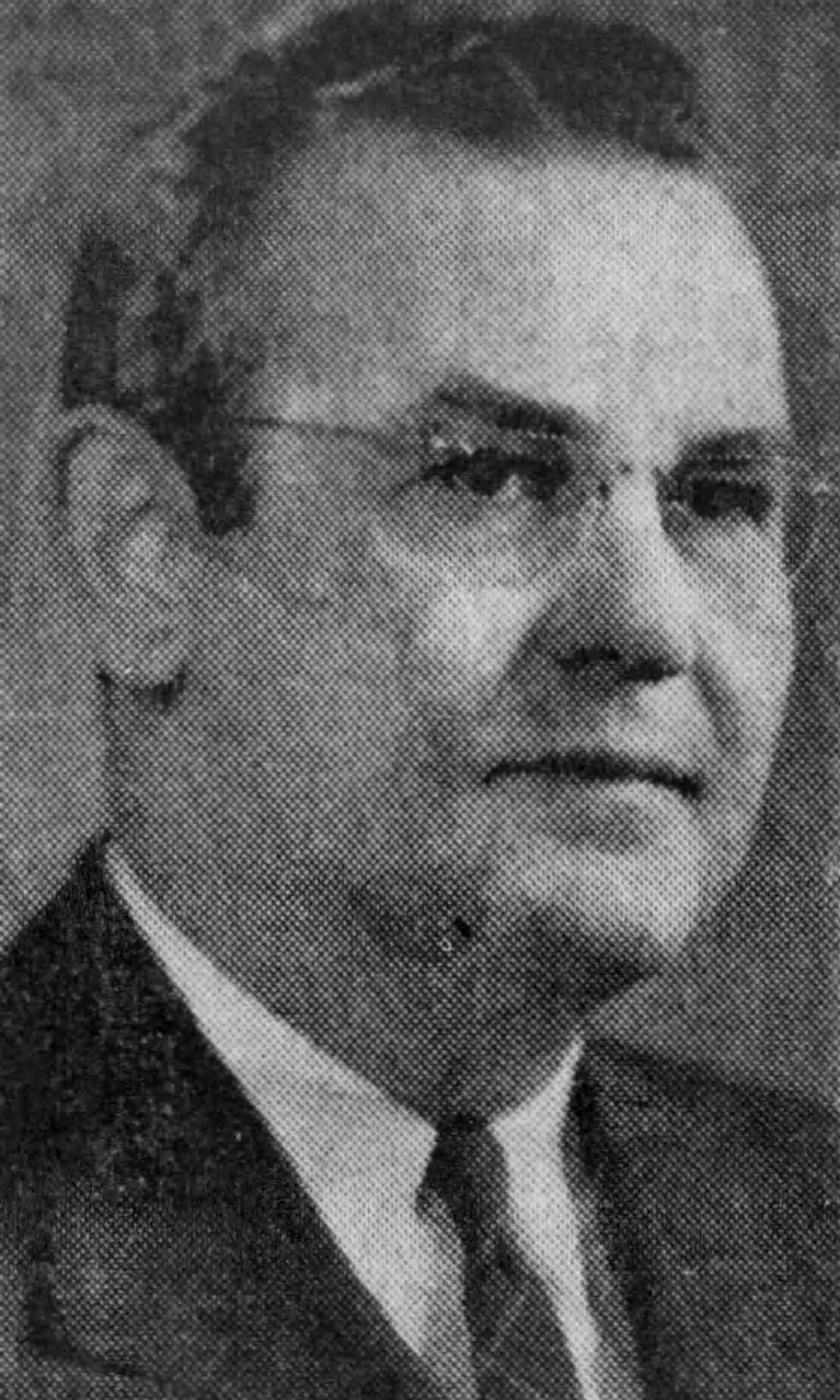
Nominee	Harold Stassen	Hjalmar Petersen	Edward Murphy
Party	Republican	Farmer–Labor	Democratic
Popular vote	654,686	459,609	140,021
Percentage	52.06%	36.55%	11.13%
- County results Stassen: 40–50% 50–60% 60–70% 70–80% Peterson: 40–50% 50–60%
Governor before election
Harold Stassen
Republican
Elected Governor
Harold Stassen
Republican

The 1940 Minnesota gubernatorial election took place on November 5, 1940. Incumbent Republican Harold Stassen defeated Farmer–Labor Party challenger, and former governor, Hjalmar Petersen.

Stassen was seeking a second term. Petersen had served as governor from 1936 to 1937 after the death of Farmer-Laborite governor Floyd B. Olson. In 1936, Elmer Benson was elected governor, and lost his second term to Stassen in 1938. Petersen and Benson were political rivals following the death of Olson, with Petersen unsuccessfully challenging Benson in the Farmer-Labor primary of 1938. With Benson not running in 1940, Petersen found himself without major opposition within his party. Stassen, as a popular incumbent, found no serious opposition either. The Democrats, unable to win any state offices since 1914, had no clear strong candidates, and had placed third every election since 1918.

== Republican primary ==
Incumbent governor Harold Stassen won re-nomination without serious opposition in a landslide. Ernest F. Jacobson ran his campaign on a platform critical of Henrik Shipstead, a Farmer-Laborite who had recently won the Republican nomination for senator. Jacobson believed Stassen should run against Shipstead in the senatorial primary, to prevent a Farmer-Laborite from entering the ranks of the Republican party, leaving Jacobson able to run for governor.

=== Candidates ===
==== Nominated ====
- Harold Stassen, incumbent

=== Eliminated in primary ===
- Arthur B. Gilbert, president of the Recovery League of Minnesota
- Ernest F. Jacobson, attorney

=== Results ===
Republican Party of Minnesota primary results
Party	Candidate	Votes	%
Republican	Harold Stassen	301,508	89.90%
Republican	Ernest F. Jacobson	24,209	7.22%
Republican	Arthur B. Gilbert	9,658	2.88%
Total votes		335,375	100%

== Farmer-Labor primary ==
The Farmer-Labor primary election was won by former governor Hjalmar Petersen. His only major opposition was Charles Egley. Egley considered Petersen too moderate, and openly sparred with pro-Petersen politicial William Mahoney. Egley considered Petersen as too similar to the Republicans, and sabotaged the Farmer-Labor party internally, but also handed the electoral victory to Stassen. Mahoney responded, falling short of calling Egley a communist, but called his campaign "communist-inspired". Petersen did not directly involve himself, allowing Mahoney to argue for him to the press.

=== Candidates ===
==== Nominated ====
- Hjalmar Petersen, former governor

=== Eliminated in primary ===
- Jesse C. Becker
- Edgar Bernard, farmer and Republican primary candidate in 1934.
- Charles Egley, representative of the Farmers Union Livestock Exchange

=== Results ===
Farmer-Labor Party of Minnesota primary results
Party	Candidate	Votes	%
Farmer–Labor	Hjalmar Petersen	92,443	70.47%
Farmer–Labor	Charles Egley	23,201	17.69%
Farmer–Labor	Edgar Bernard	9,271	7.07%
Farmer–Labor	Jesse C. Becker	6,258	4.77%
Total votes		131,173	100%

== Democratic primary ==
Murphy, a pro-Roosevelt candidate, won over Slen in an upset victory. Slen was accused by Murphy and Sylvester McGovern of making a deal to, once nominated, drop out to support Petersen, resulting in his popularity suffering in the last week of the campaign. Murphy was further boosted by an endorsement from Congressman Elmer Ryan. Slen was supported by Joseph N. Moonan, who was elected state chairman, now putting the candidate and party leadership at odds.

=== Candidates ===
==== Nominated ====
- Edward Murphy, attorney

=== Eliminated in primary ===
- John McGovern, farmer
- Sylvester McGovern, radio political commentator on KSTP (AM)
- Theodor S. Slen, member of the Minnesota House of Representatives

=== Results ===
Democratic Party of Minnesota primary results
Party	Candidate	Votes	%
Democratic	Edward Murphy	34,463	36.08%
Democratic	Theodor S. Slen	28,021	29.33%
Democratic	John McGovern	21,795	22.82%
Democratic	Sylvester McGovern	11,249	11.78%
Total votes		95,528	100%

== Candidates ==
- John William Castle, painter (Industrial)
- Martin Mackie (write-in), labor organizer (Communist)
- Edward Murphy, attorney (Democrat)
- Hjalmar Petersen, former governor (Farmer-Labor)
- Harold Stassen, incumbent (Republican)

== Campaigns ==
Petersen opened his campaign on September 30, at a dinner in Mankato, with a speech attacking Stassen. He claimed that relief funds after a tornado in Anoka were misused, with one person's $600 damages being compensated for with $3,341. Petersen said that state financial reports were mandated under state law, but Stassen released none in his term, despite Stassen's claims of $18 million in saving and a 25% reduction in state employees. The actual number of savings was unknown, and the reduction in state employees was only 14%, almost all of which was cut from the highway department. Furthermore, the number of miles of highway paved by the highway department was halved. Petersen gave explicit accusations of forgery and embezzlement by the Stassen administration. He called on liberal voters who voted for Roosevelt to put their support with progressives and leftists behind his campaign.

Stassen spent little time campaigning after his primary victory, focusing mostly on supporting the elections of Henrik Shipstead and Wendell Willkie.

With the Farmer-Labor party falling victim to factionalism, Murphy attempted to consolidate the similarly divided and factional Democratic Party around him. He stated, "If Minnesota Democrats will forget factionalism and petty jealousies, we will become the No. 1 party in Minnesota. I have no feeling against any Democrat or faction of Democrats. I invite and ask co-operation of all. I appreciate the clean, sportsman like campaigns conducted by my three (primary) opponents and their supporters and look forward to their help in November."

Stassen was at an advantage with an 81% approval rate.

== Results ==
1940 gubernatorial election, Minnesota
Party	Candidate	Votes	%	±%
Republican	Harold Stassen (incumbent)	654,686	52.06%	−7.86%
Farmer–Labor	Hjalmar Petersen	459,609	36.55%	+2.37%
Democratic	Edward Murphy	140,021	11.13%	+5.32%
Industrial	John William Castle	3,175	0.25%	+0.17%
Communist	Martin Mackie (write-in)	360	0.03%	n/a
Majority		195,077	15.51%	
Turnout		1,257,851		
Republican hold		Swing		

== See also ==
- List of Minnesota gubernatorial elections
