= Theodor S. Slen =

American lawyer (1885–1986)

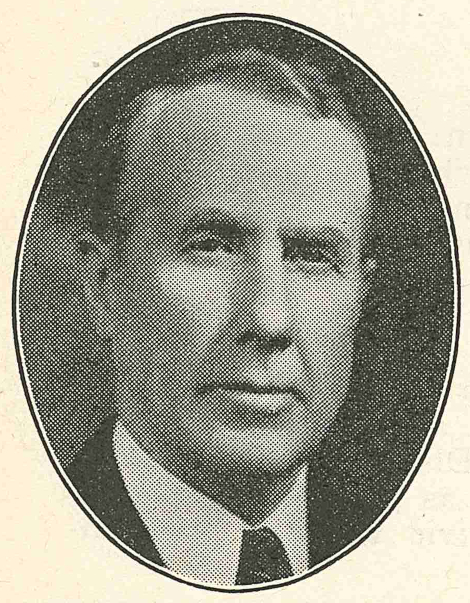
- Slen in 1939

Member of the Minnesota House of Representatives from the 24th district
- In office January 7, 1935 – January 5, 1941
- Preceded by: Charles E. Retrum
- Succeeded by: Edward Hagen

Personal details
- Born: October 15, 1885 Delavan, Minnesota
- Died: July 4, 1986 (aged 100) Madison, Minnesota
- Party: Minnesota Democratic Party
- Education: University of Minnesota; Madison Lutheran Normal School; St. Olaf College
- Awards: Purple Heart; Silver Star

Theodor Samuel Slen (October 15, 1885 – July 4, 1986) was an American educator, lawyer, and politician.

Slen was born in Delavan, Faribault County, Minnesota. He moved with his family in 1898 to a farm near Boyd, Minnesota. Slen graduated from Boyd High School in Boyd, Minnesota and then graduated from the Madison Lutheran Normal School in 1906. He received his bachelor's degree from St. Olaf College in 1912 and his law degree from the University of Minnesota Law School in 1915. Slen was admitted to the Minnesota bar in 1915. He lived with his wife and family in Madison, Lac qui Parle County, Minnesota and practiced law.

He served in the Minnesota National Guard during the Mexican Border Conflict and World War I, during which he was deployed in France. Slen served as a probate judge and attorney for Madison, Minnesota and as the Lac qui Parle County Attorney. Slen served in the Minnesota House of Representatives from 1935 to 1940 and was an Independent and was a Democrat. In 1940, Slen ran for governor as a Democrat, placing second in the primary with 29.33% of the vote.

Slen was notable for his popularity among both Democrats and Farmer-Laborites, and was one of the first politicians to begins seriously calling for the parties to merge. In 1942, he began formal calls within the party for the merger to happen. The two parties would merge in 1944, becoming the Minnesota Democratic–Farmer–Labor Party.

Slen died at the Madison Lutheran Home in Madison, Minnesota from pneumonia.
