= 1916 Progressive National Convention =

American political event

- 1916 presidential election
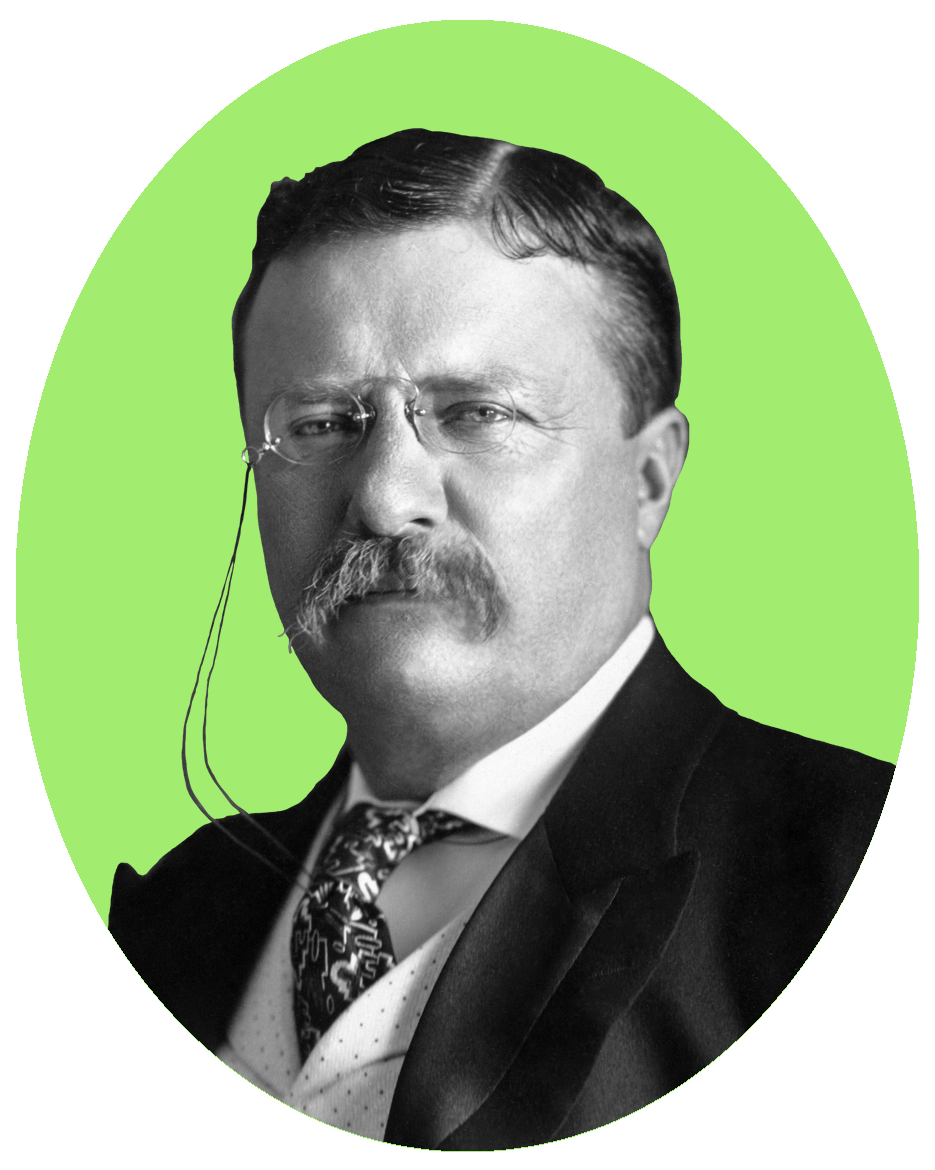
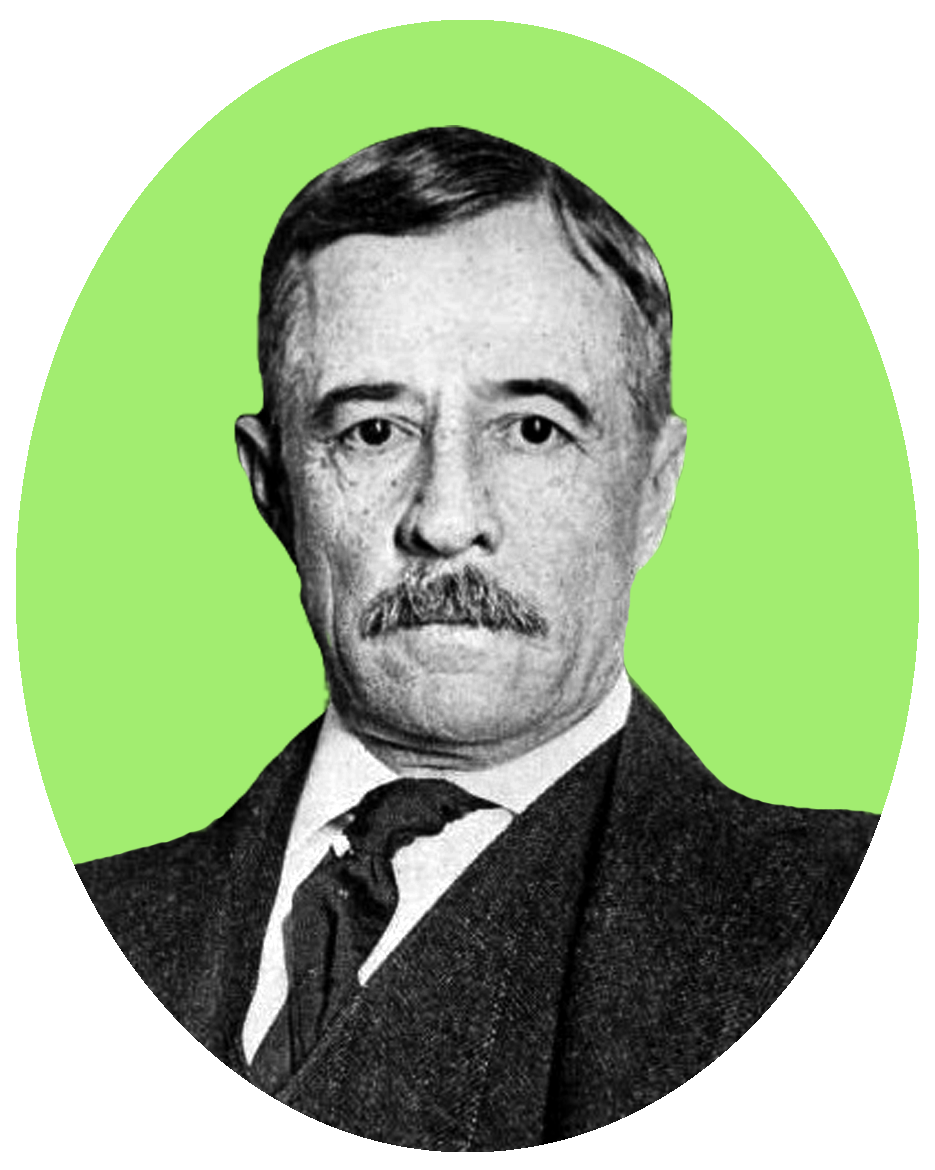
- Nominees; Roosevelt and Parker

Convention
- Dates: June 7–10, 1916
- City: Chicago, Illinois
- Venue: Auditorium Building
- Keynote speaker: Raymond Robins

Candidates
- Presidential nominee: Theodore Roosevelt of New York (refused nomination)
- Vice-presidential nominee: John M. Parker of Louisiana
- Other candidates: none

Voting
- Total delegates: 2000+
- Votes needed for nomination: 498
- Results (president): Theodore Roosevelt (NY): 2000+ (100%)
- Ballots: 1

The 1916 Progressive National Convention was held in July 1916, in conjunction with the Republican national convention. This was to facilitate a possible reconciliation. Five delegates from each convention met to negotiate.

== Proceedings ==
The Progressives wanted reunification, but with Roosevelt as the Republican presidential nominee, which the Republicans adamantly opposed. Meanwhile, Charles Evans Hughes, a moderate progressive, became the front-runner at the Republican convention, though opposed by many conservatives. The Progressives suggested Hughes as a compromise candidate. Then Roosevelt sent a message proposing conservative Senator Henry Cabot Lodge. As a result, the Progressives immediately nominated Roosevelt again for president, with Louisiana businessman John M. Parker as the vice presidential nominee. Parker had run for governor as a Progressive early in 1916. (The Republican Party was deeply unpopular in Louisiana.) Parker got a respectable 37% of the vote. He was the only Progressive to run for governor that year. Others suggested for the vice presidency were California Governor and the 1912 vice presidential nominee Hiram Johnson, and Chairman of the Party Convention Raymond Robins, but both withdrew their names in favor of Parker. However, Roosevelt later telegraphed the convention and declared that he could not accept their nomination and would be endorsing Republican presidential nominee Charles Hughes.

Robins delivered the keynote speech at the opening of the convention.

== Confusion and collapse ==
With Roosevelt refusing to be their candidate, the Progressive Party quickly fell into disarray; there was a temporary shout led by former Representative Victor Murdock of Kansas for a ticket consisting of three-time Democratic presidential nominee William Jennings Bryan and industrialist Henry Ford but it amounted to little.

Some like National Committeeman Harold L. Ickes refused to consider endorsing Hughes, and there was some talk of nominating another for the presidency in Roosevelt's stead, such as Hiram Johnson or Gifford Pinchot. However those discussed refused to consider the notion, and by this point some leaders like Henry Justin Allen had started to follow Roosevelt's lead and endorsed the Republican ticket, and various state parties such as those in Iowa and Maine began to disband. Finally, when the Progressive Party National Committee met in Chicago on June 26, those in attendance begrudgingly endorsed Hughes; even those like Ickes who had vehemently refused to consider granting an endorsement to Hughes began to recognize that without Roosevelt the party had no electoral staying power. There had been a weak attempt to replace Roosevelt on the ticket with the former Kansas Representative Victor Murdock, but the motion was defeated 31 to 15.

=== Candidates gallery ===
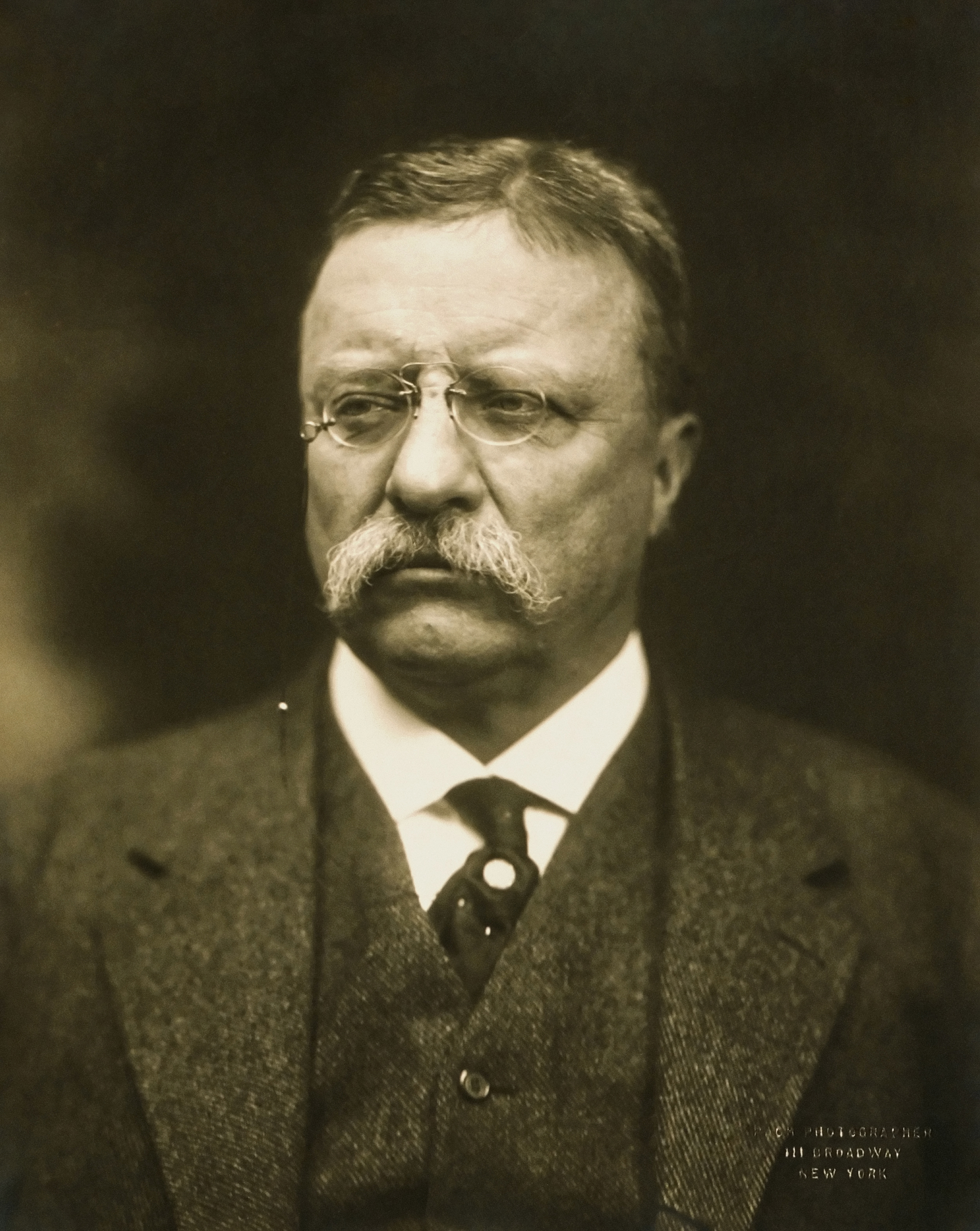
Former President
Theodore Roosevelt
of New York
(Refused nomination)

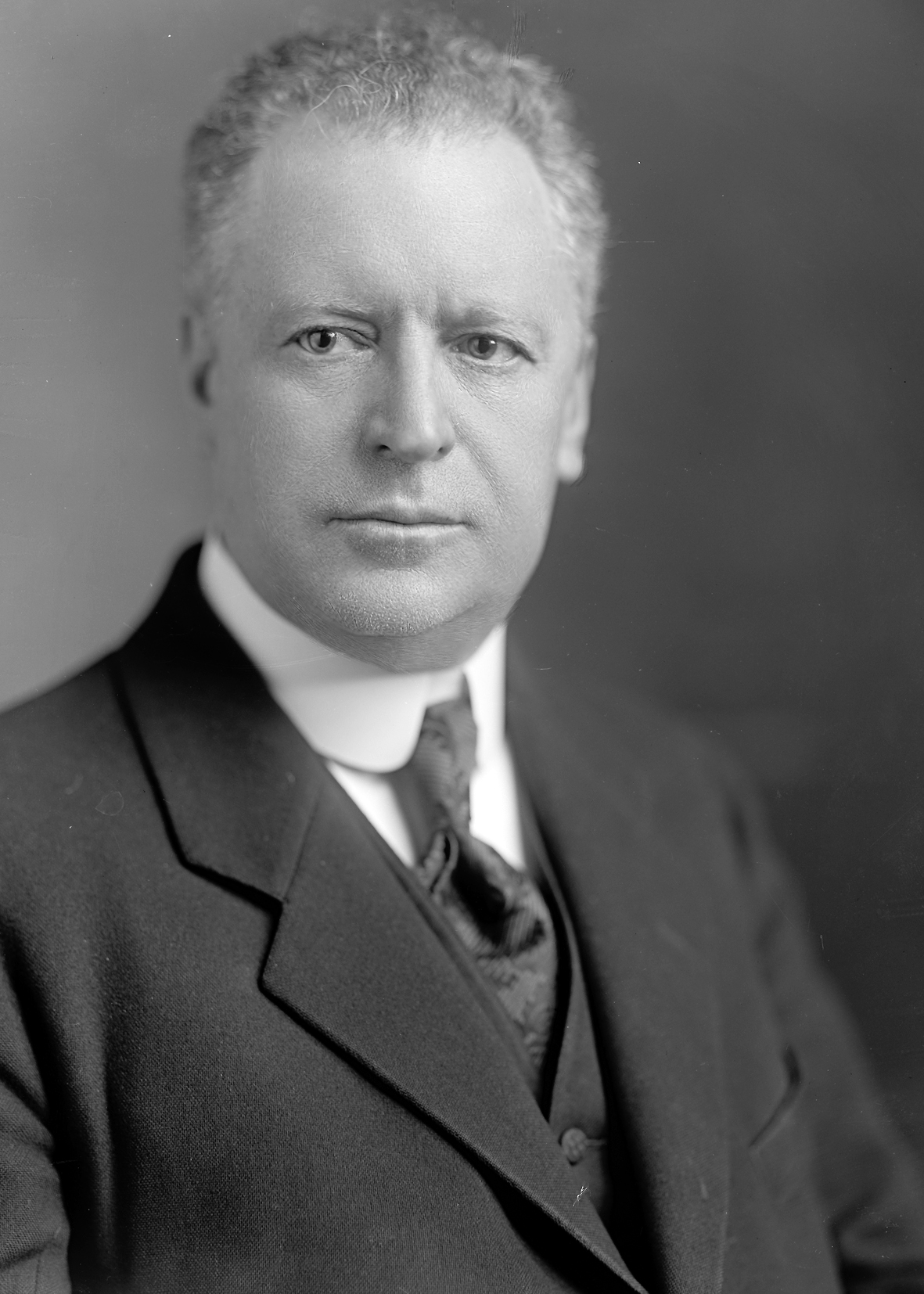
Former Representative
Victor Murdock
of Kansas
(Not formally nominated)

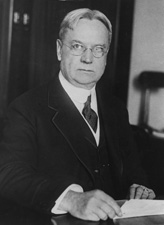
Governor
Hiram Johnson
of California
(Declined interest)

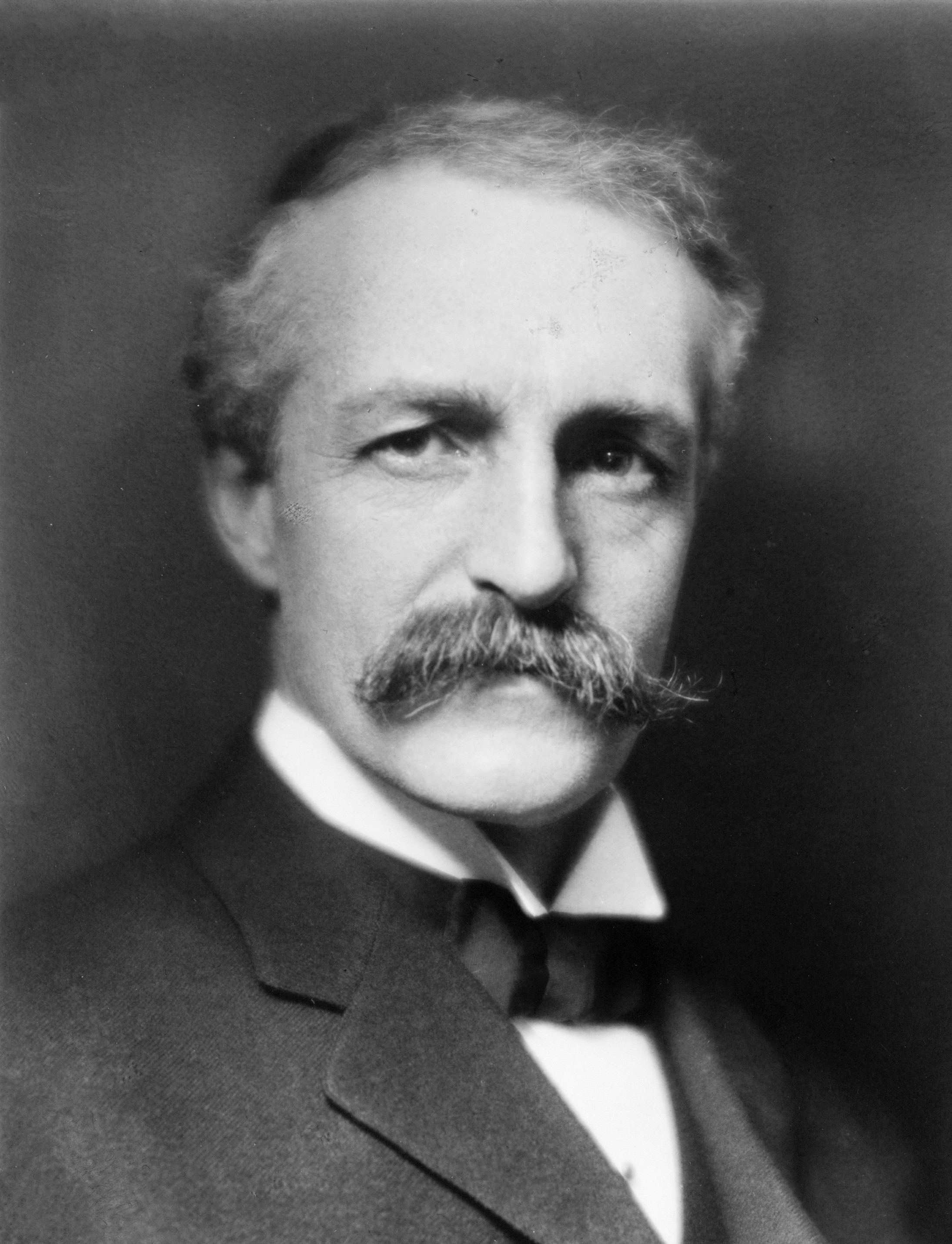
Former Chief of the Forest Service
Gifford Pinchot
of Pennsylvania
(Declined interest)

Most of its members would return to the Republican Party, although a substantial minority supported Wilson for his efforts in keeping the United States out of World War I. Roosevelt had turned down the Progressive presidential nomination for both personal and political reasons; he had become convinced that running for president on a third-party ticket again would merely give the election to the Democrats, a result he loathed to make possible, since he had developed a strong dislike for President Wilson. He also believed Wilson was allowing Germany and other warring nations in Europe to "bully" and intimidate the United States.

The Roosevelt-Parker ticket did manage to get on the ballot in several states.

== See also ==
- 1916 Democratic National Convention
- 1916 Republican National Convention
- 1916 United States presidential election

Preceded by 1912; Chicago, Illinois	Progressive National Conventions	Succeeded by 1924; Chicago, Illinois
