= 1912 Progressive National Convention =

American political event

- 1912 presidential election
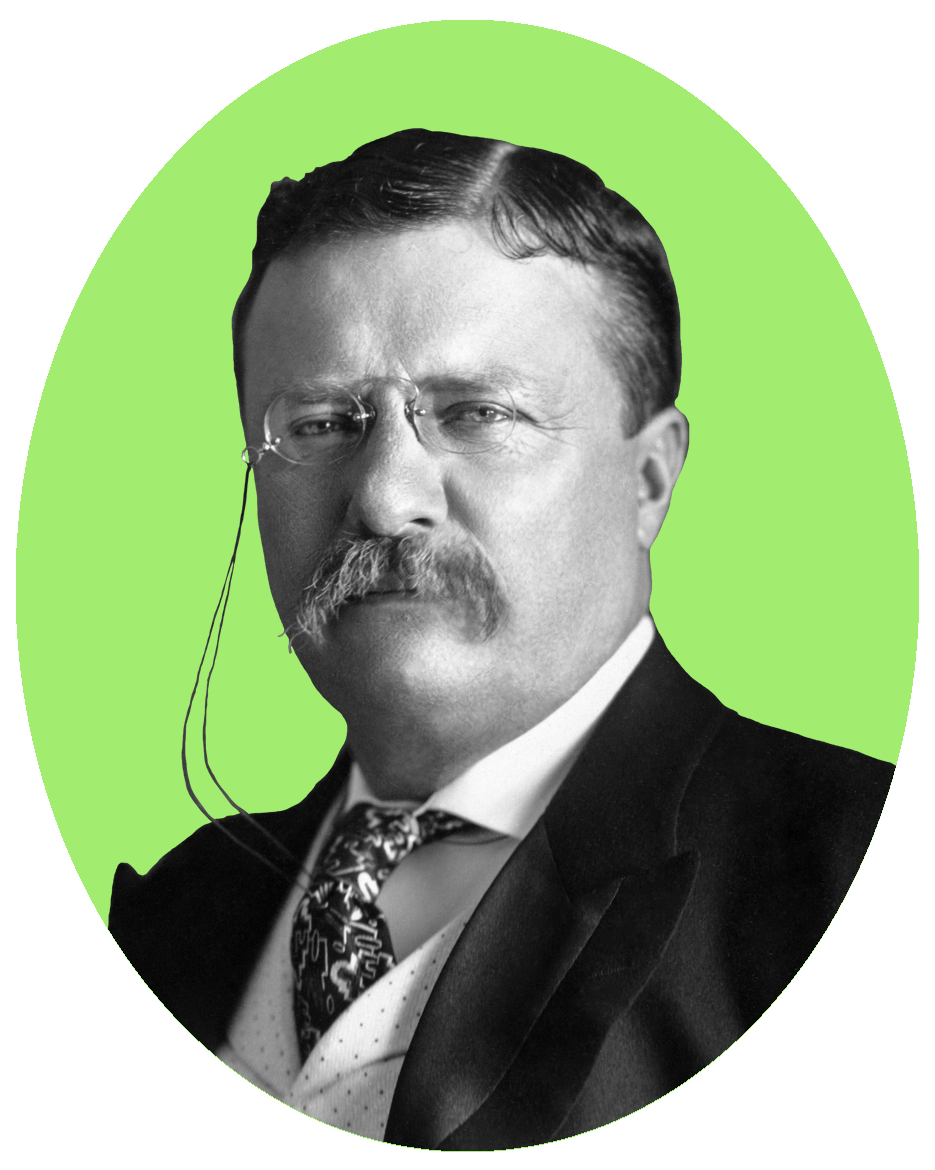
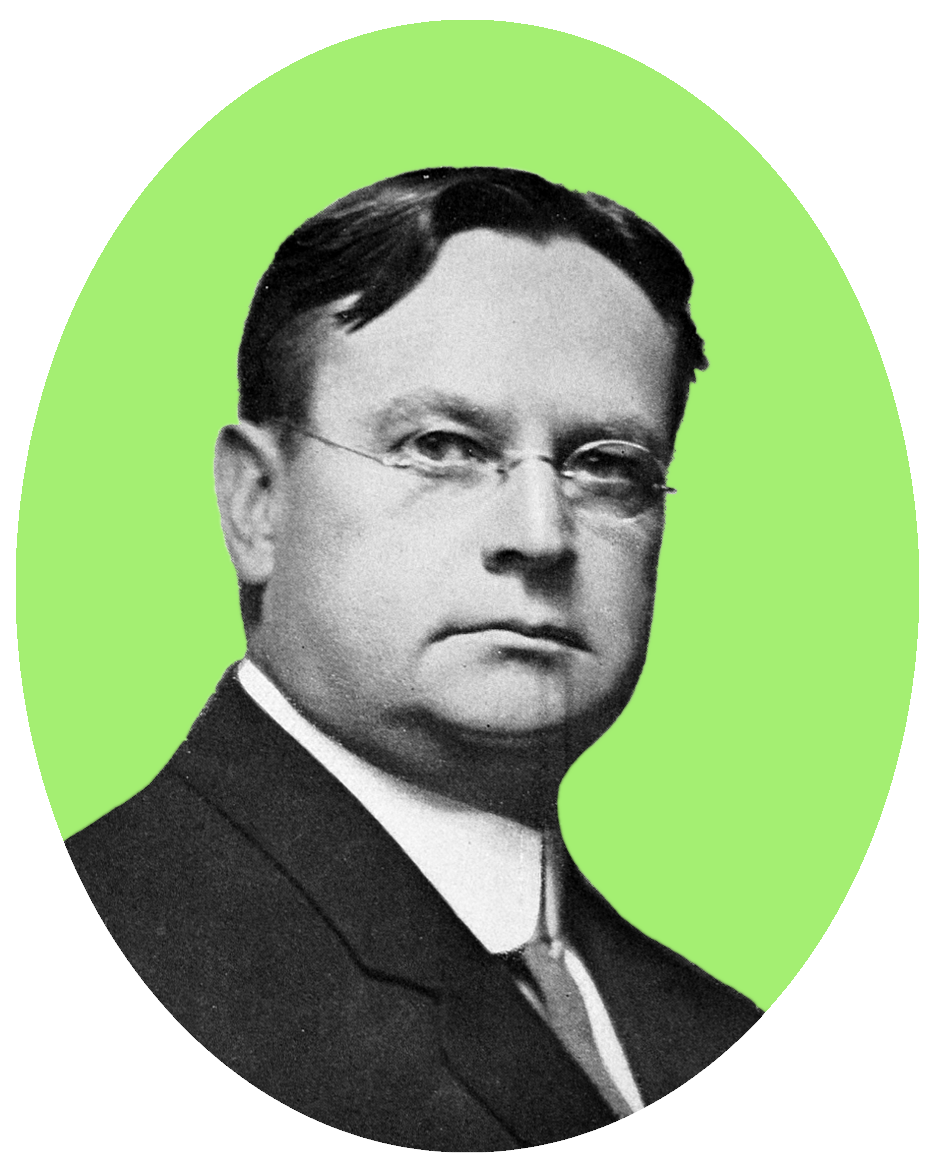
- Nominees; Roosevelt and Johnson

Convention
- Dates: August 5, 1912
- City: Chicago, Illinois
- Venue: Chicago Coliseum
- Platform: 1912 Progressive Party Platform

Candidates
- Presidential nominee: Theodore Roosevelt of New York
- Vice-presidential nominee: Hiram Johnson of California
- Other candidates: None

Voting
- Total delegates: 2000+
- Votes needed for nomination: ?
- Results (president): Theodore Roosevelt (NY): 2000+ (100%)
- Ballots: 1

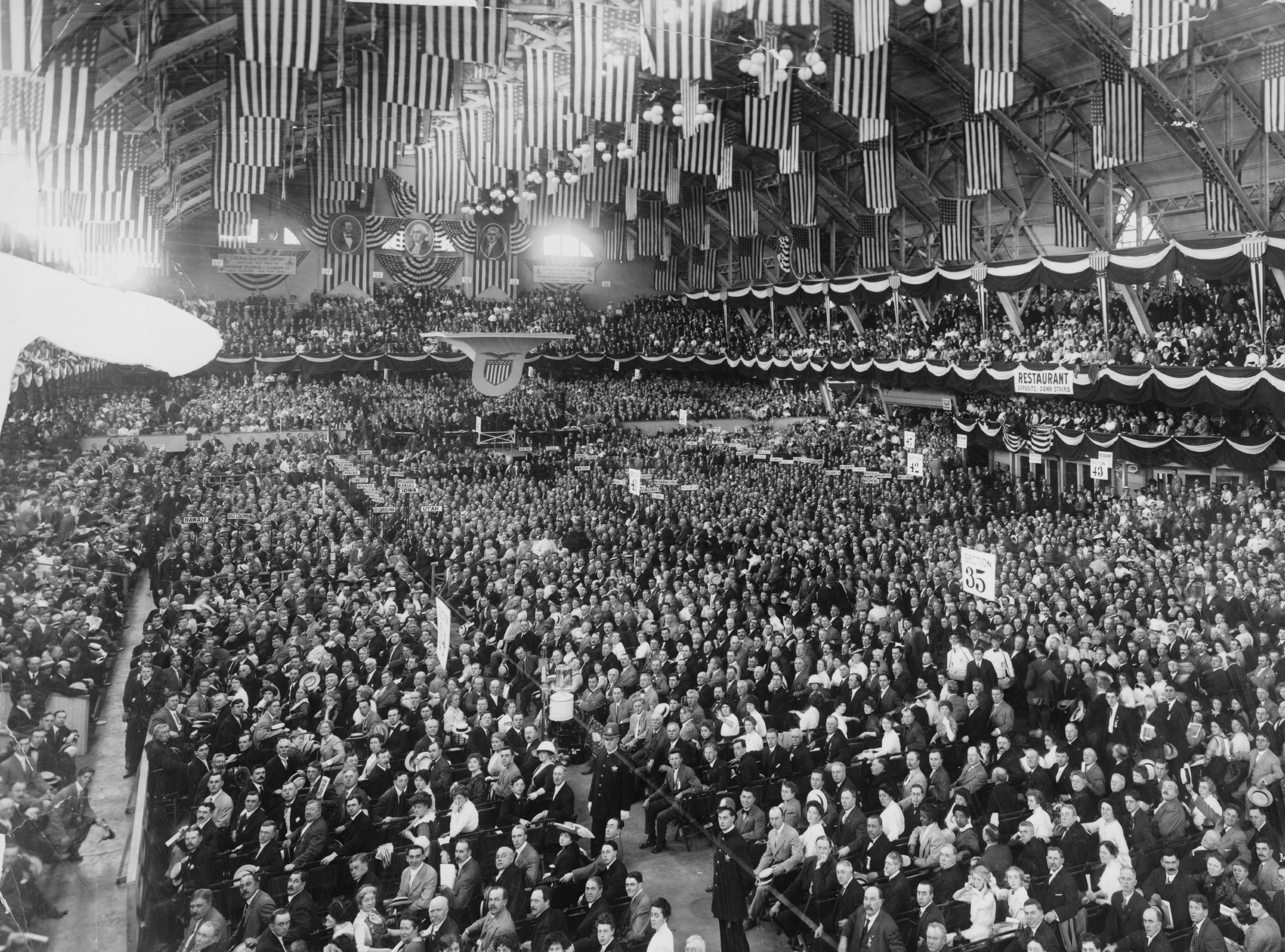
Progressive convention, 1912

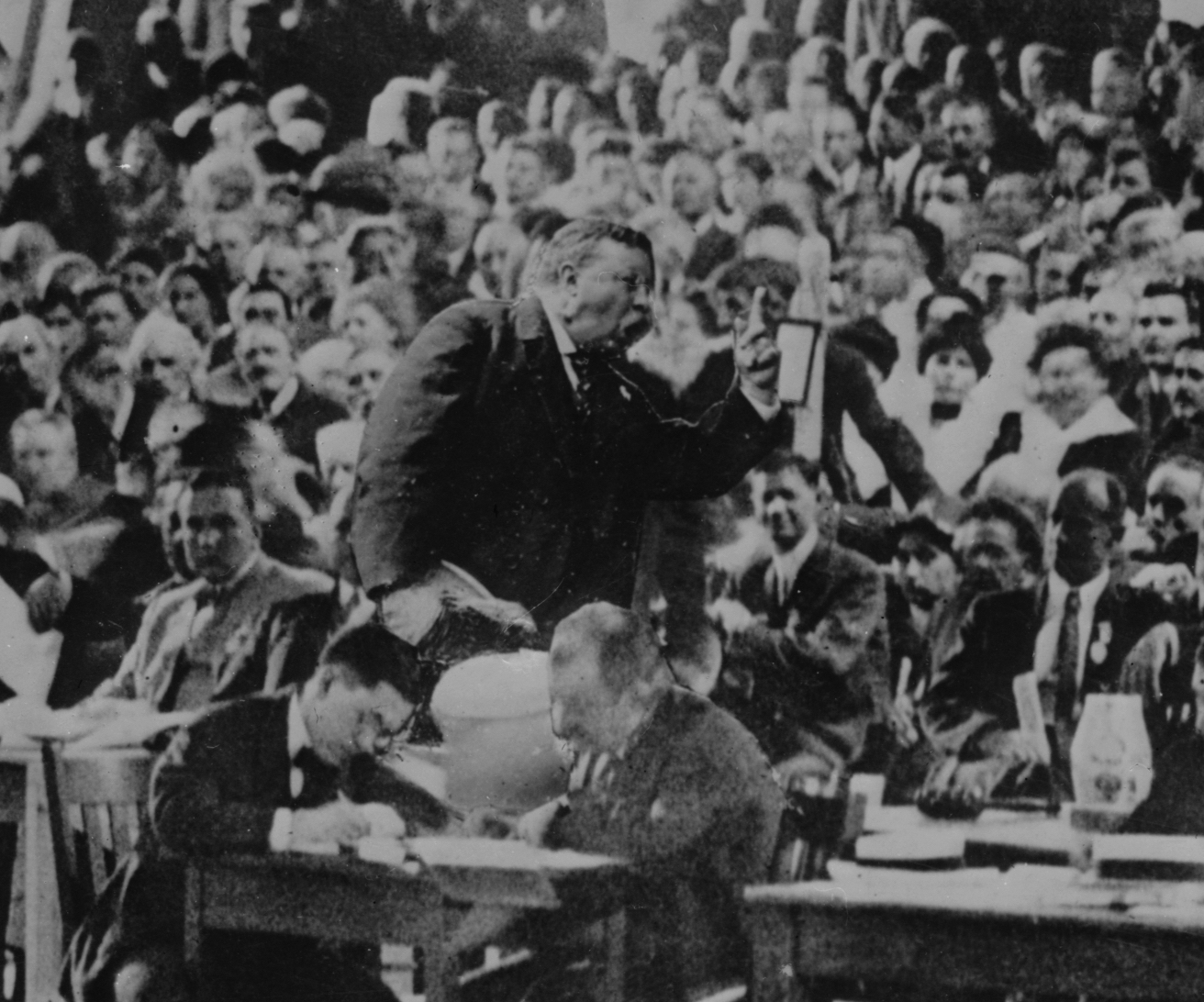
Roosevelt delivering a speech at the convention

The 1912 Progressive National Convention was held in August 1912. Angered at the renomination of President William Howard Taft over their candidate at the 1912 Republican National Convention, supporters of former President Theodore Roosevelt convened in Chicago and endorsed the formation of a national progressive party. When formally launched later that summer, the new Progressive Party acclaimed Roosevelt as its presidential nominee and Governor Hiram Johnson of California as his vice presidential running mate. When questioned by reporters, Roosevelt said he felt as strong as a "bull moose". Henceforth known as the "Bull Moose Party", the Progressives promised to increase federal regulation and protect the welfare of ordinary people.

The party was funded by publisher Frank Munsey and its executive secretary George Walbridge Perkins, an employee of banker J. P. Morgan and International Harvester. Perkins blocked an antitrust plank, shocking reformers who thought of Roosevelt as a true trust-buster. The delegates to the convention sang the hymn "Onward, Christian Soldiers" as their anthem. In a famous acceptance speech, Roosevelt compared the coming presidential campaign to the Battle of Armageddon and stated that the Progressives were going to "battle for the Lord".

The August convention opened with great enthusiasm. Over 2,000 delegates attended, including many women. In 1912, neither the Republican candidate, President of the United States William Howard Taft, nor the Democratic nominee Woodrow Wilson, had endorsed women's suffrage on the national level and the famed suffragist and social worker Jane Addams gave a seconding speech for Roosevelt's nomination.

Although Roosevelt insisted on excluding African-American Republicans from the South (whom he regarded as a corrupt and ineffective element), he did include black delegates from all other parts of the country, and he further alienated white southern supporters on the eve of the election by publicly dining with black people at a Rhode Island hotel. Roosevelt said at the end of his speech "We stand at Armageddon, and we battle for the Lord."

== Candidates gallery ==
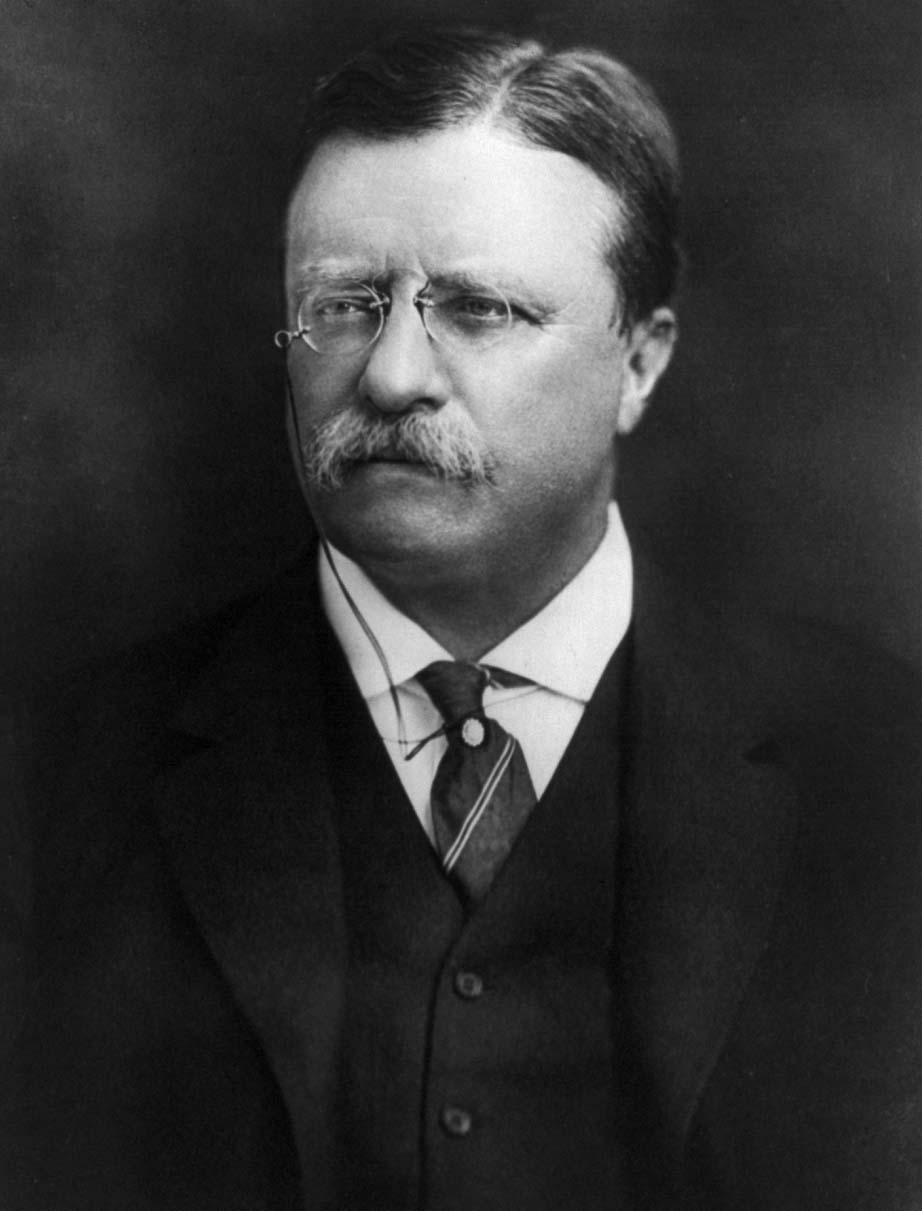
Former President
Theodore Roosevelt
from New York

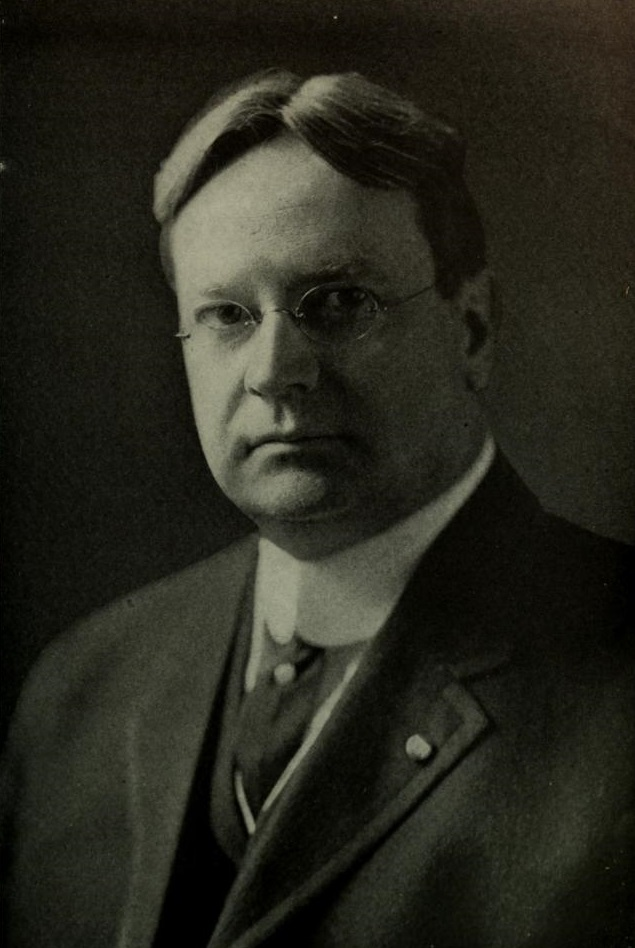
Governor
Hiram Johnson
of California

== The Platform ==
The main work of the convention was the platform, which set forth the new party's appeal to the voters. It was drafted in part by Charles McCarthy, and included a broad range of social and political reforms advocated by progressives.

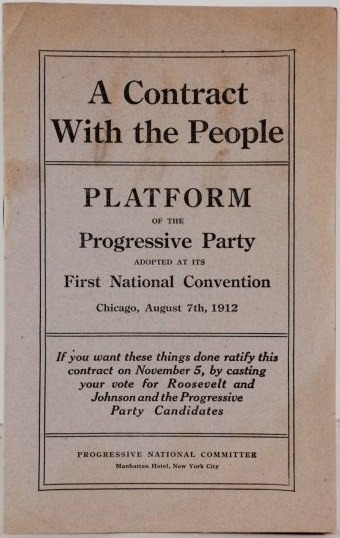
16-page campaign booklet with party platform of the Progressive Party

The platform's main theme was reversing the domination of politics by business interests, which allegedly controlled the Republicans' and Democrats' parties alike. The platform asserted that the first task of the statesmanship of the day was to destroy the invisible Government, and to dissolve the unholy alliance between corrupt business and corrupt politics.

To that end, the platform called for

- strict limits and disclosure requirements on political campaign contributions,
- registration of lobbyists, and
- recording and publication of congressional committee proceedings.

In the social sphere the platform called for

- a National Health Service to include all existing government medical agencies;
- social insurance, to provide for the elderly, the unemployed, and the disabled;
- limited injunctions in strikes;

Ticket to the 1912 Progressive National Convention

- a minimum wage law for women;
- an eight-hour workday;
- a federal securities commission;
- farm relief;
- workers' compensation for work-related injuries;
- an inheritance tax, and
- a constitutional amendment to allow a federal income tax.

The political reforms proposed included

- women's suffrage,
- direct election of senators, and
- primary elections for state and federal nominations.

The platform also urged states to adopt measures for "direct democracy", including

- the recall election (citizens may remove an elected official before the end of his term),
- the referendum (citizens may decide on a law by popular vote),
- the initiative (citizens may propose a law by petition and enact it by popular vote), and
- judicial referendum (when a court declares a law unconstitutional the citizens may override that ruling by popular vote).

Besides these measures, the platform called for reductions in the tariff, limitations on naval armaments by international agreement and improvements to inland waterways.

The biggest controversy at the convention was over the platform section dealing with trusts and monopolies such as Standard Oil. The convention approved a strong "trust-busting" plank, but Roosevelt had it replaced with language that spoke only of "strong National regulation" and "permanent active [Federal] supervision" of major corporations. This retreat shocked reformers like Pinchot, who blamed it on Perkins (a director of U.S. Steel). The result was a deep split in the new party that was never resolved.

In general, the platform expressed Roosevelt's "New Nationalism": a strong government to regulate industry, protect the middle and working classes, and carry on great national projects. This New Nationalism was paternalistic in direct contrast to Wilson's individualistic philosophy of "New Freedom". Roosevelt also favored a vigorous foreign policy, including strong military power. Though the platform called for limiting naval armaments, it also recommended the construction of two new battleships per year, much to the distress of outright pacifists such as Jane Addams.

Preceded by none	Progressive National Conventions	Succeeded by 1916; Chicago, Illinois
