= Conference for Progressive Political Action =

- Founded: 1922
- Dissolved: 1925
- Ideology: Social liberalism Social democracy Radicalism; Progressivism; Liberal socialism Democratic socialism
- Political position: Center-left

The Conference for Progressive Political Action was officially established by the convention call of the 16 major railway labor unions in the United States, represented by a committee of six: William H. Johnston of the Machinists' Union, Martin F. Ryan of the Railway Carmen, Warren S. Stone of the Locomotive Engineers, E. J. Manion or the Railroad Telegraphers, Timothy Healy of the Stationary Firemen, and L. E. Sheppard of the Order of Railway Conductors. The idea of joining the "forces of every progressive, liberal, and radical organization of the workers must be mobilized to repel these assaults and to advance the industrial and political power of the working class" seems to have originated with the National Executive Committee of the Socialist Party, which issued an appeal to unions and progressive political organizations for such a group in September 1921.

The CPPA was originally intended to be an umbrella organization uniting various elements of the Farmer–Labor political movement around a common program for joint independent political action. In practice, however, invitations to the group's founding conference were issued to members of a wide variety of "progressive" organizations, including those who did not seek a new political organization. As a result, the body was quite heterogeneous and unable to agree on a program or even a declaration of principles at its initial gathering.

== Founding Conference ==
The first National Conference of the CPPA was held in Chicago in February 1922. It was attended by 124 delegates from a broad spectrum of labor, farmer, and political organizations, as well as a group of progressive individuals. The gathering passed an "Address to the American People", stating its criticism of existing conditions and formally proposing an amorphous plan of action validating the status quo ante: the labor unions on the group's Right Wing to endorse labor-friendly candidates of the Democratic Party, the Socialists and Farmer–Labor Party adherents on the group's left wing to conduct their own independent campaigns.

The Founding Conference passed a "Plan of Action" consisting of three rather amorphous resolutions that served in lieu of a more formal constitution. The resolutions called for all labor, farmer, cooperative, and progressive political forces would unite to secure the nomination and election of members of Congress and to other state and local elective bodies. who were in agreement with the CPPA's support the interests of the producing classes. To this end, it urged the formation of joint committees within each state, congressional district, county, and municipality to decide upon the specific course of action.

A General Committee of 15 members, "as representative as possible of the various groups constituting this Conference" was elected to serve as a coordinating body for a Second Conference of the organization.

The CPPA was to be funded either via per capita contributions from member unions—a "voluntary contribution" of at least 1/2 cent per member per quarter—or through individual membership. State branches of the CPPA were to buy individual membership cards for 25 cents each and to remit 25 percent of all other income to the national organization. At Conferences, national labor, farmers', and cooperative organizations were to be allowed one vote for every 10,000 members, or fraction thereof, with the voting strength of other organizations set by decision of the National Committee.

== Second Conference ==
The Second National Conference of the CPPA was held in Cleveland on December 11–12, 1922. Despite the mutual hostility between the Workers Party and many in the leadership of the CPPA, the Workers Party nevertheless attempted to shape the course of the proceedings through a campaign to generate telegrams supporting the immediate formation of an "independent party of labor opposing all capitalist parties".

The National Committee reported to the gathering that it had worked "in close association with the People's Legislative Service and with the weekly, Labor" over the course of the year. In 32 of the 48 states there had been state and local organizations of the CPPA formed. The legislative records of US Senators and Representatives were carefully monitored and special state editions of Labor, totaling over 1 million copies, were distributed in 8 northern and midwestern states. The National Committee declared the 1922 campaign a great success, claiming that 21 improved Senators had been elected, while 93 undesirable members of the House had been defeated with another 13 quitting their seats.

The Workers Party of America decided to send four delegates to the meeting at the December 5, 1922, meeting of its governing Administrative Council. William F. Dunne, Caleb Harrison, Ludwig Lore, and C. E. Ruthenberg were elected as representatives of the party, with J. Louis Engdahl, the 5th place vote-getter, named as alternate.

The Credentials Committee, after protracted debate, reported that the policies of the Workers Party of America and the Young Workers League of America were not in harmony with the declarations and aims of the conference and recommended that the representatives of these organizations not be seated. Chairman William H. Johnston quickly presented the recommendation of the committee and gavelled the matter closed without objection. Robert D. Cramer of Minneapolis rose to protest the ruling of the chair, but his motion died for the lack of a second. Since the snap tactic of the chair was not appealed, the gathering is officially said to have "unanimously" refused the WPA a place—despite the presence of WPA members with other credentials inside the body. The WPA reported their side of the events of the convention in the pages of their weekly press, including the story of how convention delegate and member of the Central Executive Committee of the WPA J.B. Salutsky refused to come to the aid of his party.

The financial statement of the CPPA in its first year showed receipts of just over $5700, expenditures of about $4850, and unpaid bills in the amount of $10,875. The major part of the unpaid bills related to the special editions of Labor, printing, and expenses of the People's Legislative Service.

The 2nd Conference of the CPPA approved a membership standard opening the organization to "bona fide labor organizations, progressive organizations of farmers, cooperative societies, liberal political parties and groups, and to other organizations and individuals who are in accord with the purposes of this Conference." A National Committee of 21 was provided for, as well as annual meetings of the organization.

The 2nd Conference split over the issue of an independent political party, with a proposal by five delegates of the Farmer–Labor Party calling for "independent political action by the agricultural and industrial workers through a party of their own" defeated by a vote of 52 to 64. A majority report against an independent political party was instead adopted. The gathering also adopted a short platform calling for public operation of the railroads, coal mines, and water power resources, direct election of the President, an end to the use of courts to declare legislation unconstitutional, enactment of a farm credit organization, increased tax rates on large incomes and inheritances, and legislation providing for minimum employment standards for women. The Conference instructed the National Committee to add additional planks relating to child labor, civil liberties, the rights of organized labor, and other matters.

The defeat of the bid for an independent political party cost the CPPA one its major component organizations. At the close of the 2nd Conference, the Farmer–Labor Party delegation announced that their group would no longer affiliate with the CPPA.

On the other hand, the Socialist Party at its May 1923 National Convention voted after lengthy debate to retain its affiliation with the CPPA and to work for an independent political party from within that group. The May 20 vote in favor of maintaining affiliation with the CPPA was 38–12.

The CPPA worked closely with the People's Legislative Service, of which CPPA National Committee member Basil M. Manly was director. On December 2, 1923, the People's Legislative Service held a conference in Washington, DC, attended by about 300 people—including progressive Senators and Representatives, who formed a permanent organization and appointed committees to work on specific questions on belhalf of a permanent "People's Bloc".

By the end of 1923, the CPPA had state organizations in about 30 states. Some of these state organizations did not retain the name "Conference for Progressive Political Action", however, as exemplified by the "Indiana Political Action League", the "Iowa Cooperative Legislative Council", the "Michigan Progressive Voters' League," and the "North Carolina Farmer–Labor Political Conference".

== Third Conference ==
The 3rd Conference of the CPPA was held in St. Louis, Missouri, on February 11–12, 1924. It was attended by about 120 delegates representing the state branches of the CPPA, railroad labor organizations, the Socialist Party, and scattered groups. The Conference met at an awkward time, before the nomination of national candidates and national platforms had taken place, and little was accomplished. The body did, however, instruct the National Committee to "immediately issue a call for a convention of workers, farmers, and progressives for the purpose of taking action on nomination of candidates for the offices of President and Vice President of the United States, and on other questions that may come before the convention.

The 3rd Conference opened the door to increased participation by third parties, allowing each two delegates for each state organization—the same as that allocated to state branches of the CPPA itself. The St. Louis Conference also instructed the National Committee to secure the cooperation of the committee calling the St. Paul Convention of the Farmer–Labor Party for May 30, 1924.

The National Executive Committee of the Socialist Party met in St. Louis from February 9–12, 1924, in conjunction with the Third Conference of the CPPA.

== First Convention ==
The First Convention of the CPPA was held in Cleveland at the city auditorium. Close to 600 delegates attended the proceeding representing international unions, state federations of labor, branches of cooperative societies, state branches and national officers of the Socialist, Farmer–Labor, and Progressive Parties as well as the Committee of 48, state and national affiliates of the Women's Committee on Political Action, and sundry individuals. Very few farmers were in attendance.

The Credentials Committee reported unfavorably on the credential of William Mahoney as an individual, while not denying the Minnesota Farmer–Labor Party a right to a seat, citing his acts during and after the St. Louis Conference as well as his active participation in the June 1924 St. Paul Convention of the Federated Farmer–Labor Party, a gathering perceived to have been an appendage of the Workers Party of America and previously condemned by the National Committee of the CPPA.

The National Committee had previously requested that Wisconsin Senator Robert M. La Follette make a run for the presidency. The Cleveland Convention was addressed by the Senator's son, Robert M. La Follette, Jr., who read a message from his father accepting the call and declaring that the time had come "for a militant political movement independent of the two old party organizations." La Follette declined to lead a third party, however, seeking to protect those progressives elected nominally as Republicans and Democrats. La Follette declared that the primary issue of the 1924 campaign was the breaking of the "combined power of the private monopoly system over the political and economic life of the American people." After the November election a new party might well be established, La Follette stated, around which all progressives could unite.

The National Committee was directed to issue a call for formation of a new national political party after the November election, to be held at a Special National Convention of the CPPA in January 1925. An extensive platform of the CPPA was adopted by the 1924 Convention. The National Committee was extensively enlarged.

== National Committee Meeting ==
The 54 member expanded National Committee met in Washington, DC, on December 12, 1924. The gathering had a mandate from the July First Convention to issue a call for a Convention to organize a new political party. The representatives of the railway unions on the National Committee, with the exception of William H. Johnston of the Machinists, were united in opposition to the gathering and they proposed a motion not to hold the 1925 organizational convention. This proposal was defeated by a vote of 30 to 13. Following their defeat on this question, the National Committee members withdrew, announcing that they would await further instructions from their respective organizations with regards to future participation.

A Founding Convention was scheduled by the National Committee for February 21–22, 1925, to be held in Chicago. Representation was to be on the same basis as that provided for in the call for the July 4, 1924, Convention.

Labor, the official organ of the railway unions, did nothing to promote this 2nd Convention of the CPPA, stating that since the executives of the various unions had taken no stance on the matter, it would be up to subordinate sections to consider sending delegates themselves.

== Second Convention ==
The Second Convention of the CPPA was called for February 21–22, 1925, to consider the formation of a permanent independent political party. The task was virtually insurmountable, however, as the heterogeneous organization had split over the fundamental question of realignment of the major parties via the primary process vs. establishment of a new competitive political body. The railway unions, whose efforts who had originally brought the CPPA into existence, were fairly solidly united against the third-party tactic, instead favoring continuation of the CPPA as a sort of pressure group for progressive change within the structure of the Democratic and Republican Parties.

The February 1925 Convention was attended by "several hundred delegates"—a number that will never be known precisely since the body voted for sine die adjournment before the report of the Credentials Committee was delivered.

L. E. Sheppard, President of the Order of Railway Conductors, presented a resolution calling for a continuation of the CPPA on non-partisan lines as a political pressure group. This proposal was met by an amendment by Morris Hillquit of the Socialist Party, who called the 5 million votes cast for La Follette an encouraging beginning and urged action for establishment of an American Labor Party on the British model—in which constituent groups retained their organizational autonomy within the larger umbrella organization. A third proposal was made by J.A.H. Hopkins of the Committee of 48, which called for establishment of a Progressive Party built around individual enrollments. No vote was ever taken by the convention on any of the three proposals mooted. Instead, after some debate, the convention was unanimously adjourned sine die—bringing an abrupt end to the Conference for Progressive Political Action.

Eugene V. Debs addressed a "mass meeting" including delegates of the convention in a keynote address delivered at the Lexington Hotel early in the afternoon of February 21. After the Debs speech, those delegates favoring establishment of a new political party were then reconvened, with the opponents of an independent political party departing.

The reconvened Founding Convention found itself split between adherents of a non-class Progressive Party based upon individual memberships as opposed to the Socialists' conception of a class-conscious Labor Party employing "direct affiliation" of "organizations of workers and farmers and of progressive political and educational groups who fully accept its program and principles." Following extensive debate, the Socialist counter-proposal was defeated by a vote of 93 to 64.

The body voted to allow the chair to appoint an executive committee of five to coordinate with local organizations in establishing a network of state groups. These state groups were to hold state conventions and these bodies were to elect delegates to a national convention "to be held at such time and place as such committee shall determine." These State Conventions were to also elect delegates to a governing National Committee—two delegates per state, one male and one female.

This "Progressive Party" survived for a short time in a limited number of states. It held no national convention in 1925 but continued an independent existence throughout the 1920s.
