= Mark H. Gehan =

American politician

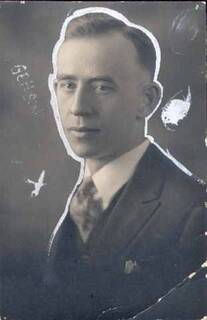
- Gehan in ~1925

39th Mayor of Saint Paul
- In office 1934–1938
- Preceded by: William Mahoney
- Succeeded by: John J. McDonough

Personal details
- Born: February 28, 1892 St. Paul, Minnesota
- Died: June 23, 1967 (aged 75) St. Paul, Minnesota

Mark H. Gehan (February 28, 1892 – June 23, 1967) was an American lawyer and politician.

Gehan was born in Saint Paul, Minnesota and lived in Saint Paul with his wife and family. He served in the United States Army during World War I. Gehan received his law degree from William Mitchell College of Law (formerly St. Paul College of Law). He practiced law in Saint Paul, Minnesota. Gehan served in the Minnesota House of Representatives from 1923 to 1928. He then served as Mayor of Saint Paul, Minnesota from 1934 to 1938. He died in Saint Paul, Minnesota and was buried in Fort Snelling National Cemetery.
