= William Mahoney (mayor) =

American mayor in Minnesota

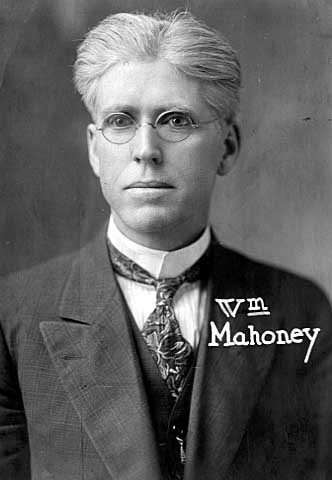
- Mahoney c. 1910

38th Mayor of Saint Paul, Minnesota
- In office 1932–1934
- Preceded by: Gerhard J. Bundlie
- Succeeded by: Mark H. Gehan

Personal details
- Born: January 13, 1869 Chicago, Illinois, U.S.
- Died: August 17, 1952 (aged 83) Saint Paul, Minnesota, U.S.
- Resting place: Sunset Memorial Park Cemetery, St. Anthony, Minnesota, U.S.
- Party: Farmer–Labor; Socialist Party of America

William Mahoney (January 13, 1869 – August 17, 1952) was a U.S. politician from the state of Minnesota.

Mahoney was born in Chicago, Illinois. He was an American of Irish descent. He was a member of the Knights of Pythias.

He was founder and editor of Minnesota Union Advocate from 1920 until 1932. Mahoney became friends with Laurence Hodgson despite their political disagreements. In 1922, the Farmer-Labor Party (FLP) considered a fusion ticket with the Minnesota Democratic Party. However, this was opposed by Mahoney, who was then the party's Committee Chairman.

Mahoney served as mayor of St. Paul from 1932 to 1934. He lost re-election to Mark H. Gehan.

Mahoney was a vocal member of the moderate wing of the FLP, and a notable supporter of governor Hjalmar Petersen. During Petersen's 1940 campaign, Mahoney became Petersen's unofficial campaign spokesman, even debating primary opponent Charles Egley, calling Egley's campaign 'communist-inspired'.

He is interred at Sunset Memorial Park Cemetery, St. Anthony, Minnesota.
