= Frogtown, Saint Paul, Minnesota =

Coordinates: 44°57′46″N 93°7′34″W

Thomas-Dale
- Neighborhood
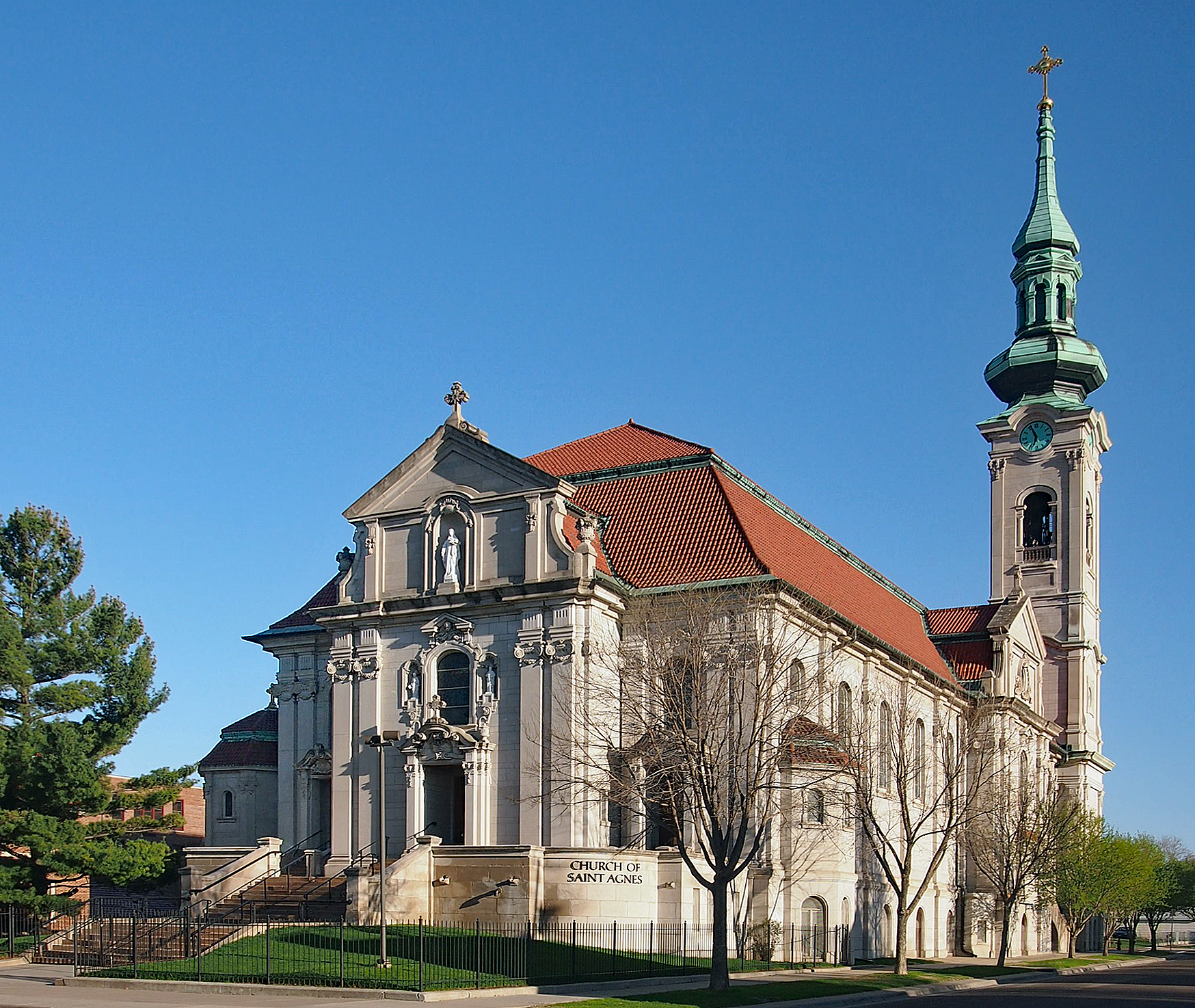
- The Church of St. Agnes, which is prominently visible in the center of the neighborhood.
- Nickname: Frogtown
- Interactive map of Thomas-Dale
- Country: United States
- State: Minnesota
- County: Ramsey
- City: Saint Paul

Area
  - Total: 1.714 sq mi (4.44 km^{2})

Population (2010)
  - Total: 17,049
  - Density: 9,947/sq mi (3,841/km^{2})
- Time zone: UTC-6 (CST)
  - Summer (DST): UTC-5 (CDT)
- ZIP code: 55101, 55103, 55104
- Area code: 651
- Website: http://www.frogtownmn.org/

Frogtown is a neighborhood in Saint Paul in the U.S. state of Minnesota. Built around University Avenue, the Thomas-Dale neighborhood is colloquially known as Frogtown (German: Froschberg, meaning "Frogmountain"). Historically, Frogtown was a subsection of the current Thomas-Dale neighborhood. Thomas-Dale is bordered by University Avenue on the south, the Burlington Northern Railroad tracks to the north, Lexington Parkway on the west and Rice Street on the east.

== Early settlement ==
The neighborhood was first settled 1860–1880 as the downtown area outgrew its borders. Workers on the St. Paul and Pacific Railroad, now BNSF Railway, which was built just to the north of the neighborhood sought housing nearby. Minnesota's first successful locomotive run occurred on these tracks in 1882. Shortly thereafter the Jackson Street Railroad Shops were built just northeast of Frogtown. The Jackson Street Shops were then joined by other railroad related industries in the area including the Saint Paul Foundry, built near Como and Western Avenues, providing additional employment opportunities for residents.

Residential development moved westward through the neighborhood as Polish, Scandinavian, German, and Irish immigrants took blue-collar jobs in the area. They built modest wood frame and brick houses on small lots in the neighborhood. Urban renewal has wiped out many of these homes, but working-class Victorian homes from the 1880s are extant, some adorned with arched window and door openings, brick window hoods, and frilly intact open porches.

The name "Frogtown" likely comes from the fact that the neighborhood was developed over several swamps and marshes, which were filled in over time. Archbishop John Ireland referred to the area as “Froschberg” or "Frog City” because of the many frogs in the area originating from the swamps.

== Commerce ==
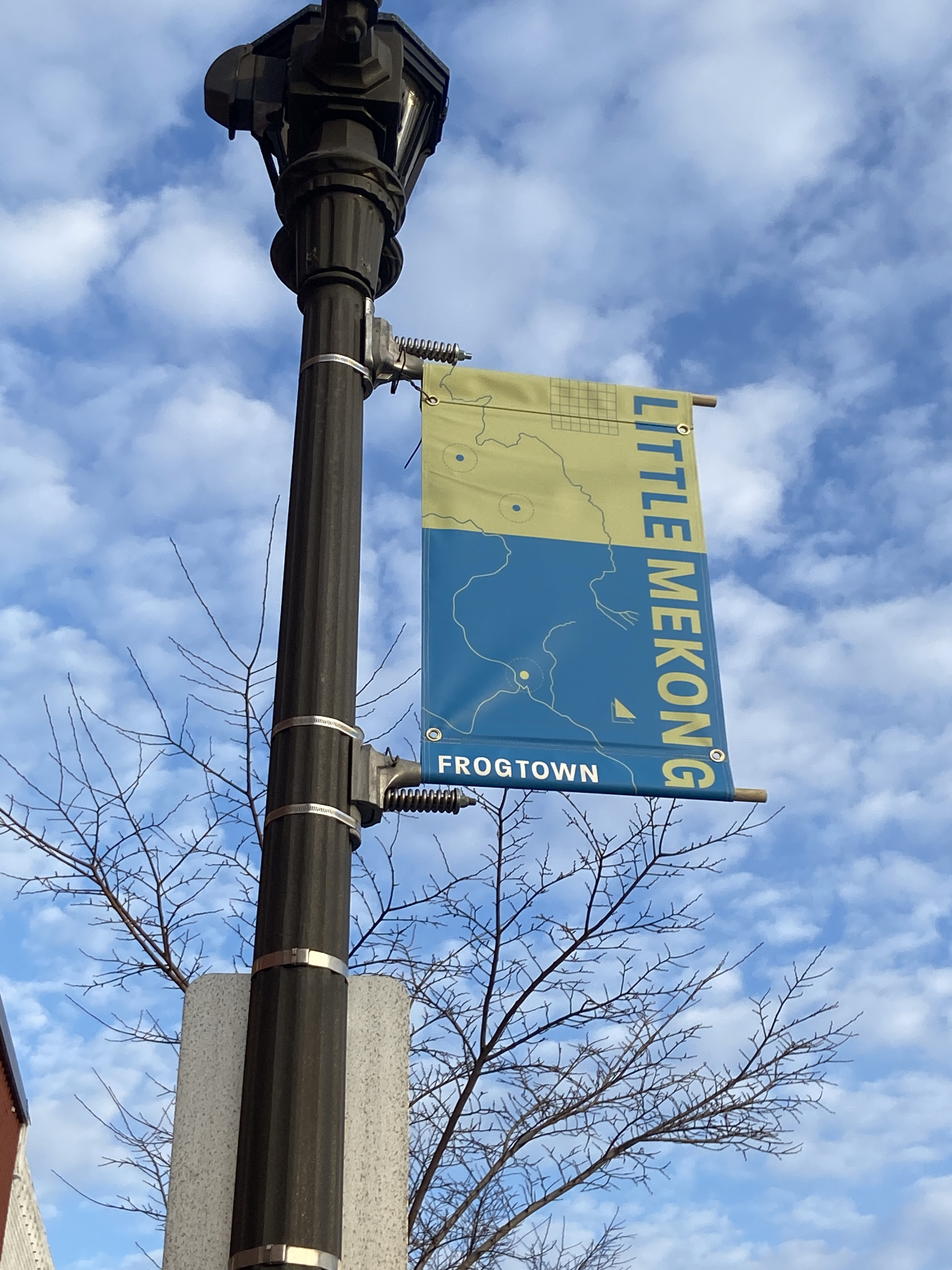
The University Avenue corridor through Frogtown is known as Little Mekong.

Commercial buildings lined University Avenue as street cars along the corridor were able to efficiently transport workers to employers. The line also became the first intercity street car line, connecting Minneapolis with Saint Paul in 1890.

In 1910, 817–823 University Avenue in Frogtown became home to Ray-Bell Films, which later became the largest film production company in Saint Paul. It made still and film images for local and national companies, municipalities, and other institutions. Companies served included Cargill, Northwest Airlines, Pillsbury Mills, Northrup-King, International Harvester, the Great Northern Railroad. Ray-Bell also produced films for the US Navy, Air Force, Office of Education, and Army Corps of Engineers. By the mid-1950s, the company employed 114 workers and had offices around the country.

Hmongtown Marketplace, a 200+ vendor Hmong-American mall and cultural center, is in Frogtown along Como Avenue. A Hmong cultural and business corridor along University Avenue in Frogtown is known as Little Mekong, named for the river many Hmong refugees crossed to Thailand.

== Today ==
A young Hmong-American woman selling produce at the Frogtown farmer's market

Today many view Frogtown as a new enclave for Vietnamese and now Hmong immigrants, who, in Saint Paul, comprise the largest urban contingent in the United States. Amenities include a full-service bank, gas station, community medical clinic, family services organizations, two parks, several Asian supermarkets, a traditional butcher shop, several convenience stores, the historic No.18 Fire Station.

Frogtown is the center of Saint Paul's immigrant communities, with very large populations of Hmong, Burmese, Vietnamese, Somali, and Ethiopian immigrants.

A profusion of immigrant-owned businesses line University Avenue, offering clothing, shoes, jewelry, household items, entertainment media (DVDs, CDs, video games) and groceries. Immigrants from Africa operate several Halal meat markets in the area, which also offer traditional African breads, spices and foodstuffs. Mexican-American immigrants operate small traditional Mexican carnicerías. The avenue is dotted with restaurants serving Cambodian, Thai, Laotian, Hmong, Vietnamese, Chinese-American, Somali, Ethiopian, and Mexican cuisine, some of it very authentic.

== Transportation ==
The METRO Green Line light rail, which opened on June 14, 2014, serves the neighborhood with stops on University Avenue at Victoria Street, Dale Street, and Western Avenue.

== Education ==
St. Paul Public Schools serves Frogtown. Some residents are zoned to Jackson Elementary, while some are zoned to Galtier Elementary. Some residents are zoned to Ramsey Middle, and some are zoned to Washington Middle. Some residents are zoned to Central High School, and some are zoned to Como Park High School.

The Catholic parish of St. Agnes also serves the area of Frogtown with its comprehensive elementary and high school (Saint Agnes School), classes of kindergarten through senior high school.

Saint Paul Public Library operates the Rondo Community Library adjacent to Frogtown. The newly renovated Rondo Library opened in late August 2006.
