= Hmongtown Marketplace =

Market and cultural hub in St. Paul, Minnesota

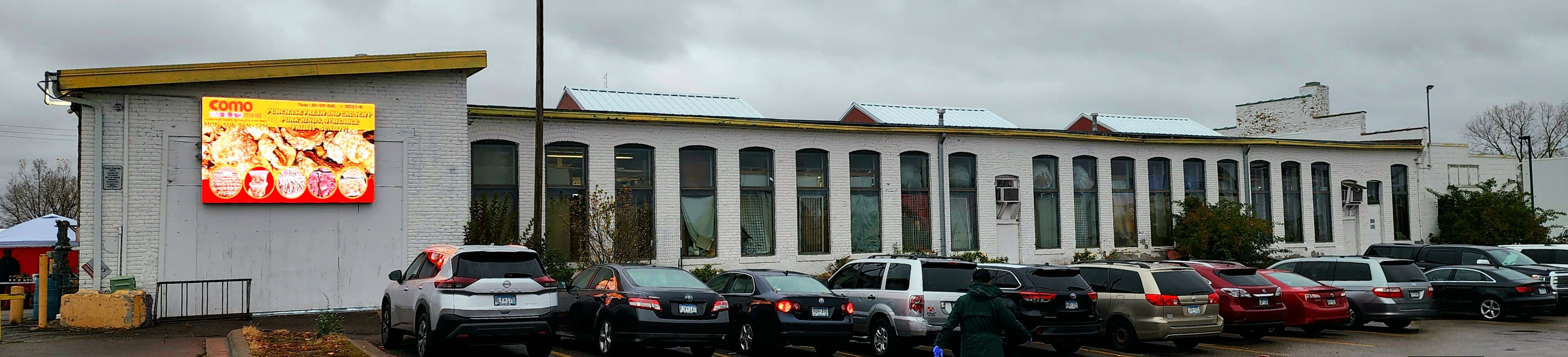
- Hmongtown Marketplace East Building as seen from the parking lot, facing North
- Location: Saint Paul, Minnesota, United States
- Coordinates: 44°57′41″N 93°06′34″W
- Address: 217 Como Ave, St Paul, MN 55103
- Opened: 2004
- Previous names: International Marketplace
- Manager: Jameson Liu
- Owner: Toua Xiong; Nou Xiong
- Num. of stores: 200–300
- Floor area: 6 acres (260,000 sq ft)
- Floors: 1
- Parking: 600
- Public transit: 3B, 67; Green Line Capitol/Rice Street station
- Website: hmongtownmarketplace.com
- Revenue: 287,501 United States dollar (2024)

Hmongtown Marketplace is an indoor-outdoor marketplace focused on Hmong American products and culture in the Frogtown neighborhood of Saint Paul, Minnesota. Hmongtown was the first Hmong-owned and operated marketplace in the United States and is today noted for its cuisine and produce.

Locally it is variously referred to as the Hmong Farmers Market or Hmong Flea Market, or simply "Hmongtown" to emphasize its role as a cultural hub like a Chinatown, not just a retail location.

== Description ==
Two buildings in north Frogtown at 217 Como Ave contain more than 200 vendors who sell traditional food, clothing, and home goods especially from Hmong and Hmong American culture, including from Cambodia, Vietnam, Laos and Thailand. The market is designed to simulate open-air markets in Chiang Mai, Thailand, and Vientiane, Laos. Produce vendors sell culturally specific fruits, vegetables, nuts, and other edible plants. Hot and ready-made food vendors sell a variety of dishes such as roast meats, boba tea, papaya salad, and bánh mì. Home goods include green market, electronics, religious supplies, and garden tools. A bank branch staffed by Hmong-speaking employees was added in 2024.

It's easy to forget, when you're walking past the crowded indoor stalls or outdoor vegetable stands in Hmongtown Marketplace that you're in the American Midwest. The sounds, smells, voices on TV and faces proclaim, "Southeast Asia!"

— Why you should visit St. Paul, Washington Post

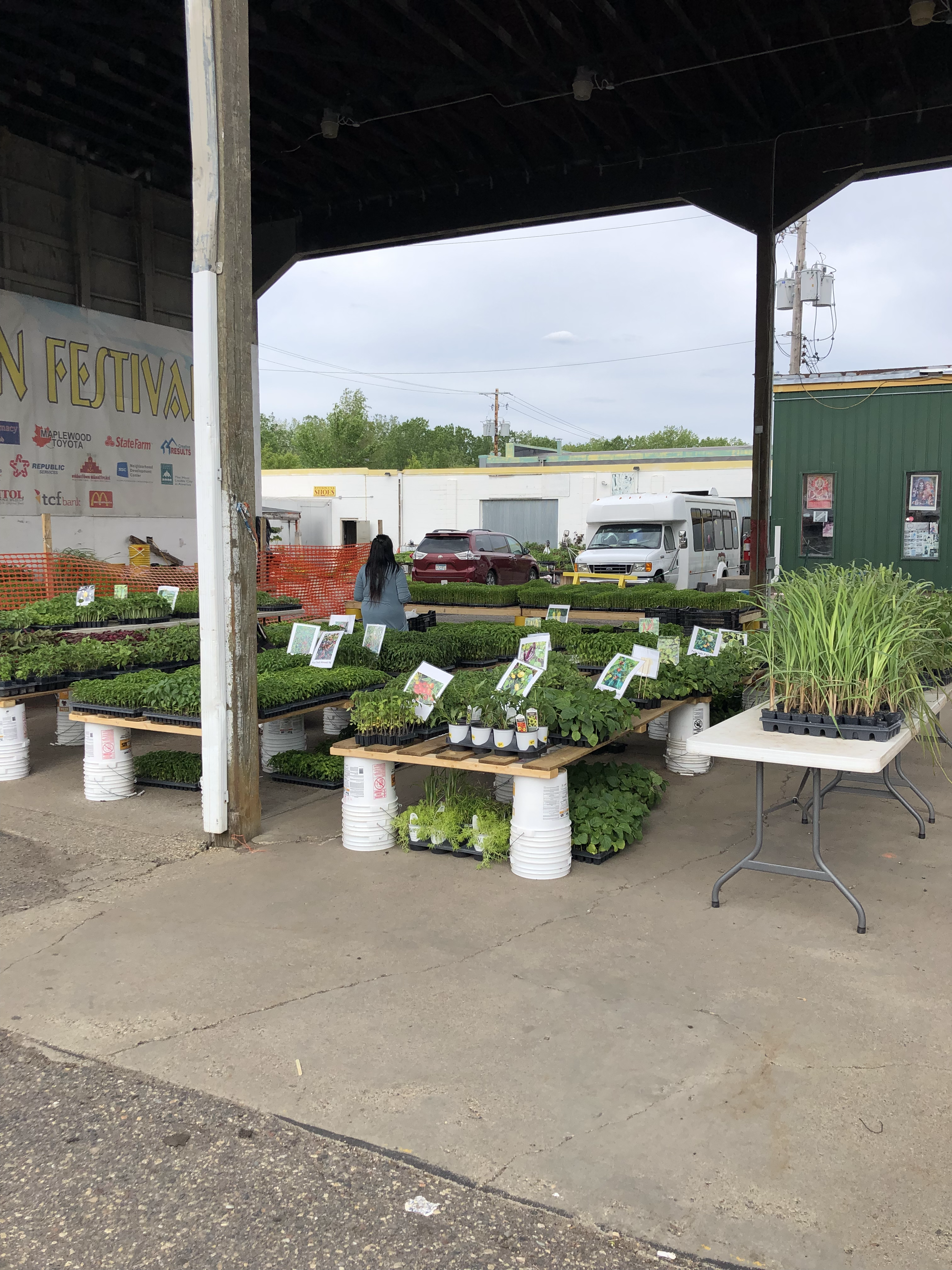
Outdoor summer market booth selling potted vegetable plants

In the summer the market nearly doubles in size with an outdoor market in the surrounding paved lot that brings the number of vendors up to 300 or more. The outdoor market is sometimes referred to as the Hmongtown Farmers Market and sells produce as well as meat, clothing and textiles, herbal medicine, live potted plants, and home products.

The large size and foot traffic have led to the nickname "Hmong Mall of America". 600 people work inside, as many as 20,000 customers have been noted during events, and there is capacity for more than 300 stalls. The interior footpath complexity due to the many stalls has been described as "labyrinthine" and "byzantine". Because of the wide variety of products and services offered at Hmongtown, it is referred to as many different kinds of markets, such as a mall, a supermarket, a flea market, a farmers market, a marketplace, and a food hall. Locally it is variously referred to as the Hmong Farmers Market or Hmong Flea Market, or simply "Hmongtown" to emphasize its role as a cultural hub like a Chinatown, not just a retail location.

=== Name ===
The idea of a "Hmongtown", so named as a Chinatown, has been documented in the Hmong American community for some time. In the 1997 book The Spirit Catches You and You Fall Down, which documents one Hmong refugee family's difficulty with the United States' healthcare system in the decade after Hmong began seeking refuge in the United States, author Anne Fadiman details a Hmong community leader in Merced, California named Blia Yao Moua who at one point pursued a Hmong American-oriented housing complex he called "Hmongtown" which would be designed to remind demoralized refugees of Laos. Hmong American poet Bryan Thao Worra describes Fresno as a Hmong American city alongside other ethnicities, and entitles the poem (and Fresno) Hmongtown.

Hmongtown founder Toua Xiong said in 2000, four years before Hmongtown was realized, that the goal of his neighborhood business ventures were to "turn Frogtown into Hmongtown". His marketplace concept was opened as International Marketplace in 2004, and renamed Hmongtown Marketplace in 2009. Xiong has since encouraged leaving "Marketplace" out of the name to emphasize Hmongtown as "[n]ot just a bazaar but a community unto itself."

== History ==
Hmongtown was the first Hmong-owned and operated marketplace in the United States. The market was founded as International Marketplace in 2004 by Saint Paul, Minnesota entrepreneurs and real estate developers Toua Xiong and Nou Xiong (née Vang). Hmong people were persecuted in their homelands following the Laotian Civil War known as the Secret War and the Xiongs wanted a place for first generation immigrants such as themselves to gather as though they were at home. The marketplace originally had many video stores that sold footage of and movies set in Laos and Thailand as part of that nostalgia. Hmongtown serves a similar role to the Minnesota Hmong community as Hmong villages and ethnic Hmong marketplaces in countries of origin such as Vietnam and Laos, which are cultural and social hubs.

Toua Xiong spent his childhood in Laos before his family escaped to a refugee camp. He, a younger brother, and his parents joined his teenage brothers in an American-run refugee camp when he was twelve. In 1986 at seventeen years old, he and his wife Nou Vang immigrated to St. Paul, Minnesota and settled in Frogtown. In three years he gained college degrees in business and accounting. He has a master's degree in accounting.

=== Foodsmart ===
External image
- Minneapolis Institute of Art collections
- Painted depiction of Foodsmart on a Hmong American business corridor Hmong American politician and artist Cy Thao includes Hmong businesses like Foodsmart in the upswing of Hmong American history: "After 25 years of being in America, our communities are beginning to take root. The children are getting a first rate education. Opportunities are beginning to open up. Hmong businesses are popping up everywhere. It’s a sign that we will make it here too."

Prior to opening Hmongtown, the Xiongs owned and operated the Asian grocery store Foodsmart (now doing business as Sun Foods), part of the Unidale Mall strip mall on University Avenue in Frogtown, with a second location in Brooklyn Park, Minnesota. Opened around 1996 with business loans, the grocery hosted an 80 stall farmers market in its parking lot, a ready-made hot food Thai and Hmong restaurant and buffet, an event hall, and a Hmong sausage processing facility which sold 700 pounds of sausage daily. Toua's goal was to "turn Frogtown into Hmongtown". (From 1981 to 2005, the number of Asian businesses on University Avenue in Frogtown grew from one business to more than sixty businesses.)

Foodsmart was involved in community initiatives: hosting the Council on Asian-Pacific Minnesotans get-out-the-vote events and community engagement about the Metro Transit light rail Central Corridor construction in 2007. Representatives from Foodsmart served on the Central Corridor Business Advisory Council. It hosted fundraisers for local Hmong institutions such as the Hmong Cultural Center Museum, which was founded during a meeting at Foodsmart.

The New York Times recommended Foodsmart's daily Hmong food buffet in 2002. Star Tribune recommended the Thai and Hmong food in 2001. Toua Xiong received a minority business leader award for Foodsmart from Minneapolis/St. Paul Business Journal in 2002.

The Xiongs moved on to develop the multi-vendor International Marketplace with a goal to provide Hmong with more economic opportunity.

=== International Marketplace ===
The 6-acre Hmongtown site was previously John Martin Lumber Company, and then Shaw Stewart Lumber Company at 217 Como Avenue in Saint Paul, north of the Saint Paul Capitol building. The two original buildings remain as the East Building and West Building. Toua Xiong didn't realize the obstacles to redeveloping the property for grocery and retail when he rented it from the lumber company, having only recently become a business owner and an English speaker. Renovations to meet regulations included a sprinkler system, more toilets, exhaust fans in restaurant spaces, and an upgraded larger sewer pipe to connect to the municipal system. Despite setbacks, he opened International Marketplace in 2004. It was one of the biggest Hmong-owned businesses in Minnesota.

On March 13, 2009, the Xiongs bought the property from the lumber company and renamed it Hmongtown Marketplace.

=== Impact ===
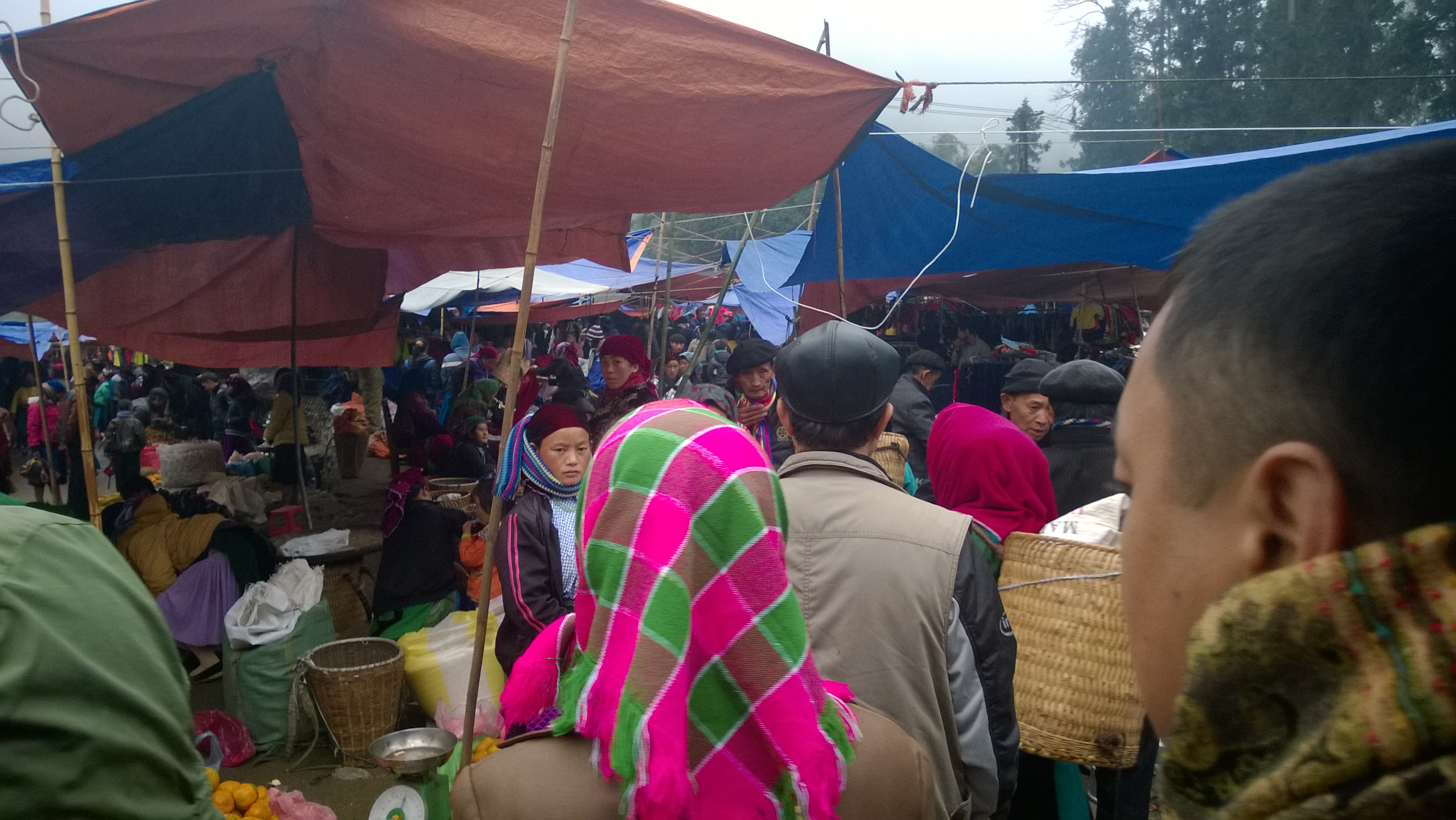
Hmong people at a marketplace in Ha Giang province, Vietnam

Soliel Ho for the upper Midwestern food magazine Heavy Table connects Hmongtown to wider Hmong American history and calls the marketplace "a manifestation of the Hmong community’s resilience in the face of persecution and displacement". Finance & Commerce dubbed Hmongtown a pioneer in the Asian-themed mall concept in the Twin Cities of Minnesota.

Hmongtown aimed to provide a social and economic hub to newly immigrated Hmong. It has been credited with creating hundreds of jobs and other entrepreneurial opportunities for much of the Minnesota Hmong diaspora. Most of the vendors speak only a Hmong dialect and not English, which Toua Xiong says has allowed them to maintain employment and start a business while still acclimating to America. Leases for stalls at the market filled quickly after launch, and the market has remained mostly or fully leased since then.

In 2010 Toua Xiong was awarded the Immigrant of Distinction award for his work at Hmongtown from the Minnesota-Dakotas chapter of the American Immigration Lawyers Association.

Hmongtown was featured in an Emmy Award-winning episode of CNN's United Shades of America with owner Toua Xiong and local Hmong American chef Yia Vang in 2019. Andrew Zimmern featured papaya salad, fried intestines, and bitter bamboo soup from Hmongtown on Bizarre Foods America in 2012, and the popular Hmong sausage with purple sticky rice meal on Bizarre Foods: Delicious Destinations in 2016.

== Culture ==
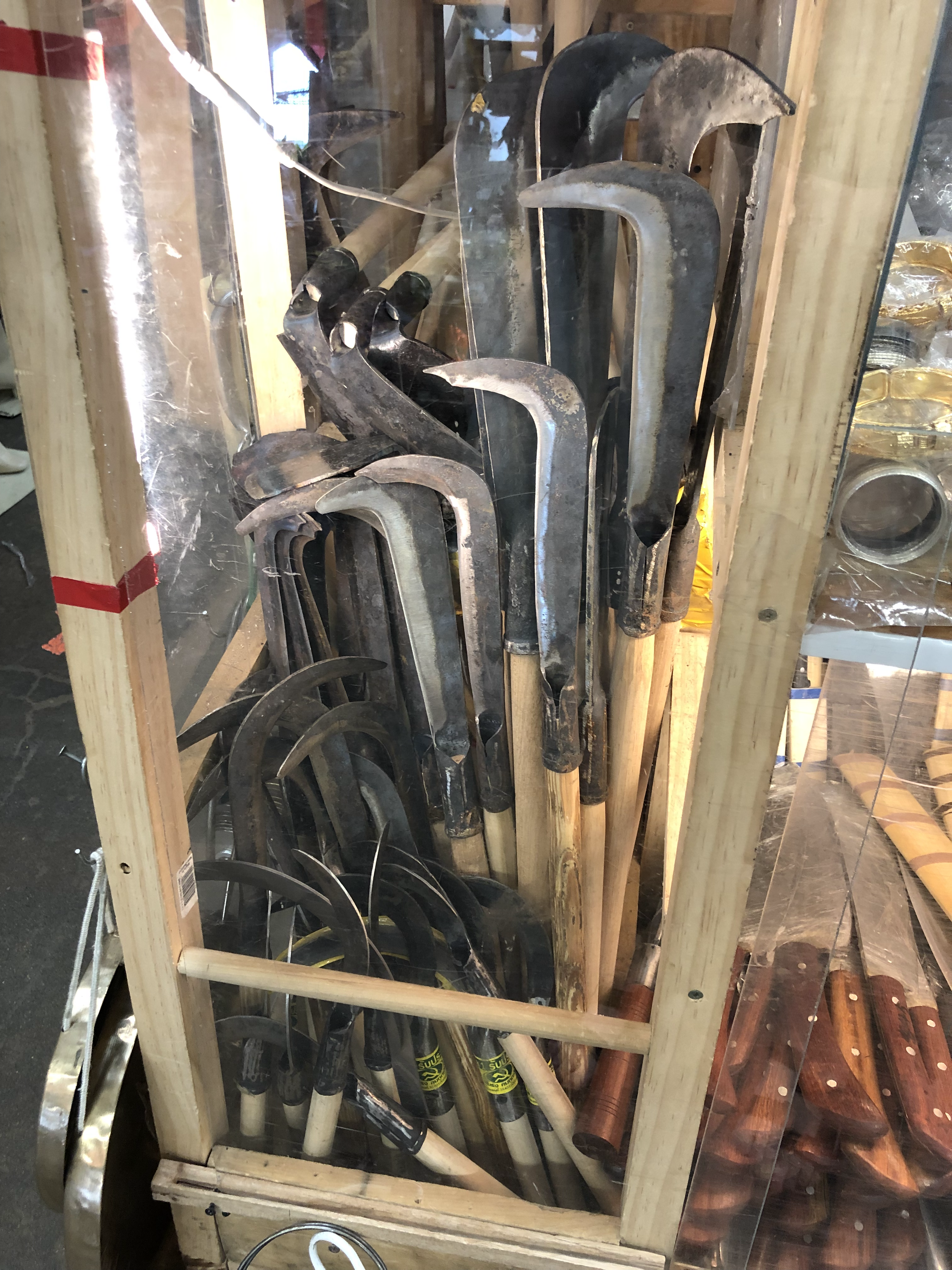
Hand-forged traditional Hmong garden tools for sale at a stall inside Hmongtown

Hmong are the largest Asian diaspora in Minnesota, and Minnesota has the second-largest Hmong population in the United States. Hmongtown is a staple of local Hmong life and creates a sense of community and belonging. Less than four miles away is a similar Hmong American marketplace called Hmong Village. The markets and surrounding Asian businesses are in the Little Mekong Cultural District, a business district with a high concentration of Asian businesses and cultural sites. A University of Minnesota study reported that marketplaces are part of the Hmong community's cultural capital which provide a range of unique economic and social benefits: marketplaces "not only provide cultural, socially familiar, and communal spaces for Hmong, but also economic opportunities for small-scale Hmong entrepreneurs."

While the focus is Hmong culture, the marketplace contains shops and stalls with proprietors and products from any of the cultures that can be found in the surrounding neighborhood Frogtown, which in the 20th century became the most ethnically diverse neighborhood in Saint Paul. Nepali, African American, and Mexican vendors have been noted. More than half of Hmongtown's visitors are white. Owner Toua Xiong aims for the market to be welcoming to those new to Hmong culture.

=== Art and crafts ===
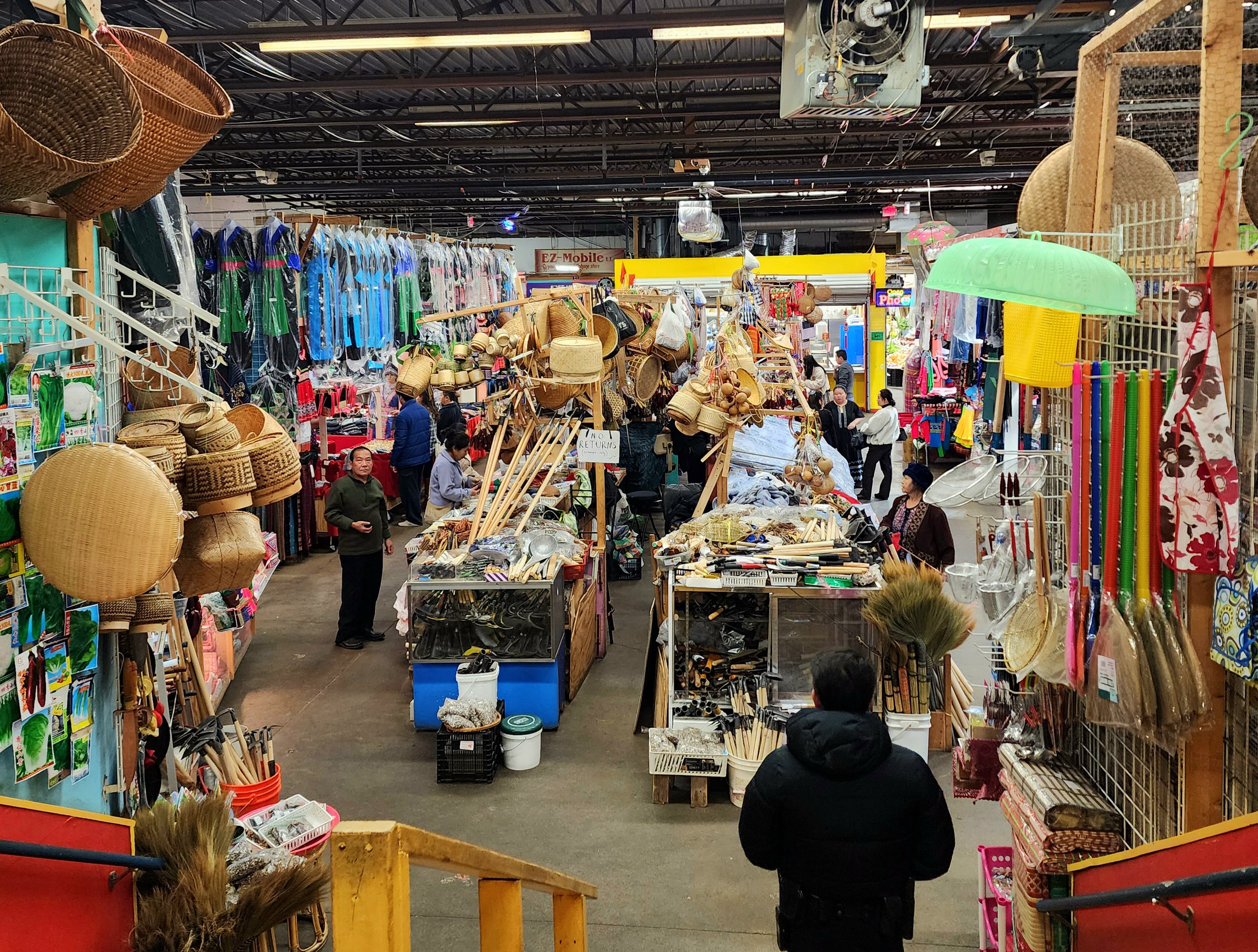
Stalls selling woven wares at Hmongtown's East Building.

Vendors at Hmongtown sell traditional Hmong textile art such as kawm (woven baskets) and forms of Paj Ntaub (flower cloth) such as batik dyed cloth (Paj Ntaub nraj ciab/cab) and story cloth, which depicts scenes from Hmong life and history. Basketry includes Blue Hmong baby carriers. Embroidery thread, coins, beads, metals, and other materials for making Hmong textiles are available from multiple vendors. Some textiles are made by relatives abroad in countries such as Laos where labor is cheaper, and are later sold by family at Hmongtown. As with the worldwide Hmong diaspora, cheaper traditional clothing using polyester is machine-made in China and imported for sale. More expensive handmade textile art includes hemp skirts, batik, story cloth, and Paj Ntaub. There has been a decline in handmade textiles at Hmongtown, especially handwoven hemp and batik dyed cloth.

Hmongtown provides a place to perpetuate Hmong culture such as textile art. A participant in a study on Hmong youth recalled how spending time at her mother's Hmongtown stall encouraged her to become a Hmong Paj Ntaub embroiderer: "Over winter break, my mom had a stall at Hmongtown Market so I went with her to help her. I was tired of not doing anything so I started embroidering again. That’s when I realized that if I did not continue to embroider then I would not know how to embroider in the future. And if I had children, they would not know as well, and if my sisters did not know how to embroider, there would be no one who would know." (Note: Quote originally in Hmong: "Over winter break, kuv mom mus ua tshav puam tim Hmongtown Market ces kuv mus nrog nws zov taj laj. Ces kuv laj laj nyob ces kuv rov ua paj ntaub dua. Ces thaum kuv ua ces xav tias yog kuv tsis ua tiag ces ntawm ntej no mus kuv yuav tsis paub. Thiab yog kuv muaj me nyuam, lawv yuav tsis paub thiab kuv cov viv ncaus yuav tsis paub ces peb yuav tsis muaj leeg twg paub ua lawm." Translated by the study's author.)

Ten story cloths by Hmongtown textile artisans Sy Vang Lo and Khang Vang Yang were exhibited at the Mathers Museum of World Cultures and the Northern Illinois University Pick Museum. Vang Lo led the Hmong Folk Art Center in Eagan, Minnesota and the traditional work of her family is included in the Minneapolis Institute of Art collection.

Light boxes of photography from Hmong American artist Pao Houa Her, whose work was selected for the Whitney Biennial, decorate the West Building food court seating area. The exhibit is accompanied by text from Hmong American poet and playwright May Lee-Yang. Her's artwork being displayed simultaneously at the renowned Walker Art Center and Hmongtown was praised by Walker's curatorial fellow in visual arts Matthew Miranda as a "break in the art world decorum" that "subverts the white view in museums."

Other featured artists have included Tetsuya Yamada, HOTTEA, and Ka Oskar Ly.

=== Cuisine ===
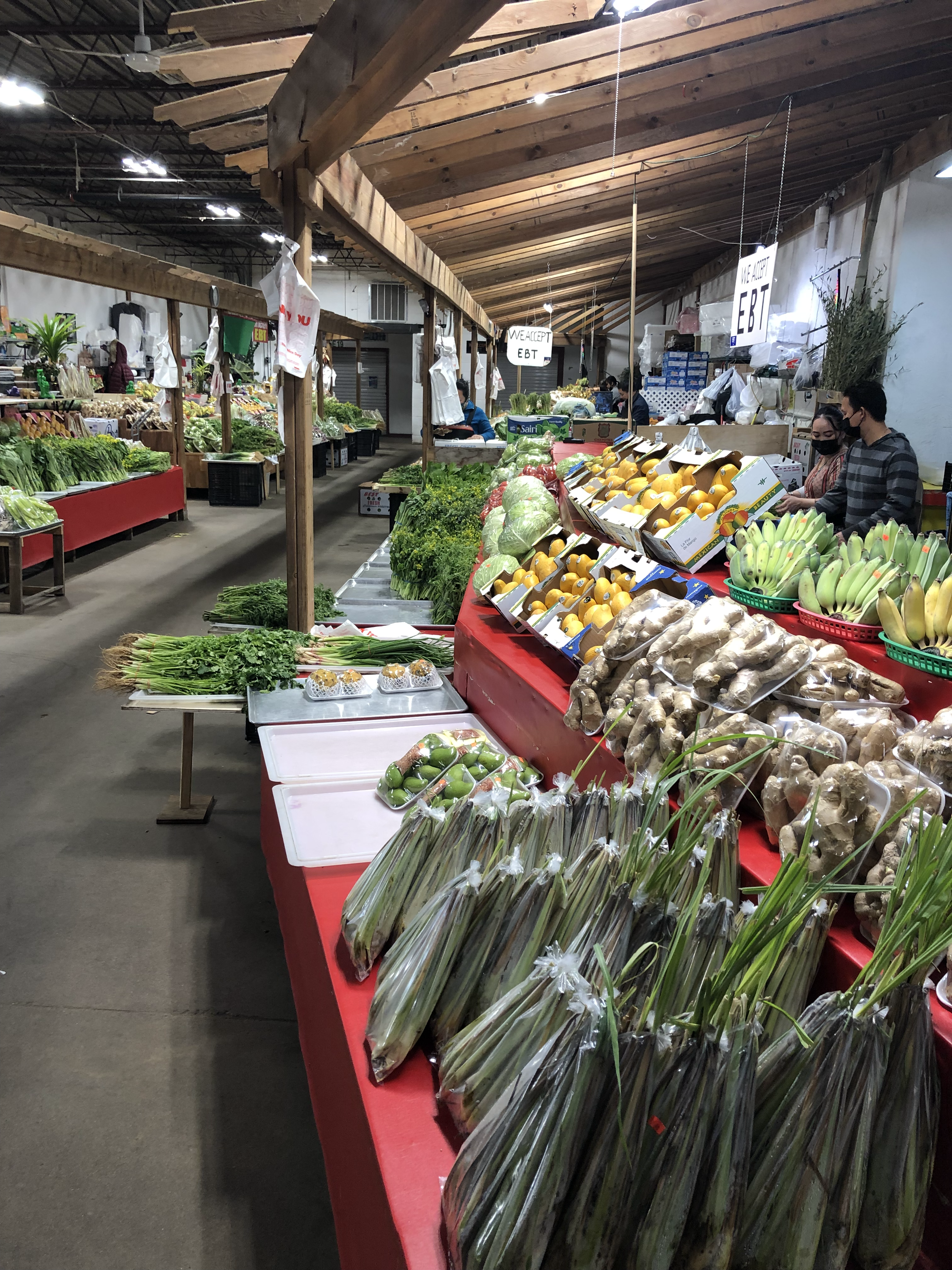
Stalls selling fresh produce at Hmongtown Marketplace

Hmongtown is noted for its prepared food and quality produce, with the Star Tribune calling it "one of the state's top culinary gems" and Saveur enthusing it is a "destination" for cooks. Soliel Ho for the upper Midwestern food magazine Heavy Table describes Hmongtown as "cavernous warehouses and outdoor stalls [...] filled to bursting with the material objects of Hmong-American culture, from traditional dress to buffalo-fighting DVDs to — inevitably — the food court". Italian travel outlet Latitudes dubbed Hmongtown imperdibili: "unmissable". Five-time James Beard Award-nominee Diane Moua recommends the prepared food. Food critic Andrew Zimmern says it is "the country’s best little-known ethnic market." Minnesota Monthly included Hmongtown in their "'culinary canon' of essential local eats" list the "Foodie 40", saying Hmongtown is "one of the great, affordable flavor adventures in the Twin Cities" and calling it "ground zero" for good chicken wings.

The market's food vendors have a reputation for catering to Hmong tastes and being affordable. The average price of a meal is less than $15 and restaurants are open all day for breakfast, lunch, and dinner. Individual restaurant stalls and a food court serve traditional Hmong and Southeast Asian meals, snacks, and street food. Because Hmong are a diaspora, Hmong cuisine is a fusion, so dishes at Hmongtown come from Thailand, Laos, Cambodia, Vietnam, and even China, Japan, South Korea, and Mexico. Difficult to find outside of Minnesota, Hmong-style barbecue is prominent, including traditionally prepared and cold Hmong sausage (nyhuv ntxwm hmoob), which is a pork sausage flavored with Thai chili and herbs like lemongrass, and sai krok, a traditional fermented pork sausage. Dishes popular among Hmong such as pho (or the Hmong version of pho called fawm), khaub poob (red curry noodle soup), larb (minced meat salad), nab vam (tapioca dessert), purple rice, boba tea, mangonada, and papaya salad are widely available from multiple restaurants.

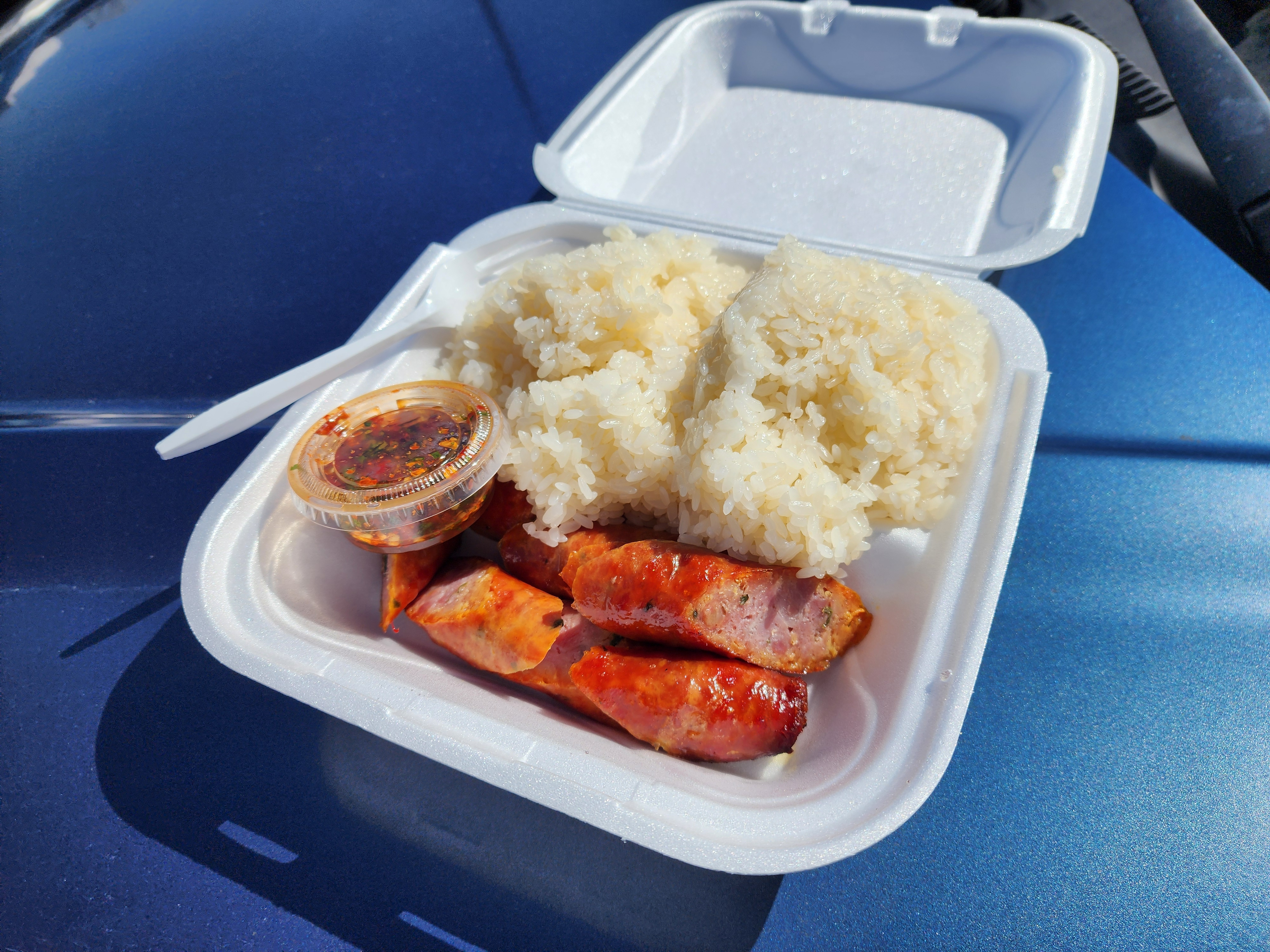
Hmong sausage meal from a food court vendor inside Hmongtown Marketplace's West Building

Notable vendors and dishes include:

- 5-Star Deli: fried chicken wings with egg roll stuffing (kooj tis qaib nitim); chicken meatball skewer; nab vam (colorful jelly and fruit dessert)
- Golden Cuisine: whole roast chicken larb
- Her Kitchen: beef pho
- Hmong Express Cuisine: papaya salad
- Hmobb Kitchen: mok pa (banana leaf steamed catfish)
- Hmoob Cafe: shellacked beef ribs; mustard greens with pork; mok pa; papaya salad
- Kad's Deli: jian dui (filled Chinese donut)
- Mr. Papaya: crispy pork belly, spiced green mango
- Mai's Kitchen: sai krok (fermented pork sausage)
- Sida Kitchen: foot-long Thai or Lao style Hmong sausage
- Twin Tropic Cafe: chocolate and blackberry smooth bubble teas; meatball soup (fawm)
- Xieng Khoung Kitchen: spring rolls

Hmongtown is recommended for its cuisine in many travel guides such as Lonely Planet, Condé Nast Traveler, and Camping World publication Wildsam Field Guides.

An outdoor market that sells much of the same merchandise as the indoor market operates from May to October. It has an emphasis on fresh produce and starter plants for gardening vegetables.

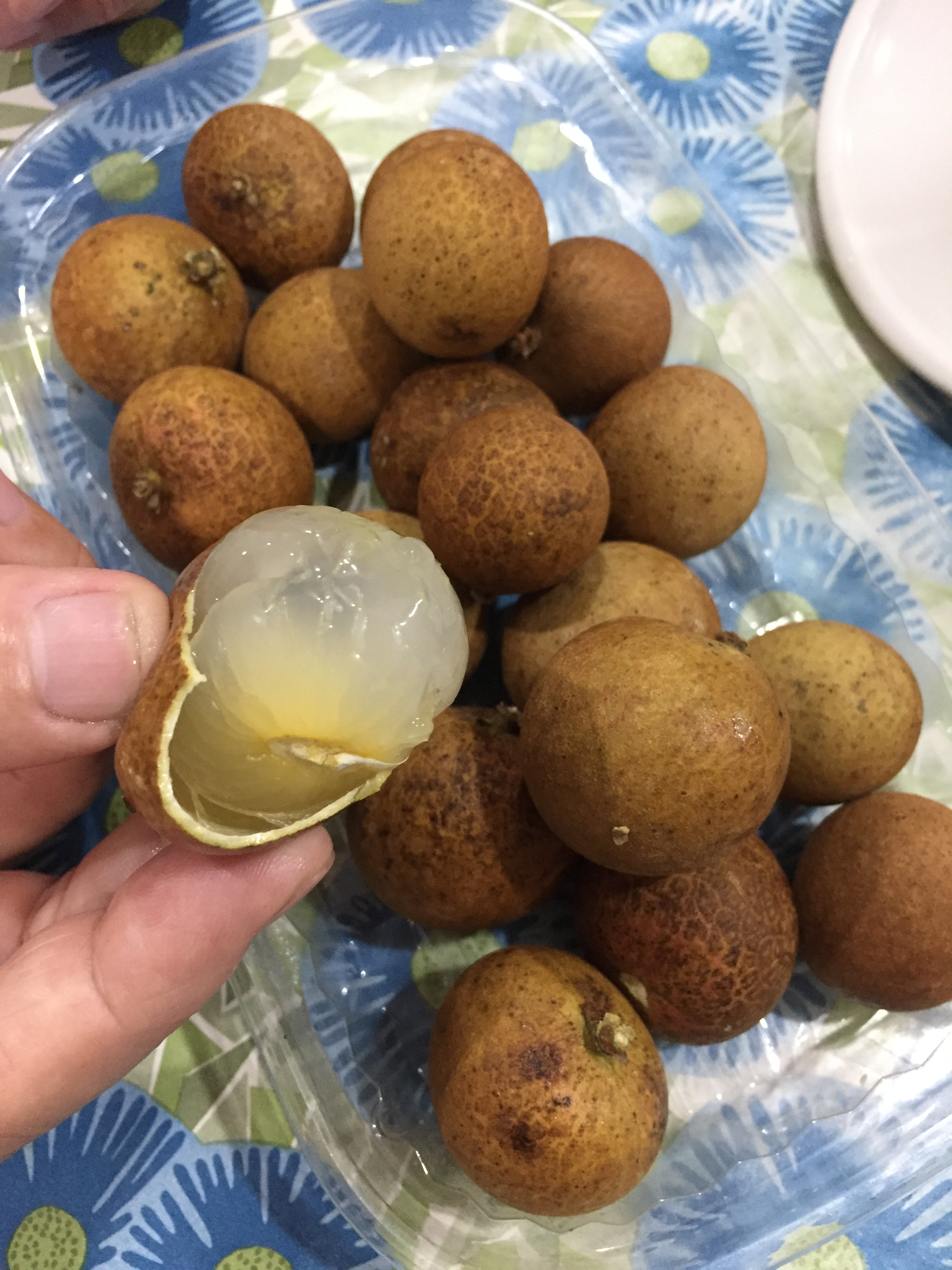
Longan such as those sold at Hmongtown

Produce commonly available at Hmongtown has Southeast Asian origins and is difficult to find in mainstream groceries. A large portion of the produce is locally grown by Hmong farmers.

Produce includes rambutan, Hmong yellow and red cucumbers, bitter melon, purple lemongrass, sugar cane, Thai chili, pea eggplant, dried imported bamboo, winter melon, radish greens, bok choy varieties such as Shanghai bok choy, Chinese broccoli, Thai basil, longan, lychee, pomelo, mangosteen, persimmon, okra, and jackfruit.

In Kao Kalia Yang's 2024 middle grade novel The Diamond Explorer, a Hmong boy describes his aunt and uncle's produce stall at Hmongtown as selling "Hmong cilantro, green onions with purple bulbs, fat Hmong cucumbers, Hmong mustard greens, and red and green bird’s-eye chili peppers."

=== Events ===
In June 2016 Hmongtown held the first Hmongtown Festival, a two-day music and cultural festival focusing on Hmong history and culture. The festival is held annually. Owner Toua Xiong who learned to sing and play guitar in a refugee camp played at the first festival. Minnesota Governor Tim Walz and Lieutenant Governor Peggy Flanagan took part in the festival in 2019.

=== Health ===
Hmongtown vendors sell traditional Hmong and Southeast Asian medicine such as herbs and imported over the counter drugs. Traditional Hmong herbal medicine is difficult to find, so vendors at Hmongtown attract customers from all over the world and play a role in preserving Hmong culture. Local hospitals such as M Health Fairview and Regions Hospital purchase post-partum Hmong herbs from Hmongtown as part of an effort to improve birth outcomes with culturally competent care.

Because of its reputation as a Hmong community hub, Hmongtown is often targeted for public health initiatives. Hmongtown participates in outreach around testing for breast cancer and reducing consumption of heavy metals from skin lightening products and fish. The market also held vaccine clinics during the beginning of the COVID-19 pandemic.

==== 2013 federal drug raid ====
In June 2013, law enforcement raided Hmongtown and confiscated hundreds of pounds of illegal medication, including penicillin, opiates, and mislabeled over the counter medication. Vendors were subjected to full body searches. Cultural differences and language barriers were blamed, although Ramsey County Sheriff's office spokesperson Randy Gustafson said that vendors had been previously warned against selling the products confiscated. Fourteen vendors were ultimately charged with "selling misbranded drugs, possessing and selling drugs that require a license, selling syringes, and unlawfully possessing poison."

Local Hmong commentators criticized how the raid was executed by authorities and disagreed about the speculated causes. Tiffany Vang in an op-ed for Twin Cities Daily Planet claimed that Hmongtown vendors knew the products were illegal and that modern pharmaceuticals can't be excused as traditional medicine. Instead, vendors continued to sell the illegal products because they made money off the Hmong customers who were unable to afford mainstream medical care and were wary of it besides. "It's not cultural, and it’s not a communication problem; this is an issue of unethical business practices, lack of strict enforcement of regulation and guidelines, and poverty." Sia Her, then-executive director of the Minnesota state Council on Asian Pacific Minnesotans, concurred that many Hmong lack the income for health expenses, but said that vendors were selling drugs the way they were used by elder Hmong when they lived in Laos or Thailand, as part of traditional medicine.

The Minnesota Department of Health started an educational series with Hmongtown vendors to explain drug safety and American regulations in response. A similar incident occurred at the nearby Hmong Village shopping center in 2018.

== Expansion ==
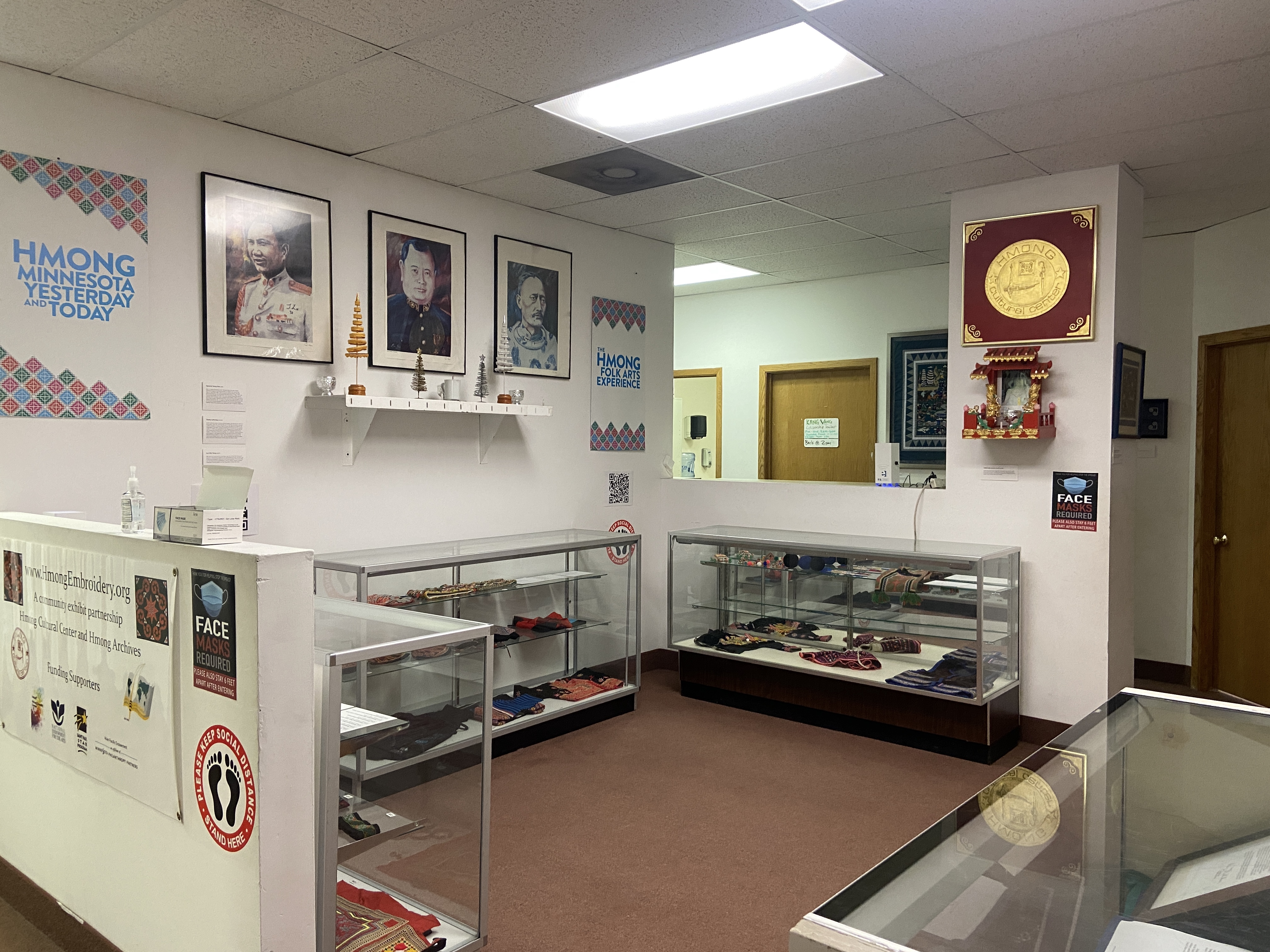
Hmong Cultural Center Museum

Hmongtown plans to expand to Hmong senior daycare and senior housing, and include more Hmong cultural activities such as an art gallery, music performance, and permanent history exhibits. Underground parking and an office building are also planned. In 2018 a joint state grant was issued to Hmongtown and the Saint Paul Port Authority to investigate the rehabilitation potential of a contaminated lot for future residential and commercial mixed use.

Off-site expansion includes nonprofits and museums. Through Hi Hi LLC, Toua Xiong and his wife Nou Xiong founded a Hmong and Karen cultural center and museum a few blocks from Hmongtown. He also runs Hmongtown Connections, a cultural exchange program that runs Hmongtown Festival.

=== Pan Asian Center ===
In 2025, Xiong plans to open a second Hmongtown location in the former Sears space at the Maplewood Mall. The 14 acre space would be developed into a marketplace and additional services aimed at younger customers than the original Hmongtown targets. The sale of the Sears site was finalized December 2024. According to a February 2025 interview with Ben Hamd, who is the managing director of Brookwood Capital Advisors, which owns the center parcel of Maplewood Mall, the opening is delayed by "financial hurdles".

Originally branded "Hmongtown 2", developers presented a revised concept called Pan Asian Center to the City of Maplewood and proposed a phased approach to development in February 2025. The mall's Macy's, which closed earlier in the year, was purchased by a joint group including Hmongtown on March 21, 2025.

The announcement for the second Hmongtown location was one of 2024's top stories in the Hmong community newspaper Hmong Times.

== Similar markets ==
Large marketplace-style businesses catering to Hmong vendors exist in the three major hubs of Hmong American population in the US: Saint Paul, Fresno, and Milwaukee. Hmong Village Shopping Center opened four miles from Hmongtown in Saint Paul in 2009. With more than 200 permanent vendor stalls, it became the largest Hmong marketplace in the US. A group of Hmong American entrepreneurs designed it to offer a similar experience, with a large warehouse renting individual stalls to vendors to sell goods and services. It is also known for its food and produce.

Milwaukee Hmong entrepreneurs founded Asian Market Phongsavan (also known as 5XEN Super Asian Market) in 2009, which hosts 70 vendor stalls and restaurants. In 2014 the Pacific Produce grocery store in Milwaukee, Wisconsin renovated part of their warehouse store into Hmong Town Market, which hosted ready-made food stands run by Wisconsin Hmong American entrepreneurs.

== See also ==
- History of the Hmong in Minneapolis–Saint Paul
- Hmong customs and culture
- Hmong cuisine
