= Unidale Mall =

Commercial area in Saint Paul, Minnesota

Coordinates: 44°57′17″N 93°7′28″W

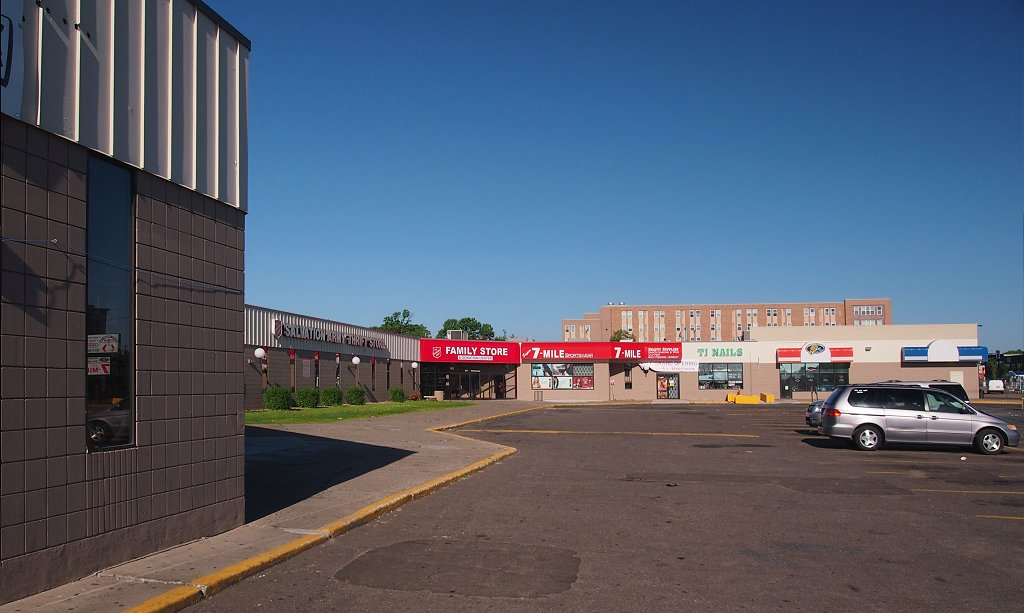
Unidale Mall looking west-southwest

The Unidale Mall is a shopping mall located at the intersection of University Avenue and Dale Street in Saint Paul, Minnesota, United States. The mall is in the Summit-University neighborhood just across from the Frogtown neighborhood. The Rondo Community Outreach Library is west across Dale Street. The Dale Street station on the Green Line is also at the intersection.

The idea for the mall was first started in 1971 as part of the Model Cities Program. The project's ideal result was to create a suburban shopping mall in the heart of the city. The project was pushed by neighborhood activists on city planners. Construction of the mall was completed in 1978 with the mall losing money from 1979 to 1989. In 1987 there were plans to move a nightclub and restaurant to the mall. The mall was owned and operated by Kraus-Anderson in 1988. The anchor of the store in 1989 was the Disabled American Veterans Thrift Store. Plans were brought up in 1989 to do a $6.3 million renovation so the mall could host "United Noodles Oriental Food Inc., a drug store, a food court, and several specialty shops."

A 1989 report on the surrounding neighborhood described the mall has a failure and noted the mall's perennial problem of finding suitable tenants. The tenants, such as a welfare office were not the type originally intended. The mall was described as nearly empty 1992 article detailing the problems the surrounding community faced. The mall appeared to be faring better in 2000 when the vice-president of Kraus-Anderson described the mall as fully leased. Sun Foods Asian grocery has hosted a farmers' market on weekends in the parking lot since 1998.

The Saint Paul Public Schools district had plans to purchase the property to host adult literacy education and multicultural programs. The Saint Paul Area Learning Center moved to Unidale Mall on February 1, 1991. Those programs eventually moved out of the mall and became Gordon Parks High School.

== Other reading ==
- "BEST 'DALE - 2000 Unidale Mall". City Pages.
- "The Uni-Dale Mall Redevelopment Plan" (PDF).
