= Dale Street station =

Light rail station in Saint Paul, Minnesota

Dale Street
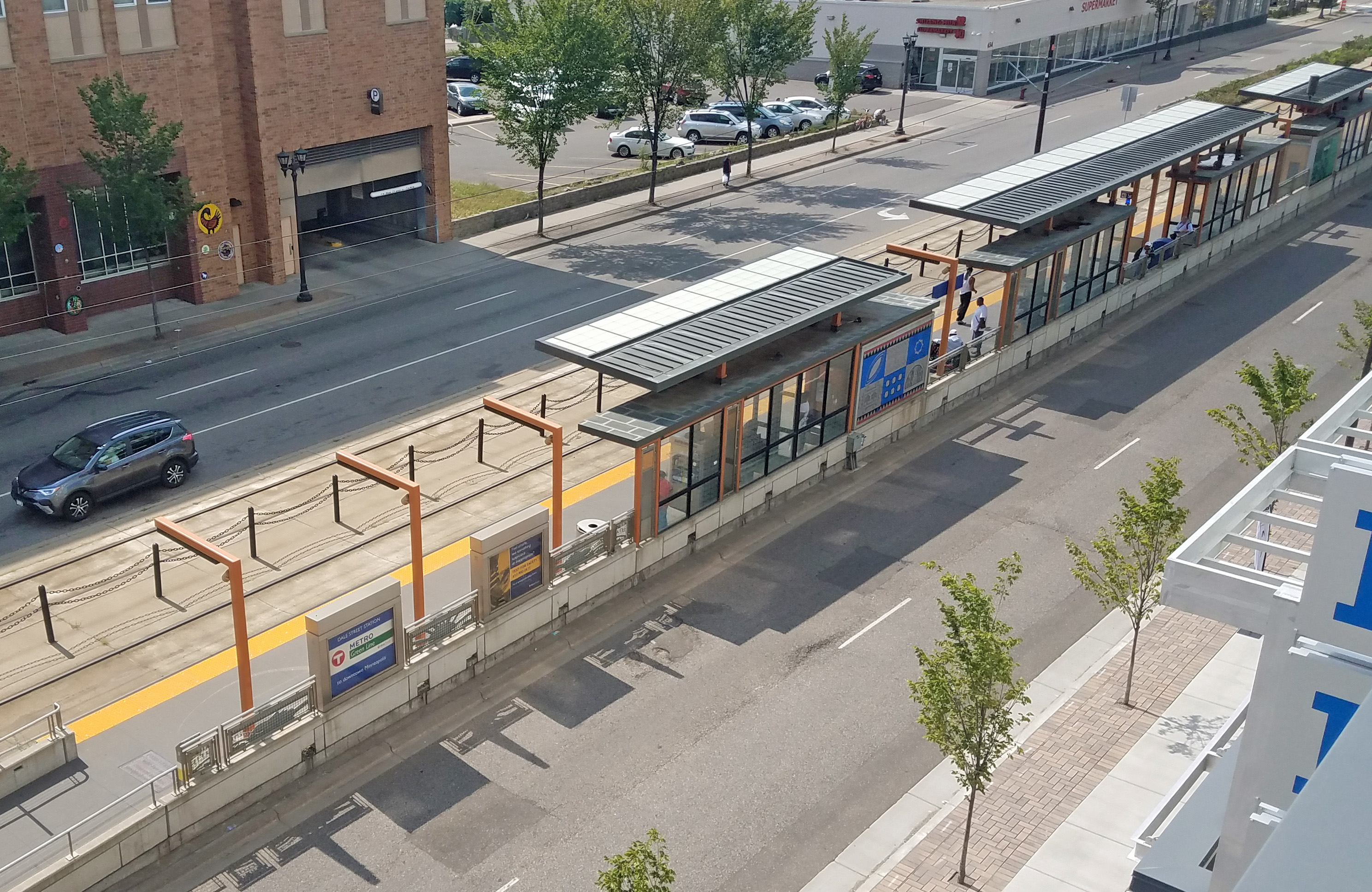
- Dale Street station platform in 2022

General information
- Location: 616 University Avenue West (Eastbound); 641 University Avenue West (Westbound); Saint Paul, Minnesota
- Coordinates: 44°57′21″N 93°07′35″W
- Owner: Metro Transit
- Platforms: 2 split side platforms
- Tracks: 2
- Connections: Metro Transit: 65

Construction
- Structure type: At-grade
- Cycle facilities: Nice Ride station
- Accessible: Yes

History
- Opened: June 14, 2014

Passengers
- 2025: 964 daily ▼22.8%
- Rank: 19 out of 37

Services
Preceding station	Metro	Following station
Victoria Street toward Target Field	Green Line	Western Avenue toward Saint Paul Union Depot
Location

Dale Street station is a light rail station along the Metro Green Line in Saint Paul, Minnesota. It is located along University Avenue on both sides of the intersection with Dale Street. The station has split side platforms, with the westbound platform on the north side of the tracks west of Dale and the eastbound platform on the south side of the tracks east of Dale.

Construction in this area was expected to begin in 2012. The station opened along with the rest of the line in 2014.

The station is located on the edge of the Frogtown and Summit-University neighborhoods. In the southwest corner of the intersection is the Rondo Community Outreach Library, which opened in 2006 on the site that formerly held the Faust Theatre. After several decades of traditional operation, the Faust Theatre began showing X-Rated films before being shut down in the 1980s. The northwest corner was redeveloped and opened in 2021 as Frogtown Crossroads with space for affordable housing, offices, and business incubator spaces. The northeast corner was developed into a mixed-use building with commercial spaces on the first floor and senior housing above it in 2011 as Frogtown Square. In the southeast corner is Unidale Mall.
