= Josie R. Johnson =

African American civil rights activist

- Born: October 7, 1930; San Antonio
- Education: Fisk University, University of Massachusetts Amherst
- Occupation: Academic administrator

Josie Robinson Johnson (born October 7, 1930) is an American community organizer and activist for African American rights. Described by the Minneapolis Star Tribune as the "First Lady of Minnesota Civil Rights," she was instrumental in the success of a fair housing bill in Minnesota in 1962. The first Black person appointed to the University of Minnesota Board of Regents, Johnson has been a lifelong advocate for equity in housing, education, and voting rights.

== Early life and education ==
Josie Robinson was born in San Antonio, Texas, on October 7, 1930. She grew up in Houston, Texas and worked for her grandmother at a pharmacy in West Houston. Johnson credited her family with her strong sense of justice, describing her heritage as "wonderfully strong, hard-working, independent women."

As a teenager, Johnson and her father went door to door gathering signatures on a petition against a poll tax. Johnson would accompany her mother in visits to tutor illiterate white women in their kitchens.

Johnson attended Fisk University and earned a bachelor's degree in sociology in 1951. She met her husband, Charles W. Johnson, while at Fisk. He was hired as an engineer by Honeywell in 1956 and they moved to Minneapolis; they had three daughters together. She also received a master's of arts and a doctor of education degree at the University of Massachusetts Amherst.

== Activism ==
After moving to Minnesota, she became a community organizer for the local affiliate office of the Urban League, holding the acting director position from 1967 to 1968, and became active in the Minnesota Democratic–Farmer–Labor Party. Johnson began advocating against housing discrimination with fellow St. Paul activist Katie McWatt in the 1960s. She was an officer in the Minneapolis chapter of the NAACP and held a position in the Minneapolis chapter of Jack and Jill of America, an organization dedicated to improving the quality of life for children. Johnson worked with the League of Women Voters in Minnesota in collaboration with Black and Jewish neighborhood associations to set up Fair Employment Practice Commissions in Minneapolis, St. Paul, and Minnesota. She was the first Black woman to be appointed to the National Board of the League of Women Voters.

She was particularly adept at behind-the-scenes politicking. During the Minnesota legislative session of 1961, she lobbied every day at the State Capitol building for fair housing. When the bill she was promoting was stagnating in a state Senate committee, she visited Governor Elmer Andersen. The bill moved forward with the governor's support and was the first state fair housing bill passed in the United States.

Johnson led the Minnesota delegation for the August 1963 March on Washington for Jobs and Freedom in Washington, D.C. She also traveled to Mississippi in 1964 with an interfaith, interracial delegation of women called Wednesdays in Mississippi, taking part in the Freedom Summer campaign to provide support and supplies to civil rights workers and black families. The group Johnson was traveling with visited a freedom school in Vicksburg, Mississippi, which was bombed later that same day.

She worked as a mayoral aide for Arthur Naftalin in Minneapolis in 1968, when racial tensions were high in the city, acting as a community liaison. U.S. Senator Walter Mondale described Johnson's activism during the 1960s:

"She was in many ways the pre-eminent civil rights leader in Minnesota for all those years. She'd seen it all. [...] But underneath all that kindness, there's also a tough Josie Johnson that gets her agenda done. If you want to fight with her, she'll be very nice about it, but you'll be sorry you got in a fight because you're going to lose."

She left Minnesota for several years to take a number of significant political roles. From 1975 to 1978, she was the chief of staff to the lieutenant governor of Colorado. In 1978 she supervised the campaign staff for Judson Robinson in Texas. Johnson also spent time in Tennessee in 1980, serving as the deputy campaign manager for the 1980 campaign for President Jimmy Carter.

=== Activism in education ===
In the late 1960s and 1970s, Johnson expanded her efforts to improving education. From 1971 to 1973, she served as the first African American member of the Board of Regents of the University of Minnesota. When the Minnesota Student Mobilization Committee organized a rally protesting the Vietnam War in 1973, Johnson addressed the crowd, urging students to commit to long-term activism to make substantive changes to society.

She helped found the African American Studies department at the University of Minnesota and taught as one of the first faculty members, teaching a course on Black families in white America. Johnson joined the faculty of the university's college of education in the 1980s as well as serving as a senior fellow at the Hubert H. Humphrey Institute of Public Affairs. From 1990 to 1992 Johnson was the diversity director of the All-University Forum. In 1992 she was appointed associate vice president for academic affairs, leading the school's diversity efforts. She held that position until retiring from the university in 1996.

=== Later activism ===
Johnson was a superdelegate for Minnesota at the 2008 Democratic National Convention where she cast her vote for Barack Obama. She has served on the board of trustees for the Minneapolis Institute of Arts and other Minnesota organizations.

Into her late 80s, she continued to be politically active, participating in Black Lives Matter protests and urging reform. Interviewed about the 2020 murder of George Floyd, she discussed the historical context around the protests in the continued fight for equal opportunities for African Americans.

== Awards and legacy ==
Some of the notable awards Johnson has received include the Committed to the Vision Award from the Minneapolis Civil Rights Department, as well as the African American Community Endowment Fund Award.

The University of Minnesota established the Josie Robinson Johnson Human Rights and Social Justice Award in 1997.

In 2018, the University of Minnesota Humphrey School of Public Affairs established the Josie Robinson Johnson Fellowship for students focusing on racial inequities and injustice. The same year, civil rights leader Vernon Jordan lauded Johnson at an event in her honor:

"Whatever success I may have had, I owe in part to Josie Johnson — her loyalty, her friendship, her council, her commitment. But I am also here to say that the only way to do justice to Josie's life and career — to honor all the progress she has helped to achieve — is to put her accomplishments in a context that is measured not in minutes, but centuries. Josie, you are the Sojourner Truth and Harriet Tubman of our time."

Her 2019 memoir, Hope in the Struggle, provides insights into her life's work as well as the racial history of the Twin Cities.
