= Central station (Metro Transit) =

Light rail station in Saint Paul, Minnesota

Central
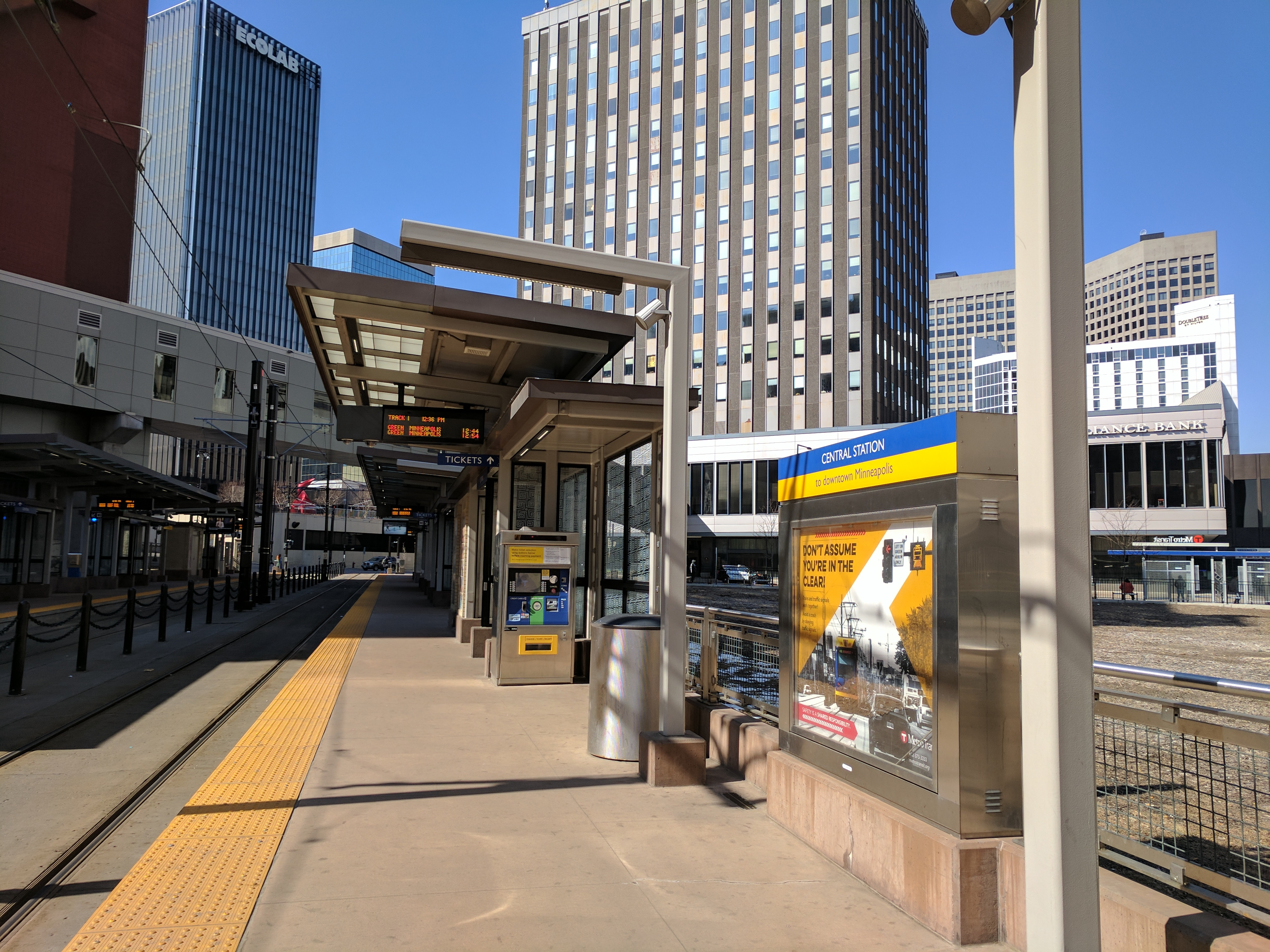
- Central station platform in 2017

General information
- Location: 56 Fifth Street East; Saint Paul, Minnesota
- Coordinates: 44°56′46″N 93°5′32″W
- Owner: Metro Transit
- Platforms: 2 side platforms
- Tracks: 2
- Connections: Metro Transit: 3, 21, 54, 61, 62, 63, 64, 68, 71, 74, 75, 94

Construction
- Structure type: At-grade
- Accessible: Yes

Other information
- Fare zone: Downtown

History
- Opened: June 14, 2014
- Former names: 4th & Cedar

Passengers
- 2025: 1,277 daily ▼9.1%
- Rank: 14 out of 37

Services
| Preceding station | Metro | Following station |
|---|---|---|
| 10th Street toward Target Field | Green Line | Saint Paul Union Depot Terminus |
Location

Central station (known as 4th & Cedar during planning) is a light rail station along the Green Line in Saint Paul, Minnesota. It is unique among Central Corridor stations in that it is not located in the middle of or directly adjacent to a road, but rather at a 45° angle to surrounding streets like the U.S. Bank Stadium station shared with the Blue Line in Minneapolis. It is located on the block bounded by 5th Street, Minnesota Street, 4th Street, and Cedar Street.

Utility relocation construction work began along 4th Street in August 2009, well before the Green Line had received final funding or approval. Construction along Cedar Street, including demolition of the former Bremer Bank building on the block began in 2011. A skyway through the Bremer building was closed for much of the year but reopened on November 1, 2011. The station opened along with the rest of the line on June 14, 2014.
