= Hamline Avenue station =

Light rail station in Saint Paul, Minnesota

Hamline Avenue
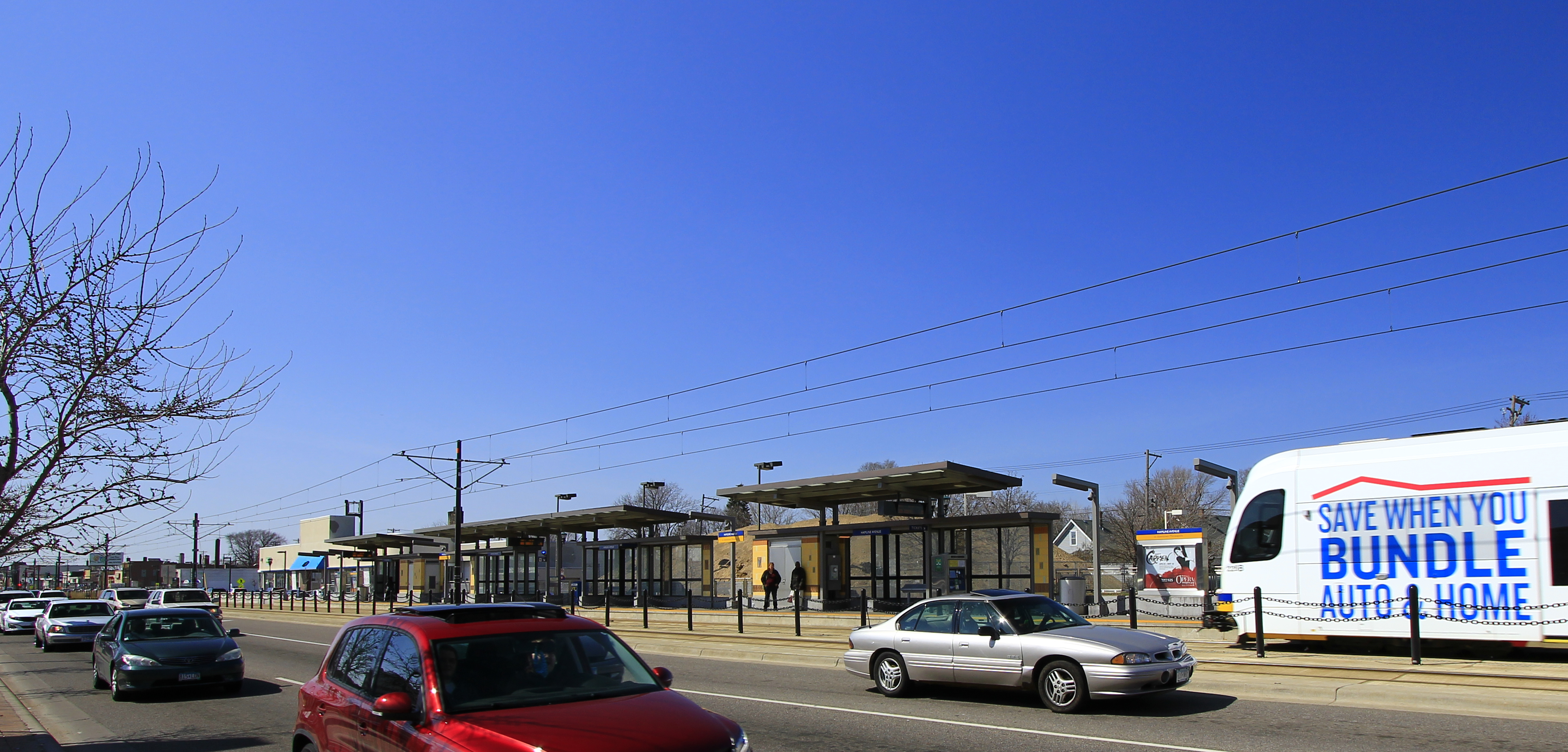
- Hamline Avenue station platform

General information
- Location: 1324 University Avenue West (Eastbound); 1359 University Avenue West (Westbound); Saint Paul, Minnesota
- Coordinates: 44°57′21″N 93°9′25″W
- Owner: Metro Transit
- Platforms: 2 split side platforms
- Tracks: 2
- Connections: Metro Transit: 72

Construction
- Structure type: At-grad2
- Accessible: Yes

History
- Opened: June 14, 2014

Passengers
- 2025: 867 daily ▼24.5%
- Rank: 20 out of 37

Services
| Preceding station | Metro | Following station |
|---|---|---|
| Snelling Avenue toward Target Field | Green Line | Lexington Parkway toward Saint Paul Union Depot |
Location

Hamline Avenue station /hæmˈlɪnˈ ˈæv əˌnju ˈsteɪ ʃən/ is a light rail station on the Metro Green Line in Saint Paul, Minnesota. It is located along University Avenue on both sides of the intersection with Hamline Avenue. The station has split side platforms, with the westbound platform on the north side of the tracks west of Hamline and the eastbound platform on the south side of the tracks east of the intersection.

Along with Victoria Street Station and Western Avenue Station, this station was originally planned to be an infill station that would be built after the main line had been constructed when there was sufficient demand. However, significant political pressure and changes in the Federal Transit Administration's rules led to an early 2010 announcement that it would be built with the rest of the line.

Construction in this area began in 2011. The station opened along with the rest of the line in 2014.
