= Lexington Parkway station =

Light rail station in Saint Paul, Minnesota

Lexington Parkway
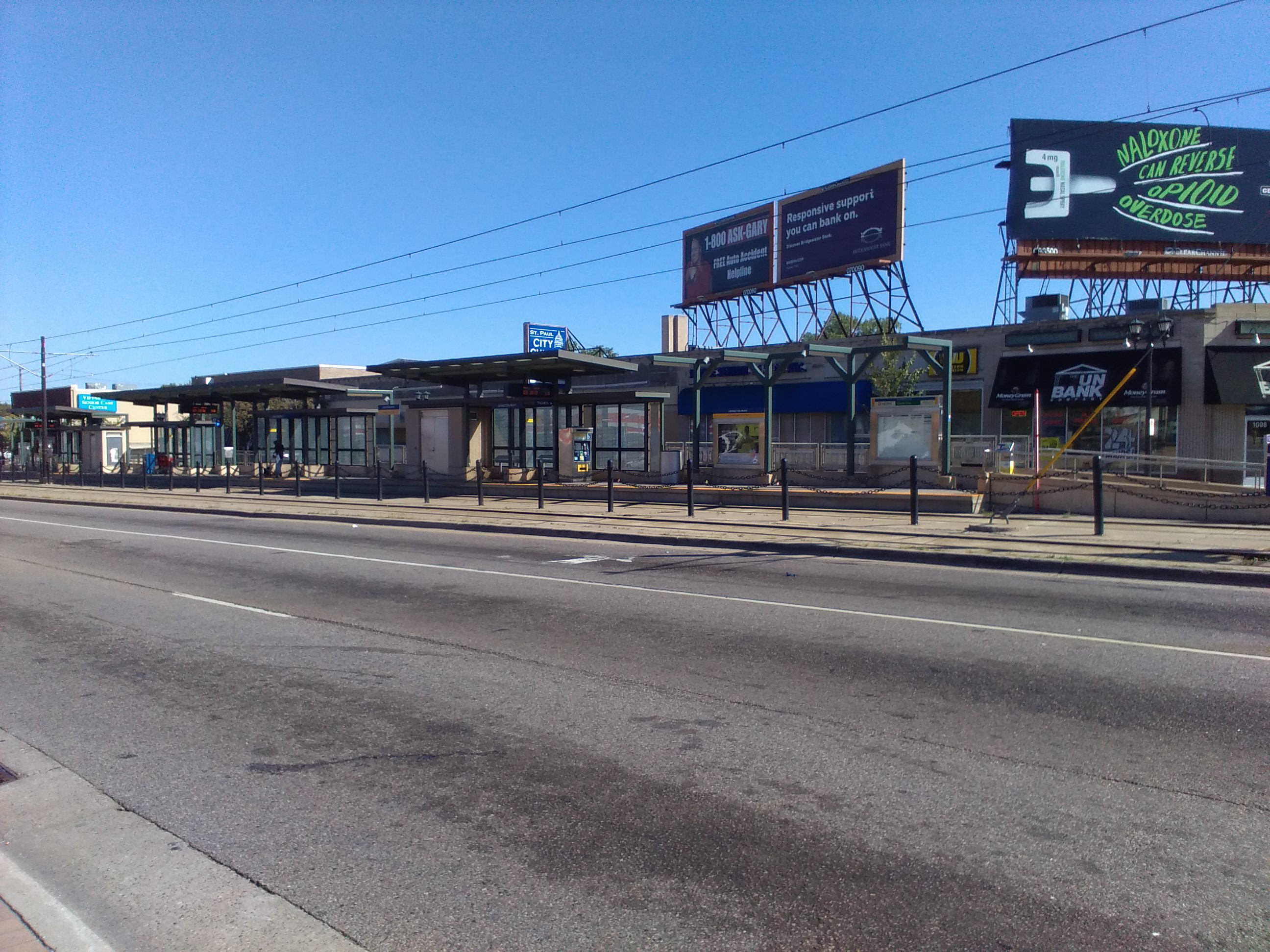
- Lexington Parkway station platform

General information
- Location: 1100 University Avenue West (Eastbound); 1117 University Avenue West (Westbound); Saint Paul, Minnesota
- Coordinates: 44°57′21″N 93°08′48″W
- Owner: Metro Transit
- Platforms: 2 split side platforms
- Tracks: 2
- Connections: Metro Transit: 83

Construction
- Structure type: At-grade
- Cycle facilities: Nice Ride station
- Accessible: Yes

History
- Opened: June 14, 2014

Passengers
- 2025: 830 daily ▼6.5%
- Rank: 21 out of 37

Services
Preceding station	Metro	Following station
Hamline Avenue toward Target Field	Green Line	Victoria Street toward Saint Paul Union Depot
Location

Lexington Parkway station is a light rail station along the Metro Green Line in Saint Paul, Minnesota. It is located along University Avenue on both sides of the intersection with Lexington Parkway. The station has split side platforms, with the westbound platform on the north side of the tracks west of Lexington and the eastbound platform on the south side of the tracks east of the intersection.

Construction in this area began in 2012. The station opened along with the rest of the line in 2014.
