= Katie McWatt =

African American civil rights leader

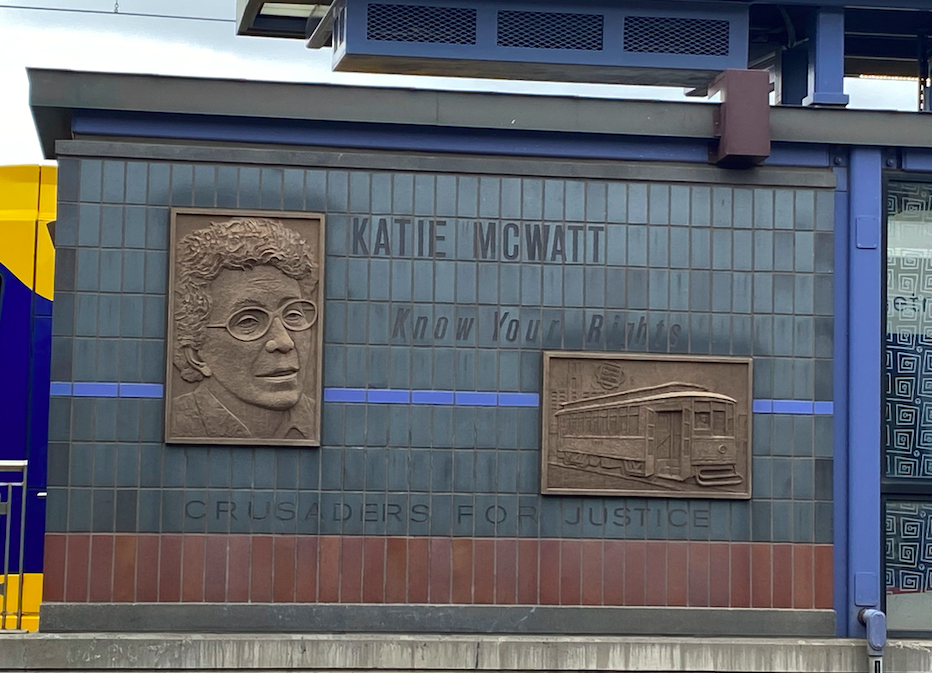
- Portrait of Katie McWatt in the "Faces of Rondo" art exhibit at the Victoria Street station
- Born: February 8, 1931
- Died: April 19, 2010 (aged 79)
- Education: University of Minnesota; University of North Dakota

Katie McWatt (February 8, 1931 - April 19, 2010) was a civil rights leader and activist who worked primarily in St. Paul, Minnesota. She was the first African American person to run for the St. Paul City Council.

== Early life and education ==
Kathleen Curry McWatt was born in Minneapolis, Minnesota, to James Howard Curry and Helen Curry (née Brady). Both of her parents were from Minnesota and her mother was part of the first graduating class of from the new Minneapolis Central High School in 1914. McWatt had one sister, Jean.

McWatt attended Minneapolis public schools for her primary and secondary education, and went on to the University of Minnesota for her undergraduate studies. She earned a bachelor's degree there in Speech and went on to study counseling and guidance at the University of North Dakota.

== Career and activism ==
McWatt began her career in education, first working as a student advisor for the Minnesota Employment Service Youth Opportunity Center. She then worked as a coordinator of Central High School’s Minority Education Program in St. Paul for 17 years until her retirement in 2000. She was also involved in various civic and community organizations, including serving as president of the St. Paul NAACP; director of the St. Paul Urban League; as first chair of the St. Paul Housing Committee; and on the boards of the League of Women Voters Minnesota, the Catholic Interracial Council, the Catholic Social Services, and the Hallie Q. Brown Community Center. She was also a member of the Council of Black Minnesotans.

Along with fellow St. Paul activist Josie Johnson, McWatt began lobbying against housing discrimination in the 1960s. While involved with the Urban League, McWatt helmed a protest and boycott of Minnesota-based General Mills in response to their hiring practices. As part of the action, she and other activists left truckloads of the company's products on the corporate grounds. She also advocated for the construction of the St. Phillip's Garden affordable housing community, and was later arrested while protesting the hiring practices of St. Paul's building trades; at one point she and other protesters jumped into a construction ditch to halt work. As a result, union leadership ultimately decided to open up positions to African American workers.

== City Council campaign and political career ==
In March 1964, McWatt was encouraged by local leaders — including the Reverend Denzil Carty, Kwame McDonald, and Alpha Adkins — to run for St. Paul City Council. She was endorsed by the Democratic-Farmer-Labor Party and supported by local organizations such as the North Central Voters League. McWatt won her primary, garnering 74 percent of the Summit University neighborhood, 84 percent of her precinct and 32 percent of St. Paul: this made her the first African American person in the history of the St. Paul City Council to win a primary race. She ultimately lost the contest by less than 2,000 votes in the citywide election, with 38,487 votes total. The campaign marked her as the first African American person to run for St. Paul City Council in its history.

In 1968, McWatt ran a campaign for a position in the Minnesota State House, which was ultimately unsuccessful. She later served as vice chairwoman of the Ramsey County Democratic-Farmer-Labor Party.

== Personal life ==
McWatt was married to Arthur "Chan" McWatt, an author and historian and history teacher in the St. Paul public school system. They were married for more than 55 years. The couple had four children and were long-term residents of the Summit-University neighborhood in St. Paul.

== Legacy ==
In April 2010, the St. Paul City Council named a portion of Dayton Avenue between Lexington Avenue and Dale Street "Katie McWatt Avenue" in honor of McWatt and her work. In 2021, she was featured in the Minnesota Historical Society's "Extraordinary Women" exhibit. She has also been included in the DFL Women's Hall of Fame and won an NAACP lifetime achievement award.

McWatt is also featured at the Victoria Street light rail station, in a permanent public art feature called "Faces of Rondo."
