= Victoria Street station (Metro Transit) =

Light rail station in Saint Paul, Minnesota

Victoria Street
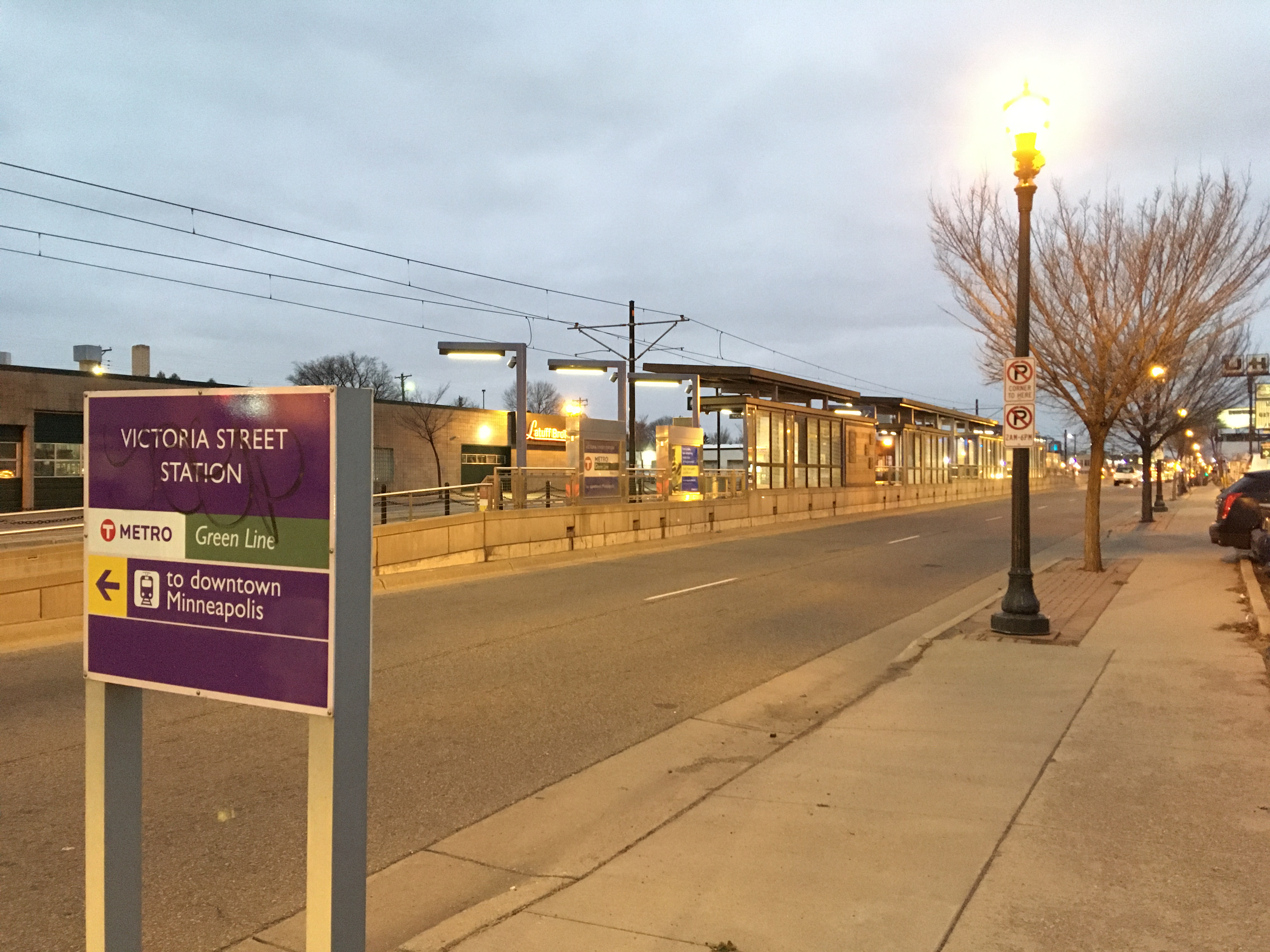
- Victoria Street station platform

General information
- Location: 844 University Avenue West (Eastbound); 875 University Avenue West (Westbound); Saint Paul, Minnesota
- Coordinates: 44°57′21″N 93°08′11″W
- Owner: Metro Transit
- Platforms: 2 split side platforms
- Tracks: 2

Construction
- Structure type: At-grade
- Accessible: Yes

History
- Opened: June 14, 2014

Passengers
- 2025: 521 daily ▼12%
- Rank: 30 out of 37

Services
Preceding station	Metro	Following station
Lexington Parkway toward Target Field	Green Line	Dale Street toward Saint Paul Union Depot
Location

Victoria Street station is a light rail stop on the Metro Green Line along University Avenue on both sides of the intersection with Victoria Street in Saint Paul, Minnesota. The station has split side platforms, with the westbound platform on the north side of the tracks west of Victoria and the eastbound platform on the south side of the tracks east of the intersection.

Along with Hamline Avenue Station and Western Avenue Station, this station was planned to be an infill station that would be built after the main line was constructed when there was sufficient demand. However, significant political pressure and changes in the Federal Transit Administration's rules led to an early 2010 announcement that it would be built with the rest of the line.

Construction in this area began in 2012. The station opened along with the rest of the line in 2014.

Model Cities, a social services and economic development non-profit, built its headquarters adjacent to the station. The building has office space for the non-profit, affordable apartments, and small business space.

Artwork at the station features terracotta tiles of local community members of the Rondo neighborhood. The art is called Faces of Rondo and was created by Foster Willey. People and organizations featured include Lou Bellamy, Sharon Sayles Belton, Hallie Quinn Brown, Gordon Parks, Katie McWatt, Mechanic Arts High School, and the Brotherhood of Sleeping Car Porters.
