= Capitol/Rice Street station =

Light rail station in Saint Paul, Minnesota

Capitol/Rice Street
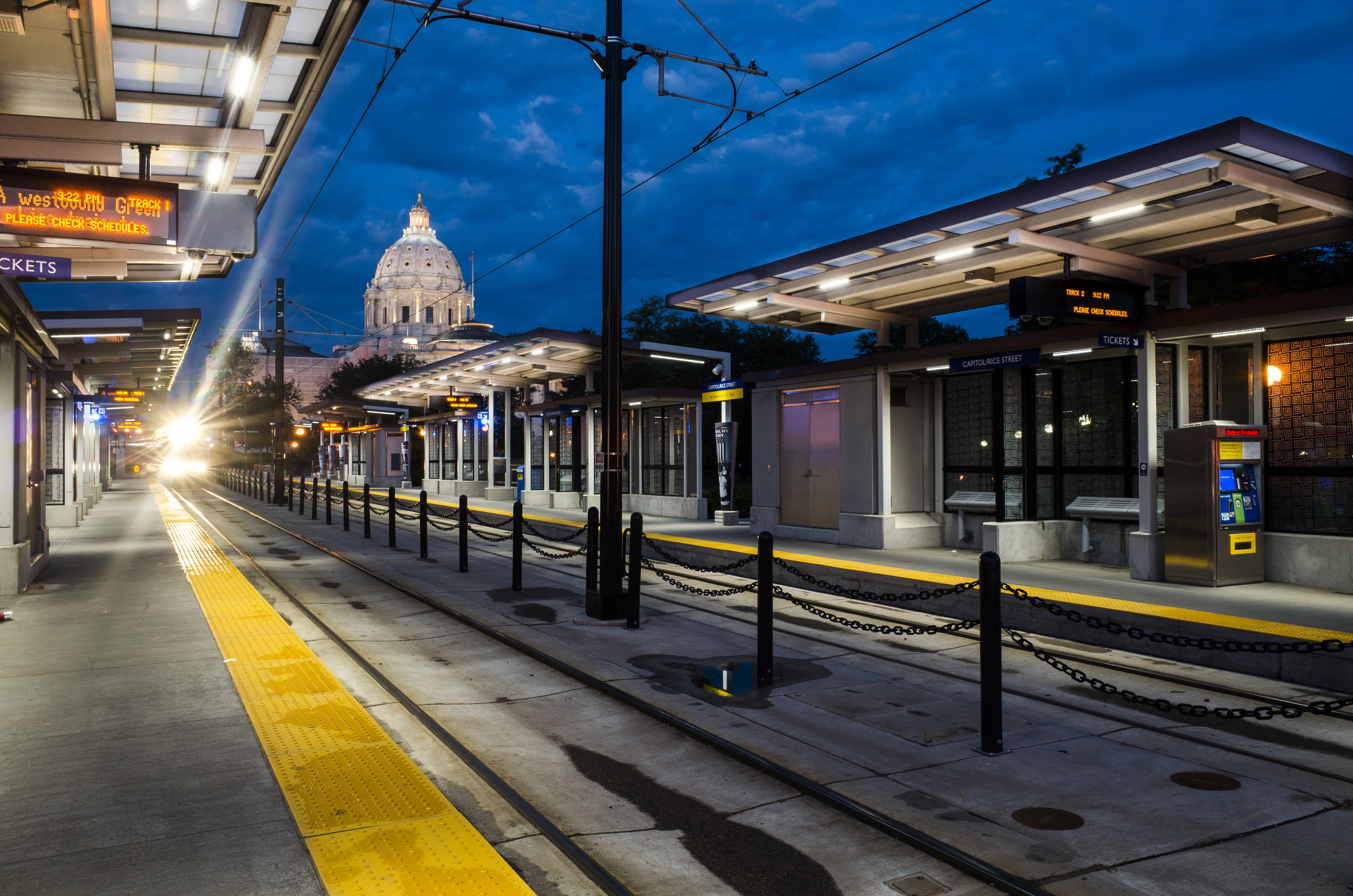
- Capitol/Rice Street station platforms with the Minnesota State Capitol in the background

General information
- Location: 130 University Avenue West; Saint Paul, Minnesota
- Coordinates: 44°57′21″N 93°6′17″W
- Owner: Metro Transit
- Platforms: 2 side platforms
- Tracks: 2
- Connections: Metro Transit: 3, 62, 67, 262

Construction
- Structure type: At-grade
- Accessible: Yes

Other information
- Fare zone: Downtown

History
- Opened: June 14, 2014

Passengers
- 2025: 709 daily ▼23.5%
- Rank: 24 out of 37

Services
Preceding station	Metro	Following station
Western Avenue toward Target Field	Green Line	Robert Street toward Saint Paul Union Depot
Location

Capitol/Rice Street station is a light rail station along the Metro Green Line in Saint Paul, Minnesota. It is located along the south side of University Avenue between Rice Street and Park Street/Rev. Dr. Martin Luther King Jr. Boulevard. This is on the north side of Leif Erikson Park, west of the Minnesota State Capitol.

Construction in this area began in 2012. The station opened along with the rest of the line in 2014.
