= Saint Paul, Minneapolis, & Manitoba Railway Company Shops Historic District =

Historic district in Minnesota, United States

- St. Paul, Minneapolis, & Manitoba Railway Company Shops Historic District
- U.S. National Register of Historic Places
- U.S. Historic district
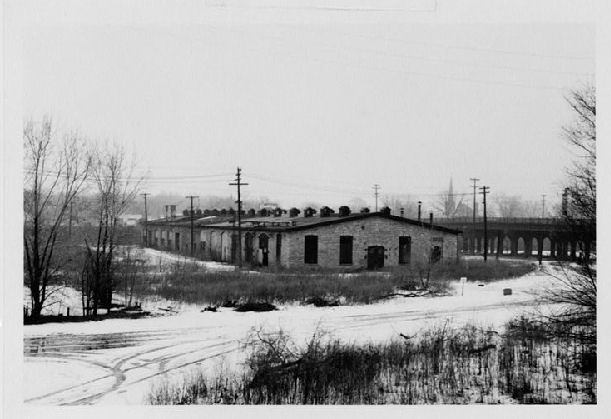

- Location within Minnesota Location within the United States
- Location: Jackson Street and Pennsylvania Avenue; Saint Paul, Minnesota
- Coordinates: 44°57′46″N 93°6′0″W
- Built: 1882
- NRHP reference No.: 86003564 (original); 100001228 (increase)

Significant dates
- Added to NRHP: December 21, 1987
- Boundary increase: June 19, 2017

St. Paul, Minneapolis, & Manitoba Railway Company Shops Historic District is a group of 1882 limestone maintenance buildings in Saint Paul, Minnesota. They served the Saint Paul, Minneapolis and Manitoba Railway, which later became part of the Great Northern Railway.

The buildings, located just west of the Minnesota Transportation Museum roundhouse, have been redeveloped by the Saint Paul Port Authority and are now known as the Empire Builder Business Center. Roseville Township in Kandiyohi County was once Incorporated by The Minneapolis- St Paul Manitoba Railway the train station was located in Hawick. Railway bonds and Abstract information can still be found with early settlers ancestors
