= Finance & Commerce =

Newspaper published in Minneapolis

Coordinates: 44.973896°N 93.269882°W

- Type: Daily newspaper
- Format: Broadsheet
- Owner: BridgeTower Media
- Publisher: Amy Sutton
- Editor: David Bohlander
- Founded: 1887
- Language: American English
- Headquarters: Minnesota, United States
- City: Minneapolis
- Country: United States
- Circulation: 1,336 (as of 2024)
- Sister newspapers: Minnesota Lawyer
- OCLC number: 1757619
- Website: finance-commerce.com

The Finance & Commerce is a daily newspaper devoted to business and construction news, primarily in the Twin Cities (Minneapolis–Saint Paul) and Rochester, Minnesota.

== Overview ==
Founded in 1887, it provides coverage of Twin Cities business news in the areas of real estate, construction, transportation, technology, banking, sustainable energy, health care, and advertising.

The newspaper is owned by BridgeTower Media. Finance and Commerce is the official legal notice paper for The City of Minneapolis and Hennepin County, Minnesota. Its offices located are in downtown Minneapolis at 520 Nicollet Mall, and it has many union employees.

== See also ==
- Commercial & Financial Chronicle
