= Metro Green Line (Minnesota) =

Light rail transit line in Minnesota, US

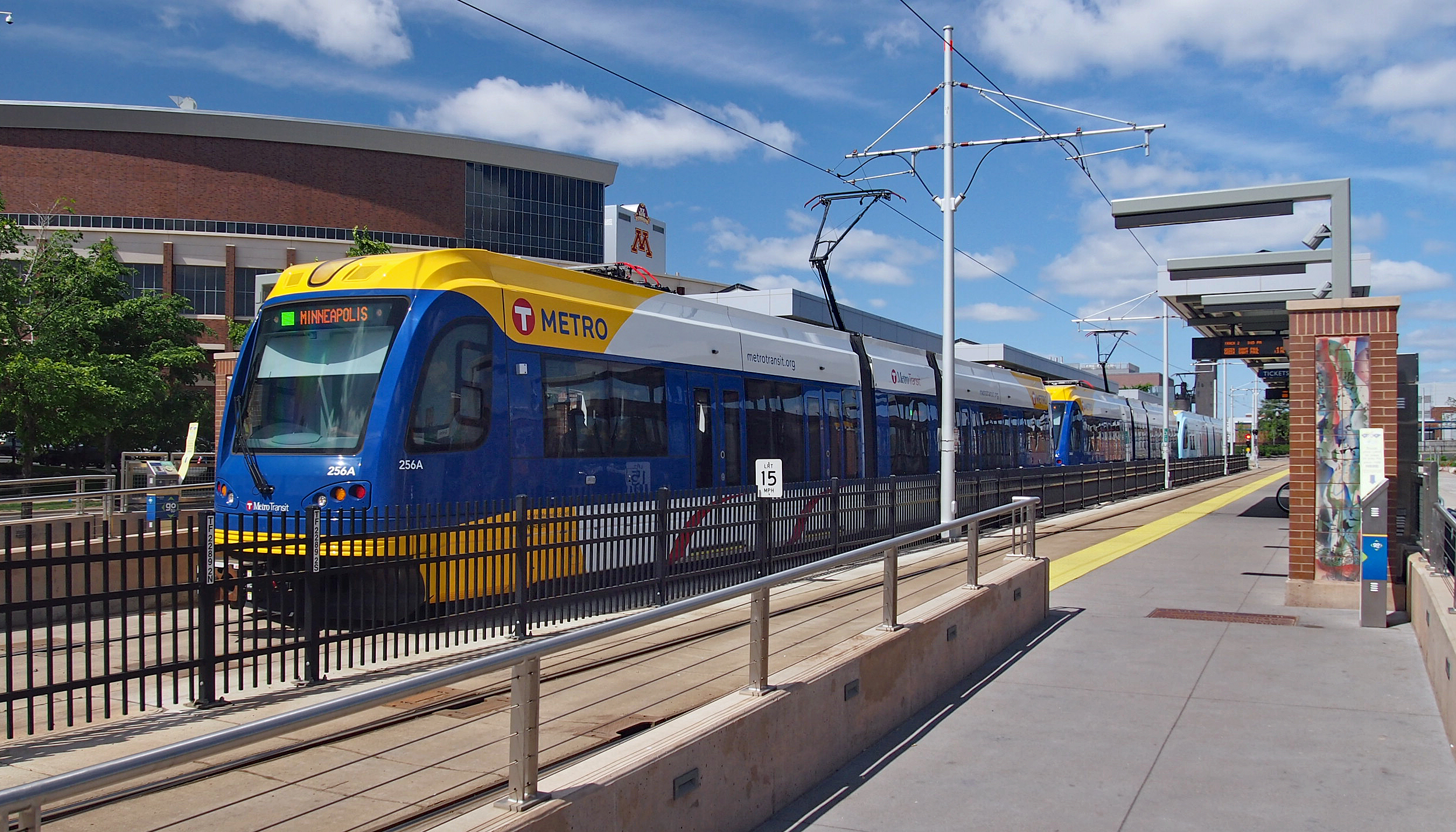
- A westbound train at Stadium Village station in 2015

Overview
- Status: Operational (Phase One) and under construction (Phase Two)
- Locale: Minneapolis–Saint Paul, Minnesota, U.S.
- Termini: Target Field (West); Saint Paul Union Depot (East)
- Stations: 23 (18 stations on the corridor to St. Paul & 5 shared with the Blue Line) (16 more planned on the Green Line Extension)

Service
- Type: Light rail
- System: Metro Light Rail
- Route number: 902 (whole line); 992 (night bus and replacement bus)
- Operator: Metro Transit
- Rolling stock: Siemens S70 and S700
- Daily ridership: 22,365 (avg. weekday, 2025)

History
- Opened: June 14, 2014

Technical
- Line length: 11 mi (18 km) (operational); 26.8 mi (43.1 km) (planned)
- Character: At-grade
- Track gauge: 4 ft 8 1/2 in (1,435 mm) standard gauge
- Electrification: Overhead line, 750 V DC
- Operating speed: 50 mph (80 km/h) max 14.5 mph (23.3 km/h) average

The Metro Green Line (formerly called the Central Corridor) is an 11-mile (18 km) light rail line that connects the central business districts of Minneapolis and Saint Paul in the U.S. state of Minnesota as well as the University of Minnesota. An extension is under construction that will extend the line to the southwest connecting St. Louis Park, Hopkins, Minnetonka and Eden Prairie. The line follows the path of former Metro Transit bus route 16 along University Avenue and Washington Avenue (which runs from downtown Minneapolis through the University of Minnesota main campus). It is the second light-rail line in the region, after the Blue Line, which opened in 2004 and connects Minneapolis with the southern suburb of Bloomington.

Construction on the Green Line began in late 2010. It opened to the public on June 14, 2014. The travel time between the downtown Minneapolis and downtown St. Paul stops is about 46 minutes. The entire line originally operated 24 hours a day, seven days a week, but as of 2019 trains are replaced by buses from 2 am to 4 am on weekdays. In 2018, the line carried a total of 13.8 million passengers.

== History ==
=== Former streetcar and bus lines ===
The route is a descendant of the Twin City Rapid Transit Company's St. Paul–Minneapolis streetcar line, also referred to as the Interurban line. Streetcars became practical along the route with the advent of electrification, and full service began along the route on December 9, 1890. In the 1950s, a decision was made to convert the streetcar system to buses. Streetcar service along the Interurban line ended in Saint Paul on October 31, 1953, and the route was the last to carry passengers in the city. Service continued a short while longer in Minneapolis, until November 28. However, due to fragmentary service elsewhere in Minneapolis, streetcars continued to use the tracks along University Avenue to reach the shops at Snelling Avenue in Saint Paul until June 1954.

The route 16 bus was developed to replace the streetcar, and followed the route of the modern-day Green Line. Other parallel service included freeway express service on route 94 and limited-stop service to the University of Minnesota on route 50. Twin City Lines continued to privately operate buses until 1970, when the company was taken over by the Metropolitan Transit Commission, a precursor to Metro Transit.

=== Proposals ===
In 1972, the Regional Fixed Guideway Study for the Metropolitan Transit Commission (the forerunner of today's Metro Transit) proposed a $1.3 billion 37- or 57-mile (sources differ) heavy-rail rapid transit system, but the then-separate Metropolitan Council disagreed with that idea – refusing to even look at the plan – and continuing political battles meant that it was never implemented. The Met Council had its own plans for bus rapid transit in the metropolitan region. Another system using smaller people movers was proposed in the 1975 Small Vehicle Fixed Guideway Study and gained the most traction with the Saint Paul city council, but was eventually dropped in 1980.

In the 1980s, light rail was proposed as an alternative and several possible corridors were identified, including the Central Corridor line which had a Draft Environmental Impact Statement (DEIS) drawn up in 1982. It took another two decades before the Blue Line light rail line began operation. It began service on June 26, 2004, just over 50 years since the last regular-service streetcar ran on June 19, 1954.

=== Central Corridor Coordinating Committee ===
The Central Corridor Coordinating Committee was a workgroup in the Minneapolis-St. Paul area set up to explore transit options for the Central Corridor, the interurban corridor roughly following University Avenue in the Twin Cities area. After a long period of examination, this committee narrowed transit options for the corridor from a broad universe of choices to just three: a no-build option where services are only incrementally improved, a bus rapid transit (BRT) option, wherein buses run on semi-dedicated transitway, and a light rail transit (LRT) option using light rail vehicles (LRVs). In May 2006 the CCCC concluded its study by publishing a Draft Environmental Impact Study, which concluded that LRT was the best option for the corridor. After a period of public meetings and public comment, the CCCC recommended on June 6, 2006, that the Metropolitan Council select LRT as the locally preferred alternative for the corridor and apply for preliminary engineering to begin. On June 28, 2006, the Metropolitan Council concurred with the CCCC's decision and officially selected LRT as the locally preferred alternative.

Metropolitan Council manages all transit, waterway, and other public resources for the seven-county area surrounding the Twin Cities, and as such, the Central Corridor project will now transition to Metropolitan Council. The work of the Central Corridor Coordinating Committee is now complete.

=== Funding ===
A 2003 study commissioned by the Central Corridor Coordinating Committee placed the cost at US$840 million. Cost estimates placed the cost of the light rail line in 2003, at about US$957 million, with the increase primarily due to inflation over the following decade. On June 6, 2006, the light rail option was endorsed by the Central Corridor Coordinating Committee. The Metropolitan Council gave final approval to this decision on June 28, 2006.

The existing Blue Line has exceeded ridership predictions, as is the case with many other light rail lines constructed in the U.S. during the last decade. This led to some delays for the Central Corridor project because local transit officials were forced to retool ridership models before submitting projections to the Federal Transit Administration (FTA). The Metropolitan Council, which operates Metro Transit, submitted numbers showing that a light rail line would carry 43,000 passengers daily by the year 2030. The FTA agreed that the line would be cost-effective at this level, a key requirement for obtaining federal funding.

In April 2008, Governor Tim Pawlenty initially vetoed $70 million in funding for the Central Corridor project, along with other items, from the state budget. The funding was part of a state-local package of $227 million necessary to get federal transportation funds, and the future of the project was in doubt until May 18, 2008, when a revised bonding bill including the $70 million for the Central Corridor was passed in the Legislature and signed into law by the governor. In August 2009 the Central Corridor project received a Record of Decision from the Federal Transit Administration. The FTA found the project to have fully and accurately completed its environmental documentation with the publication of the Final Environmental Impact statement earlier in the summer, thus clearing the project for final design.

=== Construction ===
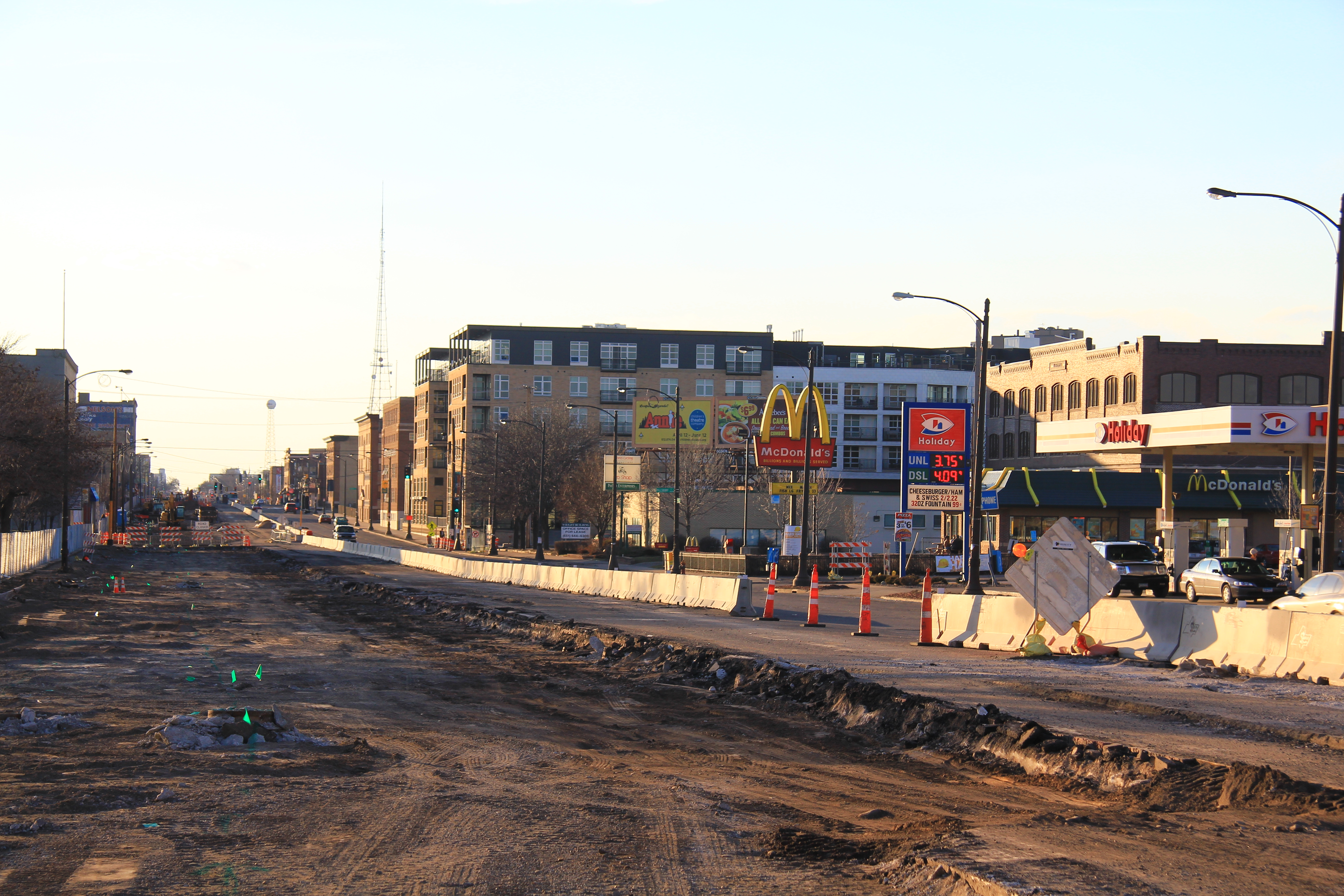
Green Line under construction

The first construction began in late 2010, including work in downtown St. Paul and near the University of Minnesota campus. By November 2011, construction was about 32% complete, including most heavy construction such as the installation of track segments, a new bridge, partial completion of stations, a rebuilt skyway in St. Paul and the construction of Green Line facilities at St. Paul Union Station.

Due to the scope of the project, a venture was created by C.S. McCrossan and Ames to complete an area known as The Civil West Project. This area extended from the west side of the 35W abutment, over the Mississippi River, through the UofM campus and ending at Bedford St. From Bedford to Saint Paul, Walsh Construction served as the general contractor.

In July 2011, the Metropolitan Council officially named the Central Corridor as the Green Line. As of August 2013, construction was completed and test trains began running over the line which opened to the public on June 14, 2014.

=== Additional stations ===
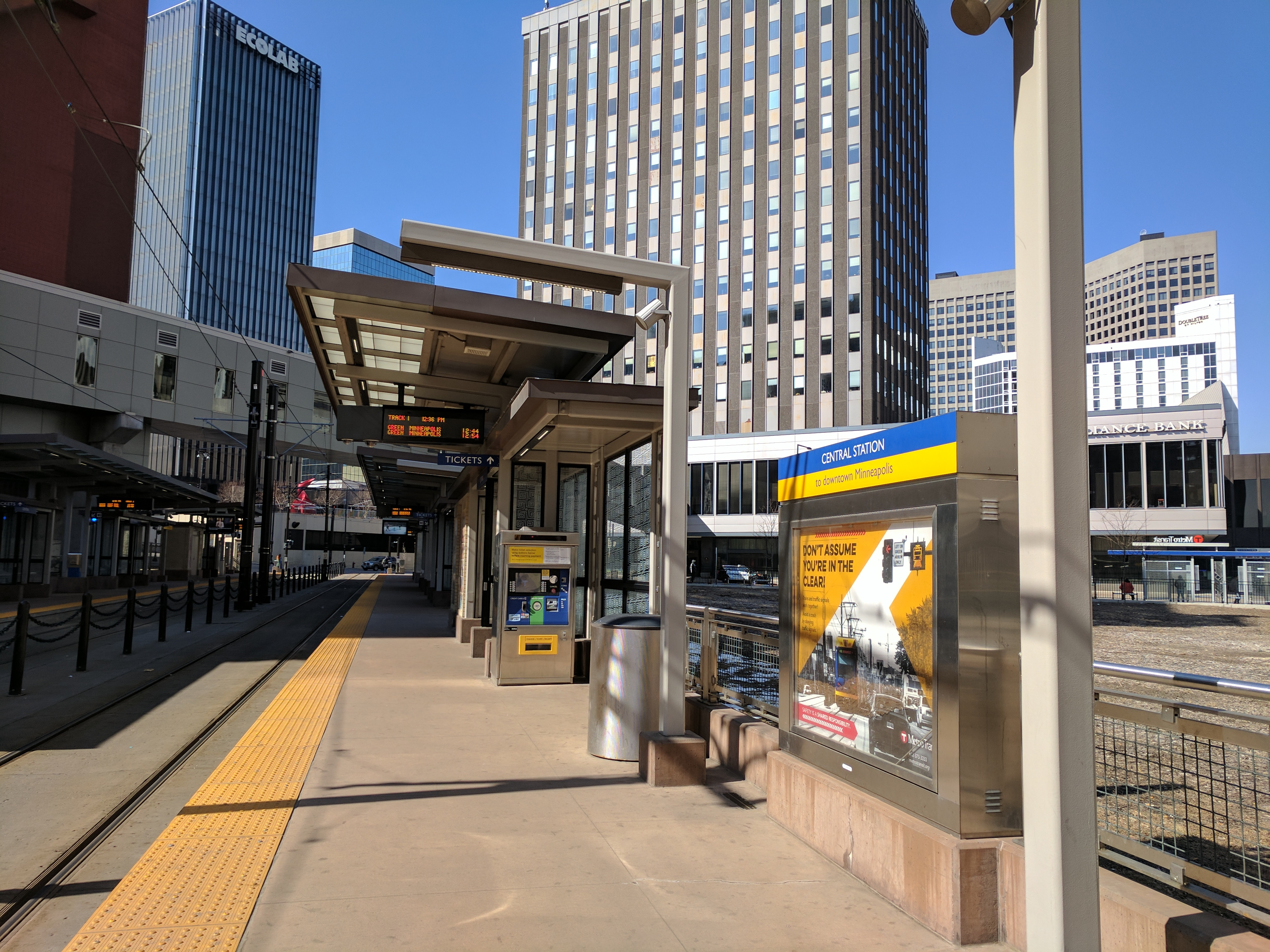
Central Station of the Green Line in downtown Saint Paul

Some in favor of the line have expressed concern with the number of stations. The neighborhoods along University have demanded that the line have stations every half-mile, from Snelling to Rice Street, which would mean stations at Hamline Avenue, Victoria Street and Western Avenue. In February 2008, the Central Corridor Management Committee passed a resolution to include below-ground infrastructure for the Hamline, Victoria and Western stations "with the understanding that, if the CEI increases or other dollars are made available by mid-summer 2008, the first claim on those dollars would be one of the infill stations." The Metropolitan Council has included this infrastructure work in their Draft Environmental Impact Statement and has also committed to building one station if any funds become available.

As of 2009, the Federal Transit Administration has increased the Cost Effectiveness Index such that buildout of one station is now feasible. On January 25, 2010, the FTA announced that the three "infill" stations will be built. Upon opening, all five stations between Snelling and Rice Street were built - Hamline Ave, Lexington Pkwy, Victoria St, Dale St, and Western Ave.

== Route ==
Metro Green Line interactive map

=== Stations ===
Station	Line	Transfer	Opened	Daily Ridership (2025)
Union Depot	Alt text	Alt text	2014	1,047
Central	Alt text		2014	1,277
10th Street	Alt text		2014	629
Robert Street	Alt text		2014	384
Capitol/Rice Street	Alt text		2014	709
Western Avenue	Alt text		2014	544
Dale Street	Alt text		2014	964
Victoria Street	Alt text		2014	521
Lexington Parkway	Alt text		2014	830
Hamline Avenue	Alt text		2014	867
Snelling Avenue	Alt text	Alt text	2014	1,342
Fairview Avenue	Alt text		2014	709
Raymond Avenue	Alt text		2014	829
Westgate	Alt text	Alt text	2014	656
Prospect Park	Alt text		2014	1,186
Stadium Village	Alt text	Alt text	2014	1,495
East Bank	Alt text		2014	3,366
West Bank	Alt text		2014	1,468
U.S. Bank Stadium	Alt text		2004	2,513
Government Plaza	Alt text		2004	1,333
Nicollet Mall	Alt text		2004	2,500
Warehouse District/Hennepin Avenue	Alt text	Alt text	2004	1,312
Target Field	Alt text		2009	1,725

== Opposition ==
Many businesses along the line were opposed to its development because of reduced access for automobiles. Under the final plans, 87% of on-street parking disappeared along University Avenue between Raymond Avenue and Rice Street. At least one restaurant has cited light rail construction as a reason for closing.

The corridor contains working-class residents and immigrant populations from Laos and Vietnam. Although the Green Line construction is mostly on an existing roadway and no land will be condemned, the disruption to existing transit and pedestrian ways was a concern to some groups. There is also concern that stops for light rail will be placed too far apart and along with reductions in bus service, transportation options for people will be reduced. Others are concerned about gentrification, where rising property values and taxes could force out lower-income residents.

Others have opposed using Washington Avenue for a pedestrian transit mall and have opposed using the Washington Avenue bridge, citing traffic concerns, along with the age of the bridge, when other bridges upriver could be used to cross the Mississippi River: the 10th Avenue Bridge, the new I-35W bridge or the Northern Pacific Bridge Number 9. This last option was preferred by the University of Minnesota, which feared traffic disruption and vibration at some of their research facilities from use of the Washington Avenue route. In late summer 2008, preliminary engineering reports showed that mitigation work could negate the effects of vibrations on university laboratory equipment. The University of Minnesota renewed its objections over vibration concerns along Washington Avenue in late 2009. Negotiations between the Metropolitan Council and the university continued into early 2010. A compromise was reached between the university and the Metropolitan Council and the Washington Avenue bridge was selected for use. As of Summer 2011, work had begun on the Washington Avenue bridge.

In January 2009, Minnesota Public Radio (MPR) raised concerns over the effects of the light-rail trains on their recording studios on Cedar Street in downtown St. Paul. MPR presented the results of an engineering study which they sponsored that conflicted with that performed by the Metropolitan Council. A settlement between MPR and other involved parties will keep the light rail trains on Cedar Street and will also compensate MPR for the addition of sound-proof upgrades to their studios.

== Extension ==
Construction is in progress for an extension to the Green Line. The line is to be extended to Southwest Station in Eden Prairie along the Metro Green Line Extension. The extension will add 16 additional stations and 14.5 miles (23.3 km) of trackage to the line, extending through St. Louis Park, Hopkins and Minnetonka. The estimated one-way travel time from Southwest Station in Eden Prairie to Target Field Station in Minneapolis is 32 minutes. Delays including neighborhood opposition from the Kenwood neighborhood and additional studies on the environmental effects of the Southwest Corridor have pushed back the planned opening to 2027.

== Transit links ==
The two light rail lines share trackage through downtown Minneapolis. At their north/western terminus, Target Field, they connected to the now-defunct Northstar Line commuter rail line until its closure in January 2026.

The eastern terminus of the Green Line is a street level station in front of the Saint Paul Union Depot, considered one of the great architectural achievements in the city and formerly one of the main points of departure for area train riders up until passenger rail service in the United States was restructured in the 1960s and 1970s. The concourse of the Union Depot is planned to become a transfer point for people coming into St. Paul along the proposed Rush Line and Gold Line bus rapid transit lines. As of June 2014, Union Depot is a transit center for Metro Transit, MVTA, Jefferson Lines, Megabus, Greyhound buses, and Amtrak's Empire Builder and Borealis trains.

== Bus service ==
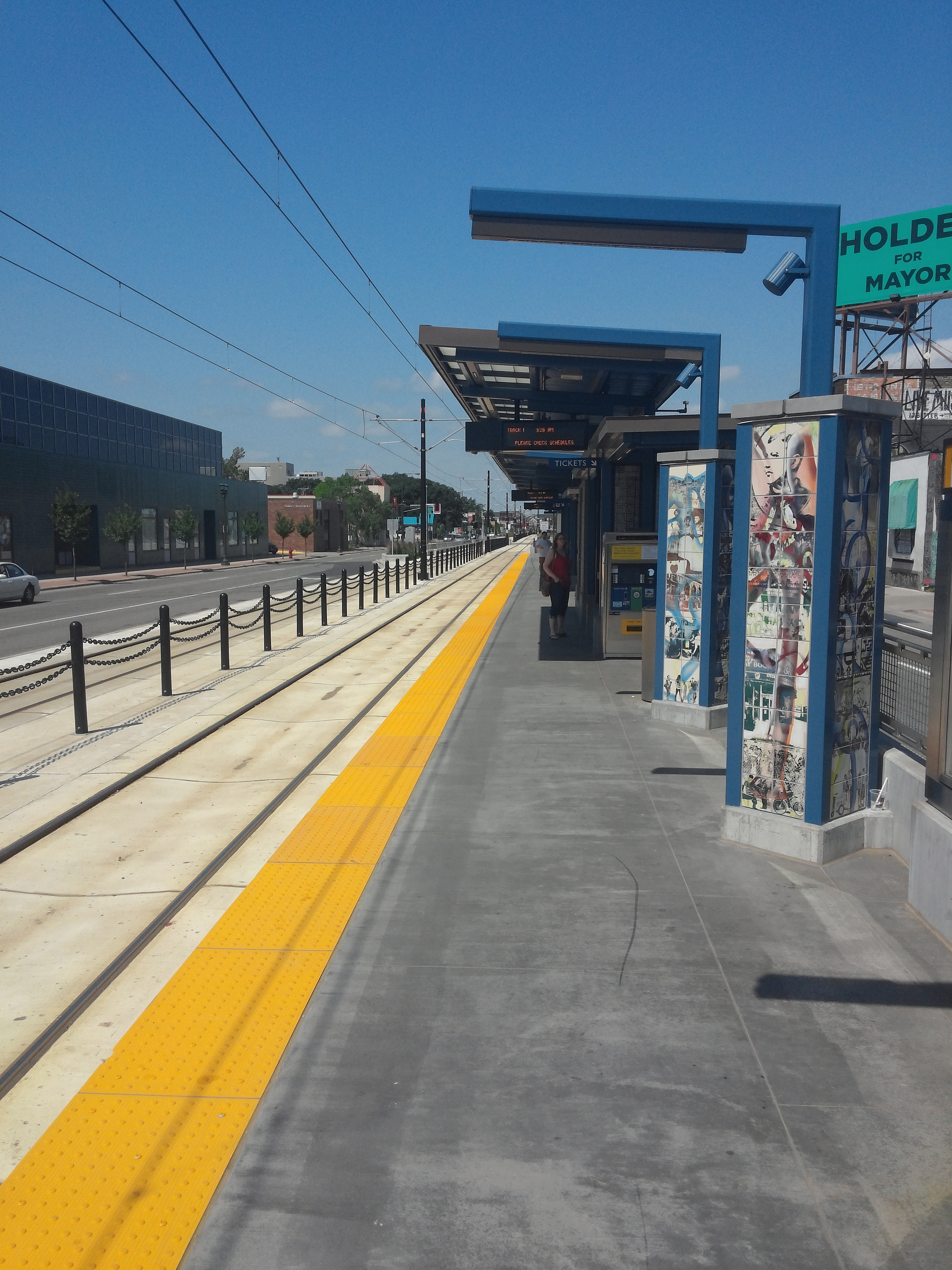
Snelling Avenue Green Line station

Metro Transit Route 16 parallels the Green Line between St. Paul and Fairview Ave Station. Route 50 formerly operated alongside Route 16 during weekdays, but with stops generally spaced about one-half mile apart. It was discontinued when the Green Line entered service. After the Green Line opened, Route 16 service was cut back from 1 AM to 5 AM, frequency was reduced to every 20 minutes and the route was truncated at the University of Minnesota. In 2010, route 16 had an operating budget of $10 million and generated $3.7 million in revenue (a farebox recovery ratio of 37%), while Route 50 had a 2010 budget of $3.5 million and generated $1.3 million in revenue (37% farebox recovery ratio). Route 16 carried about 5 million passengers, with weekday ridership averaging 16,880 and Saturday and Sunday ridership averaging 12,082 and 7,110, respectively. Route 50 carried about 1.5 million riders over the course of the year, with weekday ridership averaging 6,886.

Metro Transit also provides weekday express bus service along Interstate 94 between the St. Paul and Minneapolis downtown areas.

== Vehicles ==
Siemens Industry Incorporated built 47 S70 Light Rail Vehicles for the Green Line, at a per-LRV cost of $3,297,714 and a total contract value of $154,992,558. The LRVs were built in Florin, California, and the first vehicle was delivered on October 10, 2012.

== Safety ==
During testing of the Green line before it opened, there were four collisions recorded. One was at Portland Avenue and 5th Street in Downtown Minneapolis. This intersection was already in use by Blue Line and is now being shared by the Blue and Green Lines.

The first death occurred in August 2014, when Shana Buchanan, former attorney, was struck by a train as she attempted to cross the tracks at Westgate Station.

On April 30, 2015, Lynne Thomas, the Minnesota Senate's office of counsel and research receptionist, was the second pedestrian killed by a Green Line train.

On December 10, 2015, pedestrian Nurto Abdi Aden was struck and killed as she crossed the Green Line tracks near Hamline Avenue Station.

On July 15, 2017, Nicholas Westlake, 29, died after a train struck his car near University and Highway 280. Westlake's girlfriend and ballroom dance partner Neli Petkova was in the passenger seat at the time of the collision and was subsequently treated for injuries and released from the hospital. In response to the Westlake crash, in which the train operator illegally ran a red light, Minnesota legislators changed a law that had previously prevented light-rail train operators from being charged in fatal collisions.

On January 28, 2018, a female pedestrian was struck and killed, near the intersection of University Avenue and Pascal Street in St. Paul.

A sixth fatality, a male runner, was struck and killed on October 8, 2018, around 4:30 p.m., near Hamline Avenue; he died at the hospital.

A seventh person, a male pedestrian at the Stadium Village station near the University of Minnesota, was run over and killed by a departing train early on April 20, 2019, after he fell between two of its cars.

On August 30, 2019, the eighth fatality, a female pedestrian, was struck just after 3 p.m. at the Dale Street Station. She was walking north in a crosswalk on University Ave. when she was struck by a westbound train.

An eastbound train struck a car near the Rice Street station in the afternoon of July 4, 2021, marking the line's ninth fatality. Another occupant of the car was hospitalized in critical condition, and the train's operator was taken for medical evaluation.

Around 10:30 a.m. on June 8, 2022, a bicyclist was stuck and killed by a light rail train at the Raymond Avenue Station, the tenth fatality since the line opened.

The 11th fatality occurred on May 29, 2024, when a bicyclist was struck and killed by a Green Line train near the Minnesota State Capitol and the Rice Street station during the afternoon rush hour around 4:15PM.

The 12th death happened shortly after 3:30 p.m. on July 23, 2024, when a pedestrian was struck and killed near the intersection of University Avenue and Syndicate Street.

The 13th fatal incident occurred in the afternoon of March 5, 2025, at University Avenue West and North Avon Street. The victim was reportedly in a marked pedestrian crossing. The train's driver was also injured.

== Health impacts ==
The Minnesota Metro Green Line had a causal impact of improving people's access to health care by providing reliable public transportation. Researchers from the University of Minnesota, Harvard Medical School, and the Urban Institute conducted a Difference in differences study and found that the opening of the light rail line had a causal impact on reducing the rate of missed doctors appointments.
