= Louis Lockwood =

American architect

Louis F. Lockwood (1864 – 1907) was an architect in Saint Paul, Minnesota. He designed more homes on Summit Avenue than any other architectural firm. Several of his works are listed on the National Register of Historic Places.

== Biography ==
Lockwood was born in London in 1854 and attended King's College, graduating in 1994. He worked in a London architectural office before moving to Portland, Oregon in 1889. He moved to St. Paul in 1892. His firm designed more homes on Summit Avenue than any other architectural firm and nearly one-half of the homes in Merriam Park. He combined artistic sense and practicality.

He was a nephew of Henry Francis Lockwood (1811–1878), English architect.

He partnered briefly with architect Peter Linhoff.

He died in December 1907.

== Works ==
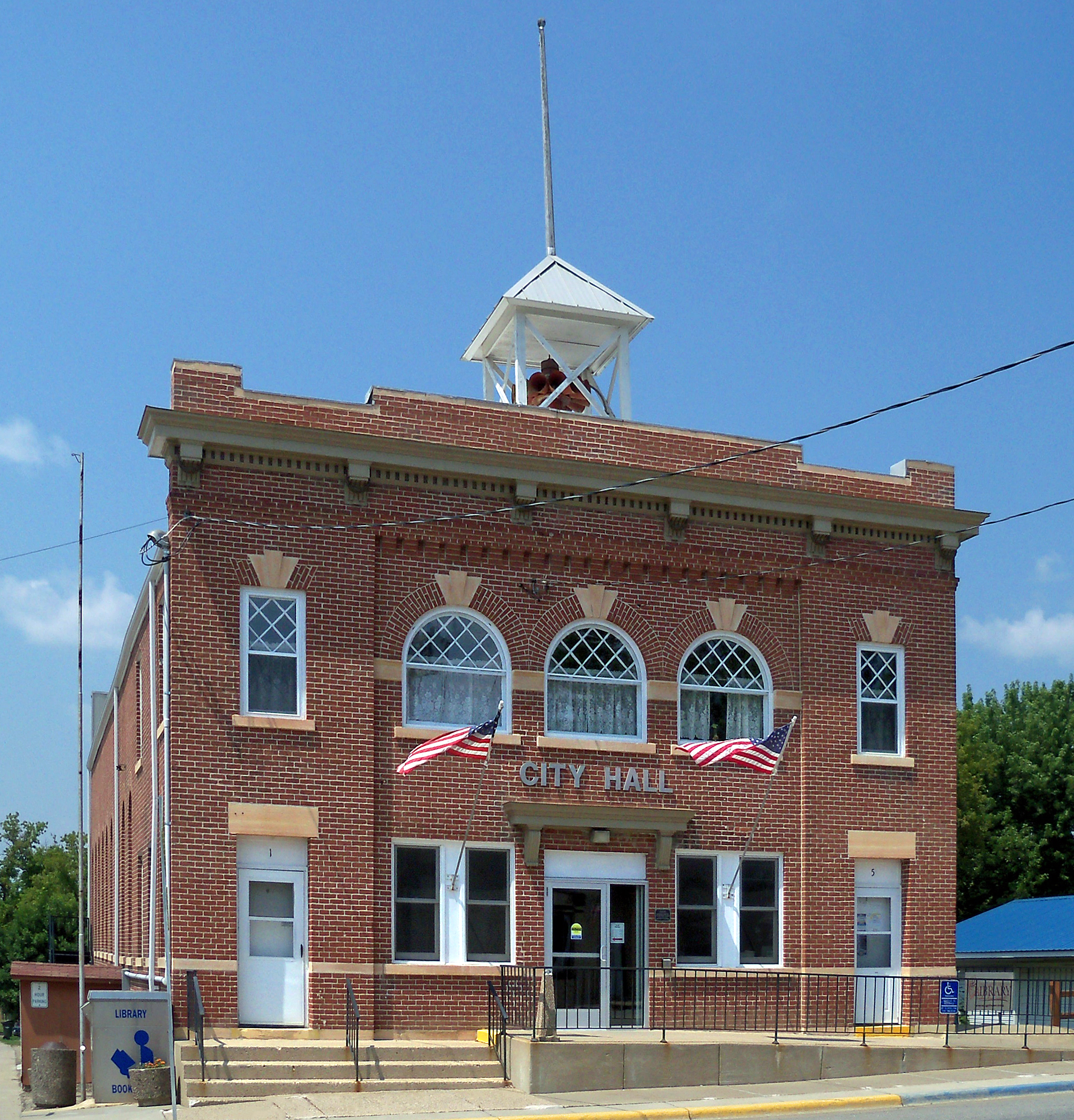
Kimball City Hall, designed by Lockwood and built in 1908.

- Vienna and Earl Apartment Buildings (1907), 682-688 Holly Ave., St. Paul, MN (Lockwood, Louis F.), NRHP-listed
- Kimball Prairie Village Hall (1908), Main St. and Hazel, Kimball, MN (Lockwood, Louis), NRHP-listed
- Robert C. Dunn House, 708 S. 4th St., Princeton, MN (Lockwood, Louis), NRHP-listed
- James D. and Susan Bronson House, 1309 3rd St S, Stillwater, MN
- At least seven houses that are contributing buildings in the NRHP-listed West Summit Avenue Historic District:
  - T.D. Laughlin House (1905), 1135 Summit Avenue, Classical Revival style house, and carriage house
  - Mrs. B. Knuppe House (1899), 1381 Summit Avenue, American Foursquare house
  - Clarence H. Slocum House (1899), 1382 Summit Avenue, Craftsman style house
  - William David Stewart House (1907), 1410 Summit Avenue, Tudor Revival
  - John A. Swenson House (1900), 1411 Summit Avenue, American Foursquare
  - Arthur W. Wallace House (1906), 1515 Summit Avenue, Classical Revival
  - Mrs. Francis J. Connell House (1906), 1726 Summit Avenue, Classical Revival
- At least five contributing buildings in NRHP-listed Historic Hill District:
  - C.A, Bettigen House (1900), 825 Goodrich Avenue, mix of Queen Anne and medieval revival modes
  - Dr. L.C. Bacon House (1898), 737 Fairmount Avenue, cubiform
  - Skea-Skaret House (1906), 808 Fairmount Avenue, Neo-classic/Georgian
  - J.R. Beggs House (1907), 922 Portland Avenue, square-plan, hipped roof (perhaps American Foursquare?)
  - F. Whitman House (1903), 947 Portland Avenue, "typical of the transitional phase between the Queen Anne and the Medieval Revivals"
