= List of National Historic Landmarks in Minnesota =

Minnesota National Historic Landmarks (clickable map)

This is a complete List of National Historic Landmarks in Minnesota. The United States National Historic Landmark program is operated under the auspices of the National Park Service, and recognizes structures, districts, objects, and similar resources according to a list of criteria of national significance. The state of Minnesota is home to 25 of these landmarks, illustrating the state's Native American, industrial, logging, mining, military, and political heritage, as well as its contributions to the broader themes of developing the frontier for the European pioneers.

The article also lists other historical landmarks of national importance that are administered by the National Park Service.

== Key ==
	National Historic Landmark
^{†}	National Historic Landmark District
^{#}	National Historic Site, National Historical Park, National Memorial, or National Monument
^{*}	Delisted Landmark

== List ==
The table below lists all 25 of these sites, along with added detail and description.

	Landmark name	Image	Date designated	Location	County	Description
1	Christ Church Lutheran	Christ Church Lutheran	January 16, 2009 (#01000654)	Minneapolis; 44°56′38″N 93°13′24″W	Hennepin	Modern-style church designed by father and son architects Eliel Saarinen and Eero Saarinen
2	F. Scott Fitzgerald House	F. Scott Fitzgerald House	November 11, 1971 (#71000440)	Saint Paul; 44°56′29″N 93°07′29″W	Ramsey	This was the home of Francis Scott Fitzgerald (1896–1940); as spokesman for the Jazz Age, he wrote several stories and his first published novel, This Side of Paradise in this Victorian rowhouse on Summit Avenue in Saint Paul. The novels The Beautiful and Damned and The Great Gatsby quickly followed.
3	Fort Snelling	Fort Snelling	February 19, 1960 (#66000401)	Minneapolis; 44°53′34″N 93°10′50″W	Hennepin	Originally known as Fort St. Anthony, this is a former military fortification located at the confluence of the Minnesota and Mississippi Rivers in Hennepin County, Minnesota. It is part of the Mississippi National River and Recreation Area.
4	Grand Mound	Grand Mound	June 23, 2011 (#11000565)	International Falls; 48°31′00″N 93°42′31″W	Koochiching	
5	James J. Hill House	James J. Hill House	November 5, 1961 (#66000405)	Saint Paul; 44°56′42″N 93°06′32″W	Ramsey	This house was built by railroad magnate James J. Hill. Completed in 1891, it is near the eastern end of Summit Avenue near the Cathedral of Saint Paul. With 36,000 square feet (3,344 square meters) of living area, the house is the largest residence in Minnesota.
6	Hull-Rust-Mahoning Open Pit Iron Mine	Hull-Rust-Mahoning Open Pit Iron Mine	November 13, 1966 (#66000904)	Hibbing; 47°27′N 92°57′W	St. Louis	This mine is the largest open pit iron mine in the world. Located in the Mesabi Range, it supplied as much as one-fourth of all the iron ore mined in the United States during its peak production years of World War I and World War II. This area of the Mesabi Range was explored in 1893–1894, shortly after the Mountain Iron mine was established in 1892. The early development was as an underground mine, but open cast mining soon proved to be a better choice because of the soft, shallow ore deposits. Many open pits in the area soon merged into one large mine, and the consolidation of mines led to the formation of U.S. Steel in 1901. The growth of the mine even resulted in the town of Hibbing being relocated to accommodate expansion.
7^{†}	Kathio Site	Kathio Site	July 19, 1964 (#66000403)	Vineland; 46°09′49″N 93°45′27″W	Mille Lacs	This area includes habitation sites and mound groups, believed to date between 3000 BC and 1750 AD, that document Sioux Indian culture and Ojibwe-Sioux relationships. Now a state park, it contains 19 identified archaeological sites, making it one of the most significant archaeological collections in Minnesota. The earliest site dates to the Archaic period and shows evidence of copper tool manufacture.
8^{†}	Oliver H. Kelley Homestead	Oliver H. Kelley Homestead	July 19, 1964 (#66000406)	Elk River; 45°18′49″N 93°34′53″W	Sherburne	This farmstead was once owned by Oliver Hudson Kelley, one of the founders of the Order of Patrons of Husbandry. Oliver Kelley moved to Minnesota in 1849, the year that Minnesota Territory was formed. Although he knew little about farming, he taught himself using agricultural journals and correspondence with other "scientific-oriented" farmers. He became an expert on farming in Minnesota, and he learned how adverse events such as bad weather, debt, insect pests, and crop failures could devastate a farmer's fortunes.
9	Frank B. Kellogg House	Frank B. Kellogg House	December 8, 1976 (#74001035)	Saint Paul; 44°56′14″N 93°07′36″W	Ramsey	From 1889 until his death, this was the residence of Frank B. Kellogg (1856–1937), lawyer, U.S. Senator, and diplomat. As Secretary of State (1925–29), he negotiated the Kellogg-Briand Pact (1928), for which he received the Nobel Peace Prize, and shifted foreign policy away from interventionism.
10	Sinclair Lewis Boyhood Home	Sinclair Lewis Boyhood Home	May 23, 1968 (#68000027)	Sauk Centre; 45°44′14″N 94°57′25″W	Stearns	From 1885 to 1902, this was the home of Sinclair Lewis (1885–1951) the first American author to be awarded the Nobel Prize for literature (1930). His novel Main Street (1920) was partly based on his impressions of Sauk Centre, Minnesota.
11	Charles A. Lindbergh Sr. House	Charles A. Lindbergh Sr. House	December 8, 1976 (#70000303)	Little Falls; 45°57′27″N 94°23′23″W	Morrison	This was once the farm of Congressman Charles August Lindbergh and his son Charles Lindbergh, the famous aviator, and is now a state park. Their restored 1906 house and two other farm buildings are within the park boundaries. Three buildings and three structures built by the Works Progress Administration in the 1930s were named to the National Register of Historic Places. These buildings include a picnic shelter and a water tower, built in the Rustic Style from local stone and logs, and have remained relatively unchanged since construction.
12	Mayo Clinic Buildings	Mayo Clinic Buildings	August 11, 1969 (#69000075)	Rochester; 44°01′18″N 92°27′56″W	Olmsted	This building is an architecturally significant part of the Mayo Clinic. It was originally called the 1929 building, but was renamed the Plummer Building after its chief architect and Mayo Clinic co-founder, Henry Stanley Plummer. It was the tallest building in Rochester, Minnesota from its construction in 1929 until 2001 when the nearby Gonda Building was completed.
13	Mountain Iron Mine	Mountain Iron Mine	November 24, 1968 (#68000052)	Mountain Iron; 47°32′N 92°37′W	St. Louis	Discovered in 1890, this mine's first shipment of iron ore occurred in 1892. Its production led to the realization that the Mesabi Range possessed the world's largest deposits of iron ore, making Minnesota the nation's premier supplier of the resource.
14	National Farmers Bank	National Farmers Bank	January 7, 1976 (#71000441)	Owatonna; 44°05′06″N 93°13′33″W	Steele	This bank building was designed by Louis Sullivan with decorative elements by George Elmslie. It was built in 1908, and was the first of Sullivan's "jewel boxes". The building is clad in red brick with green terra cotta bands, and features two large arches. Internal elements include a stained glass window designed by Louis J. Millet, a mural by Oskar Gross, and a cast iron electrolier by William Winslow.
15	Peavey-Haglin Experimental Concrete Grain Elevator	Peavey-Haglin Experimental Concrete Grain Elevator	December 2, 1981 (#78001547)	St. Louis Park; 44°56′33″N 93°20′43″W	Hennepin	This grain elevator, built in 1899-1900, was the first circular concrete grain elevator in the United States, and possibly in the world. It is notable for proving the viability of concrete in grain elevator construction. Previous grain elevators, being built of wood, were expensive to build and vulnerable to fire. It was located along the Minneapolis and St. Louis Railway.
16	Pillsbury "A" Mill	Pillsbury "A" Mill	November 13, 1966 (#66000402)	Minneapolis; 44°59′02″N 93°15′10″W	Hennepin	This mill, situated along Saint Anthony Falls on the Mississippi River in Minneapolis, Minnesota, held the title of largest flour mill in the world for 40 years. Completed in 1881, it was owned by Pillsbury and operated two of the most powerful direct-drive waterwheels ever built, each generating 1,200 horsepower (895 kW). The mill still stands today on the east side of the Mississippi River, but ceased operation in 2003.
17^{†}	Rabideau CCC Camp	Rabideau CCC Camp	February 17, 2006 (#76001046)	Chippewa National Forest; 47°38′24″N 94°32′55″W	Beltrami	This camp was built by the Civilian Conservation Corps in the Chippewa National Forest in northern Minnesota. The camp was established in 1935 as a project of Franklin D. Roosevelt's New Deal program. The camp, one of 2650 nationwide, was home to about 300 men aged 17–21. Like most CCC camps, the Rabideau camp was established to provide work to those unemployed as a result of the Great Depression. Enrollees at the camp came mostly from Northern Minnesota and worked on projects within the Chippewa National Forest, such as building roads and other facilities, surveying, wildlife protection, and other forestry activities.
18	O. E. Rolvaag House	O. E. Rolvaag House	August 4, 1969 (#69000078)	Northfield; 44°27′48″N 93°10′20″W	Rice	From 1912 until his death, this was the residence of Ole Edvart Rølvaag (1876–1931), a Norwegian immigrant and the first American novelist to give a true accounting of the psychological cost of pioneering on the frontier. His famous trilogy—Giants in the Earth (1927), Peder Victorious (1928), and Their Father's God (1931)—stands in our literature as the most mature and penetrating assessment of the adjustments immigrant pioneers had to make in order to find peace and prosperity in middle America.
19	St. Croix Boom Site	St. Croix Boom Site	November 13, 1966 (#66000407)	Stillwater; 45°04′41″N 92°47′53″W	Washington	This site is located on the St. Croix River upstream of Stillwater, Minnesota. It was established by Stillwater lumber barons, including Isaac Staples, in 1856 after the demise of the original St. Croix Boom Company, which had operated a boom further upstream near Marine on St. Croix, Minnesota. Staples and others purchased the Boom Company and moved the site downstream.
20	St. Croix Recreational Demonstration Area	St. Croix Recreational Demonstration Area	September 25, 1997 (#97001261)	Hinckley; 46°00′41″N 92°56′40″W	Pine	This area was used for logging between the mid-19th century and about 1915. After the logging era was over, farmers were attracted to the newly cleared land, but the soil was poor and not productive enough to make a living. In 1934, 18,000 acres (73 km^{2}) of farmland was purchased, and the following year, the St. Croix Recreational Demonstration Area was started. Under the direction of the National Park Service, the Works Progress Administration and the Civilian Conservation Corps built group camps, roads, and campgrounds.
21	Soudan Iron Mine	Soudan Iron Mine	November 13, 1966 (#66000905)	Tower; 47°51′28″N 92°17′59″W	St. Louis	This is Minnesota's oldest, deepest, and richest iron mine, and now hosts the Soudan Underground Laboratory. In the late 19th century, prospectors searching for gold in northern Minnesota discovered extremely rich veins of hematite at this site, often containing more than 65% iron. An open pit mine began operation in 1882, and moved to underground mining by 1900 for reasons of safety. From 1901 until the end of active mining in 1962, the Soudan Mine was owned by the United States Steel Corporation's Oliver Iron Mining division. By 1912 the mine was at a depth of 1,250 feet (381 m). When it closed, level 27 was being developed at 2,341 feet (713.5 m) below the surface. US Steel then donated the Soudan Mine to the State of Minnesota to use for educational purposes.
22	Split Rock Light Station	Split Rock Light Station	June 23, 2011 (#69000073)	Beaver Bay; 47°12′00″N 91°22′01″W	Lake	Split Rock Light Station possesses national significance as an extremely rare example of Great Lakes light stations designed as a single, cohesive and self-sufficient complex. Built between 1909-1910, the station served as a crucial aid to navigation for commercial freighters until 1969, at a time when the Great Lakes emerged as a vital component of the nation's industrial economy. Split Rock is a Minnesota state historic site and is open to the public, and operates a website for the public.
23	Thorstein Veblen Farmstead	Thorstein Veblen Farmstead	December 2, 1981 (#75001024)	Nerstrand; 44°21′N 93°03′W	Rice	This site consists of the home and farm buildings where Thorstein B. Veblen (1857–1929) grew up. As an economist, social scientist, and critic of American culture, he was the product of an austere agrarian upbringing; Veblen has often been called one of America's most creative and original thinkers.
24	Andrew John Volstead House	Andrew John Volstead House	December 8, 1976 (#74001046)	Granite Falls; 44°48′34″N 95°32′24″W	Yellow Medicine	From 1894 to 1930, this was the home of Andrew J. Volstead (1860–1947), the man who "personified prohibition." Volstead served in the U.S. House of Representatives (1903–23), where he drafted the National Prohibition Enforcement Act (1919), which became known as the Volstead Act.
25	Washburn "A" Mill Complex	Washburn "A" Mill Complex	May 4, 1983 (#83004388)	Minneapolis; 44°58′44″N 93°15′25″W	Hennepin	This mill complex was the second-largest flour mill in Minneapolis, Minnesota. The original mill was built in 1874 by Cadwallader C. Washburn, but destroyed in an explosion in 1878, killing 18. The mill was later rebuilt, and for nearly 50 years, the Washburn "A" Mill was the most technologically advanced and the largest mill in the world. It was later shut down but now operates as a historical museum of the local milling industry. It is now called the Mill City Museum.

== Historic areas in the United States National Park System ==
National Historic Sites, National Historic Parks, National Memorials, and certain other areas listed in the National Park system are historic landmarks of national importance that are highly protected already, often before the inauguration of the NHL program in 1960, and are often not also named NHLs per se. Two additional Minnesota sites have national historical importance and have been designated as National Monuments by the National Park System.

	Monument name	Image	Established	Locality	County	Description
1	Grand Portage National Monument	Grand Hall	January 27, 1960	Grand Portage; 47.962222°N 89.684722°W	Cook	The Grand Portage National Monument, located within the boreal forest on the north shore of Lake Superior in northeastern Minnesota, preserves a vital center of fur trade activity and Anishinaabeg Ojibwe heritage.
2	Pipestone National Monument	Pipestone Quarry	August 25, 1937	Pipestone; 44.013333°N 96.325278°W	Pipestone	Pipestone National Monument preserves traditional catlinite quarries just north of Pipestone, Minnesota. The catlinite, or "pipestone", was and is used to make ceremonial pipes, vitally important to traditional Plains Indian culture. The quarries are sacred to the Dakota Sioux (Lakota) Native Americans, and are historically neutral territory where all tribes could quarry stone for ceremonial pipes.

== See also ==
- List of U.S. National Historic Landmarks by state
- National Register of Historic Places listings in Minnesota
- List of Minnesota state parks
- List of National Natural Landmarks in Minnesota
- Historic preservation
- National Register of Historic Places
- History of Minnesota
