= Peter J. Linhoff =

American architect

Peter J. Linhoff (1877-1954) was an American architect who designed many houses in St. Paul, Minnesota. He also designed the William J. Fantle House in Yankton, South Dakota, which is individually listed on the National Register of Historic Places (NRHP).

He was born in Shakopee, Minnesota, in 1877. He practiced as an architect in St. Paul from about 1903 to 1940. He partnered briefly with Louis Lockwood in 1908, but otherwise worked alone. He died in St. Paul on January 24, 1954.

Works include:

- William J. Fantle House (1917), Yankton, South Dakota, NRHP-listed
- Minnie F. Lennon House (1911), 1106 Summit Avenue, St. Paul. Tudor Revival. A contributing building in West Summit Avenue Historic District. Built in 1922 according to Ramsey County property tax records, Tudor Villa in style
- Charles A. Roach House (1912), 1142 Summit Avenue, St. Paul. Brick Georgian Revival house, included in West Summit Avenue Historic District
- Dr. Carl C. Wold House (1924), 1157 Summit Avenue, Tudor Revival, included in West Summit Avenue Historic District
- George F. and Emmalyn Van Slyke House (1909), 1180 Summit Avenue, Tudor Revival, included in West Summit Avenue Historic District
- F.L. Cronhardt House (1919), 1428 Summit Avenue, Prairie style, included in West Summit Avenue Historic District
- Walter F. Lindeke House (1908), 1516 Summit Avenue, Craftsman style, included in West Summit Avenue Historic District
- Celia Friedman House (1920), 1559 Summit Avenue, Prairie style, included in West Summit Avenue Historic District
- R.H. Gerig House (1909), 1732 Summit Avenue, Craftsman style, included in West Summit Avenue Historic District
- Ben Weed House (1912), 1858 Summit Avenue, Colonial Revival, included in West Summit Avenue Historic District
- George T. Withy House (1913), 1978 Summit Avenue, Tudor Revival, included in West Summit Avenue Historic District

One or more included in Historic Hill District:

- Henry Clement House (1908), 948 Portland Avenue, has carved bargeboards in dormers, included in Historic Hill District A guidebook lists it as "Henry Clement House and Carriage House", Tudor Revival.
- Francis and Rachel Savage House (1915), 719 Linwood Ave., Georgian Revival, included in Historic Hill District (Linhoff as architect not asserted in NRHP document, but is asserted in AIA guide.)

Summit East area: Is there a Summit East Historic District, locally listed? Of Linhoff works mentioned in "Summit East" walking tour of the area, five appear not to be in either of the Historic Hill and Summit West historic districts:

- Donald S. Culver House (1912), 361 Summit Avenue, Elizabethan/Tudor Revival
- 942 Summit Avenue (1908), Georgian Revival/Colonial Revival
- Louis Silverstein House (1910), 977 Summit Avenue, Federal Revival/Spanish Colonial Revival
- Hopewell Clarke House (1913), 1027 Summit Avenue, Georgian Revival and some elements of Prairie Style
- Anna Busch House (1908), 964 Portland Avenue, Craftsman in style

There are AIA guide listings for a few.
