= Vienna and Earl Apartment Buildings =

- U.S. National Register of Historic Places
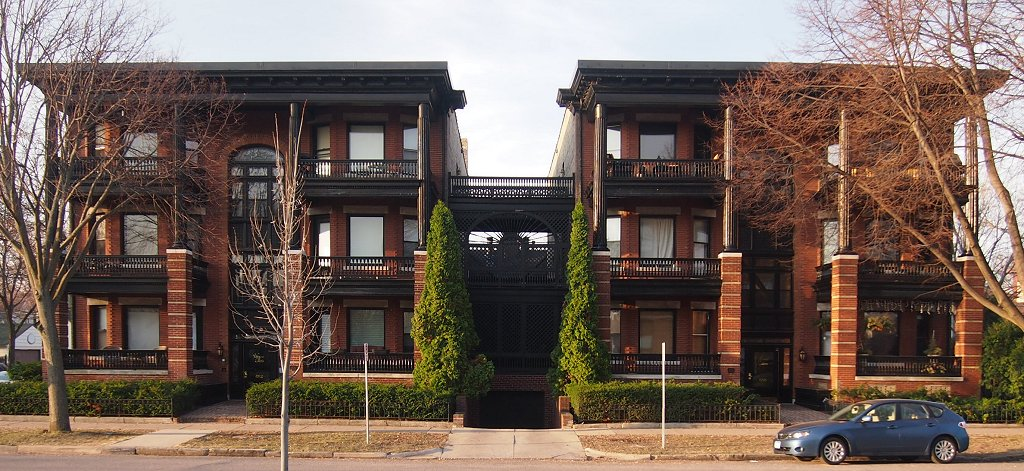

- Location within Minnesota Location within the United States
- Location: 682-688 Holly Avenue; Saint Paul, Minnesota
- Coordinates: 44°56′35″N 93°7′45″W
- Built: 1907
- Architect: Louis F. Lockwood; Carl P. Waldon
- Architectural style: Classical Revival
- NRHP reference No.: 84001685
- Added to NRHP: April 10, 1984

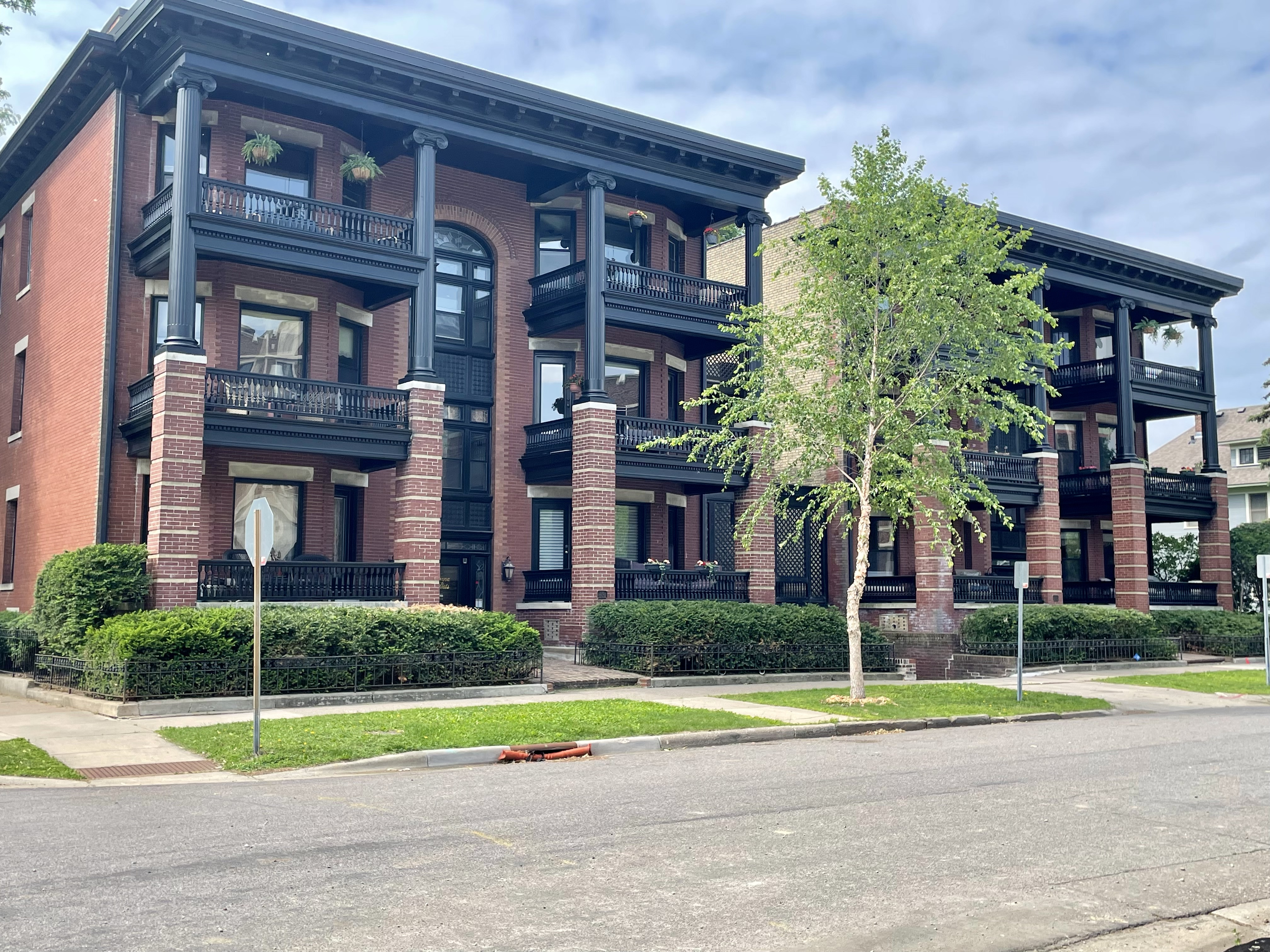
Vienna Flats

The Vienna and Earl Apartment Buildings are Neo-Classical Revival residences, built and designed in 1907 by Louis F. Lockwood and Carl P. Waldon, located 2 blocks north of Summit Avenue in Saint Paul, Minnesota. The buildings are listed on the National Register of Historic Places.

== Description ==
The Vienna and Earl are two identitical three-story brick apartment buildings in the neo-classical style. Each building contains six large luxury apartments, larger than 1300 square feet in size with oak-mantled fireplaces, oak buffets, hexagonal oak beamed ceilings, maids rooms, built-in ice boxes, and maid's bells.

== History ==
The Vienna and The Earl, built in 1907, are the last and most sophisticated neo-classical apartment building designs by Lockwood. The buildings were constructed and owned by Waldon, who named The Earl after his son.

Waldon was born in Sweden as Carl Peterso. He worked as a bricklayer and mason and in 1888 began contracting and building until his death in 1910. He constructed more turn-of-the-century apartment buildings than any other builder in St. Paul. He worked with F. A. Clark as well as Lockwood.

The Vienna and Earl was Lockwood's last apartment project design and likely Waldon's last apartment project.
