= F. Scott Fitzgerald House =

Historic house in Minnesota, United States

- U.S. National Register of Historic Places
- U.S. National Historic Landmark
- U.S. Historic district – Contributing property
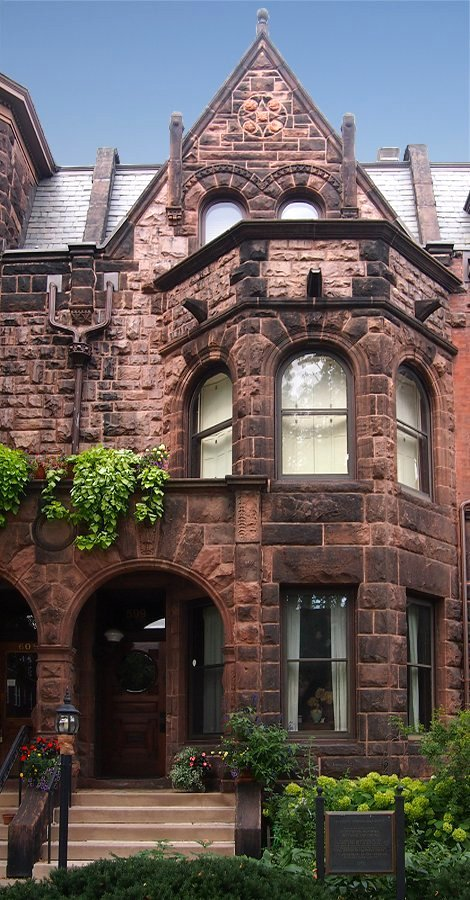
- The F. Scott Fitzgerald House, a rowhouse

- Location within Minnesota Location within the United States
- Interactive map showing the location of F. Scott Fitzgerald House
- Location: 599 Summit Avenue; Saint Paul, Minnesota
- Coordinates: 44°56′29.5″N 93°7′30.5″W
- Built: 1889
- Architect: William H. Willcox and Clarence H. Johnston Sr.
- Architectural style: Late Victorian
- Part of: Historic Hill District (ID76001067)
- NRHP reference No.: 71000440

Significant dates
- Added to NRHP: November 11, 1971
- Designated NHL: November 11, 1971

The F. Scott Fitzgerald House, also known as Summit Terrace, in Saint Paul, Minnesota, United States, is part of a group of rowhouses designed by William H. Willcox and Clarence H. Johnston Sr. The house, at 599 Summit Avenue, is listed as a National Historic Landmark for its association with author F. Scott Fitzgerald. The design of the houses was described as the "New York Style" in which each unit was given a distinctive character found in some rowhouses in eastern cities. Architecture critic Larry Millett describes it as "A brownstone row house that leaves no Victorian style unaccounted for, although the general flavor is Romanesque Revival." The Fitzgerald house is faced with brownstone and is two bays wide with a polygonal two-story window bay on the right, and the entrance, recessed under a round arch that is flush with the bay front, on the left. The mansard roof has a cross-gable with two round-arch windows and decorative finials.

Fitzgerald's parents, Edward and Mollie, moved back to St. Paul in 1914 while F. Scott Fitzgerald was a student at Princeton University. They lived in the unit at 593 Summit Avenue for a while, then moved to the 599 Summit Avenue unit in 1918. In July and August 1919, Fitzgerald rewrote the manuscript that became his first novel, This Side of Paradise. He lived there until January 1920 before moving to New Orleans. Of the several places the Fitzgerald family lived, this one is most closely associated with his literary fame, and typifies the environments of some of his later works.

It was declared a National Historic Landmark in 1971. It is also a contributing property to the Historic Hill District, listed in 1976.

Fitzgerald was noted for disliking Summit Avenue, calling it "a mausoleum of American architectural monstrosities".

== See also ==
- List of National Historic Landmarks in Minnesota
- National Register of Historic Places listings in Ramsey County, Minnesota
