= Kimball City Hall =

- Kimball Prairie Village Hall
- U.S. National Register of Historic Places
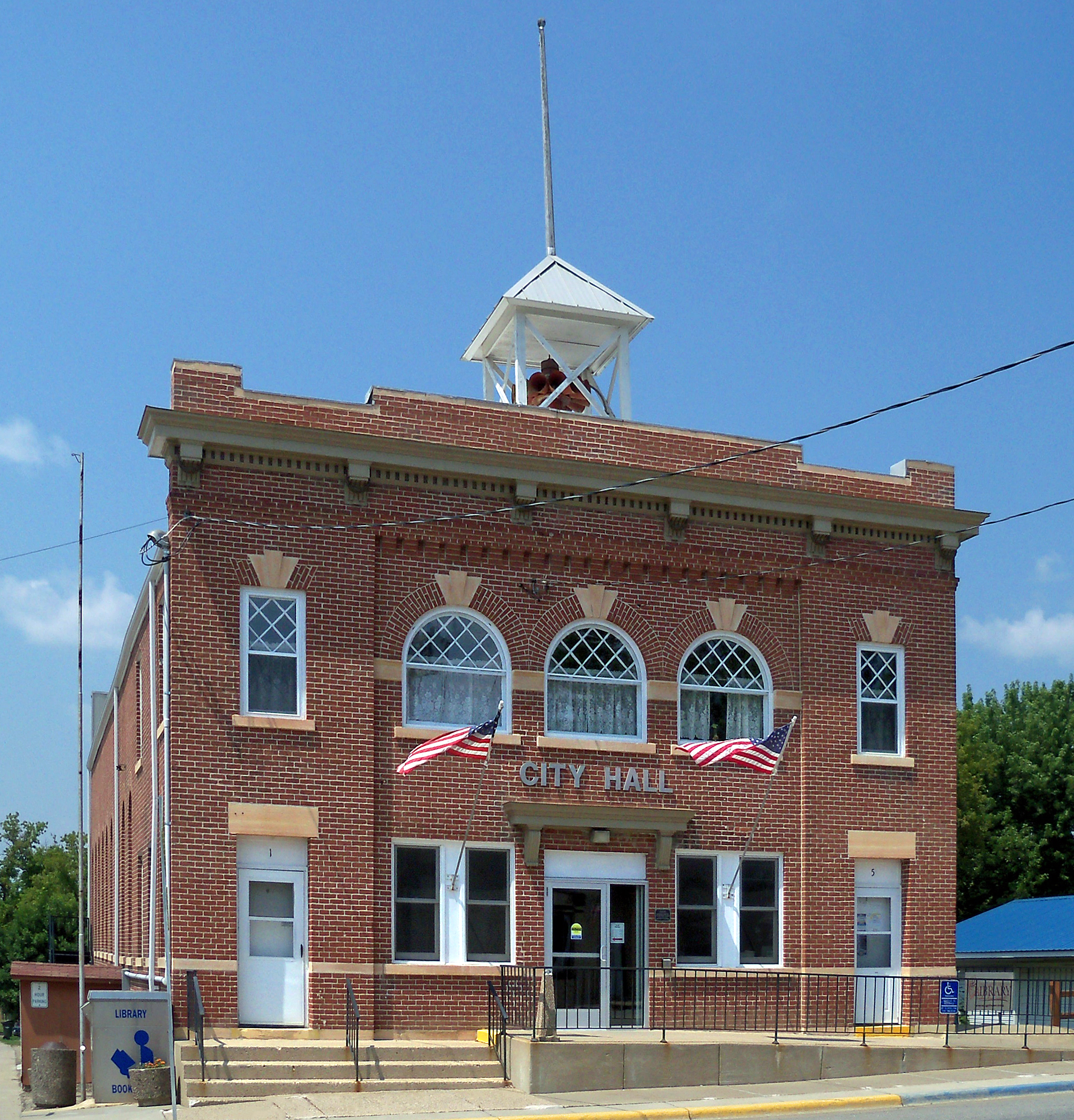
- Kimball Prairie City Hall viewed from the east-southeast

- Location within Minnesota Location within the United States
- Location: 1 Main Street N., Kimball, Minnesota
- Coordinates: 45°18′45.4″N 94°18′3″W
- Area: Less than one acre
- Built: 1908
- Architect: Louis Lockwood
- MPS: Stearns County MRA
- NRHP reference No.: 82003045
- Added to NRHP: April 15, 1982

Kimball City Hall is the seat of local government for Kimball, Minnesota, United States. It was built in 1908 when the community was still a village known as Kimball Prairie. When it first opened the hall housed offices for local government, professionals, and the telephone utility, as well as a public library and a municipal theater. The building was listed on the National Register of Historic Places in 1982 as Kimball Prairie Village Hall for its local significance in the theme of politics/government. It was nominated for embodying the importance the community placed on local government and public services in the early 20th century.

It was designed by architect Louis Lockwood.

== See also ==
- List of city and town halls in the United States
- National Register of Historic Places listings in Stearns County, Minnesota
