= James J. Hill House =

Historic house in Minnesota, U.S.

- U.S. National Register of Historic Places
- U.S. National Historic Landmark
- U.S. Historic district – Contributing property
- Minnesota State Register of Historic Places
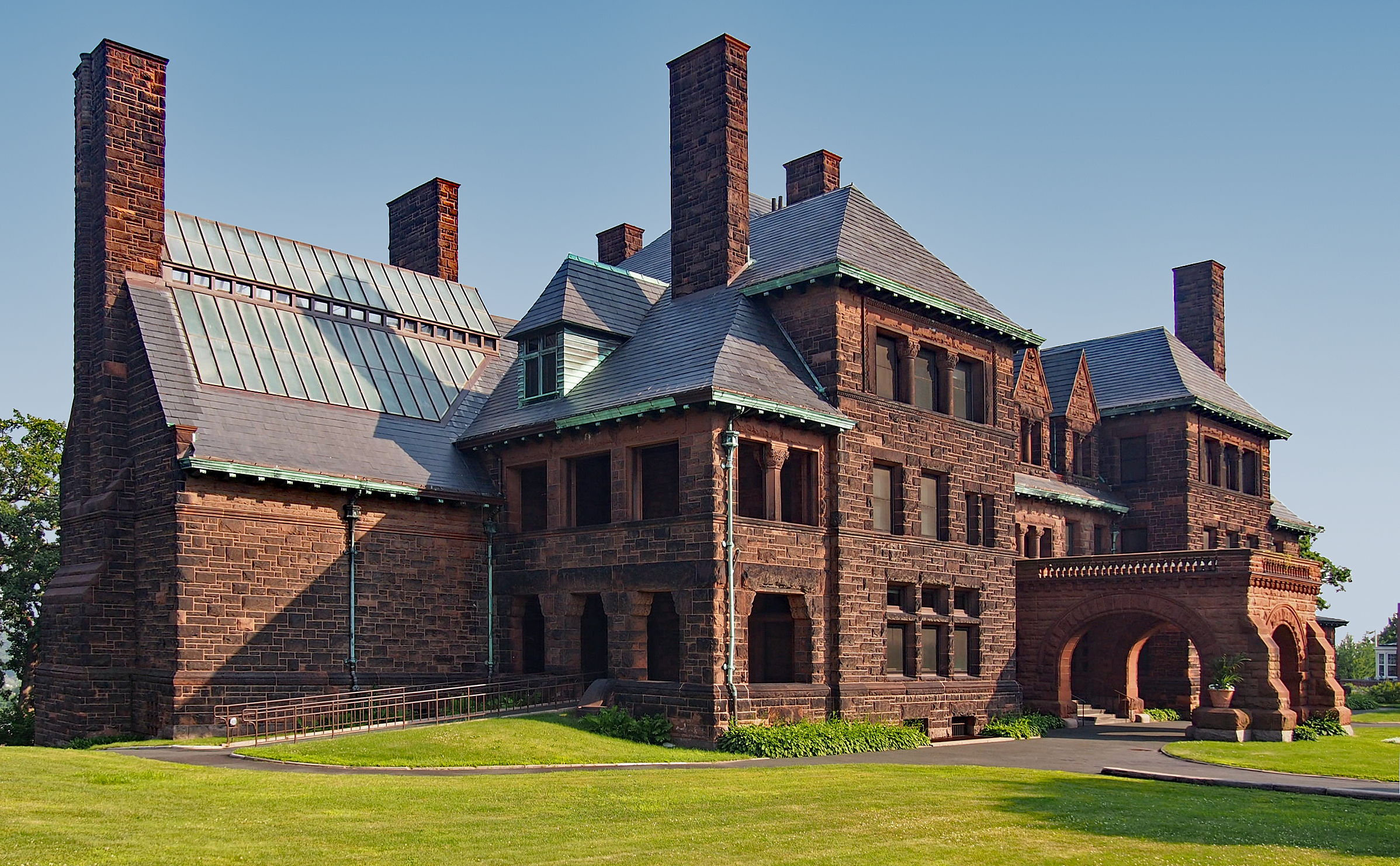
- The James J. Hill House from the north

- Location within Minnesota Location within the United States
- Location: 240 Summit Avenue; Saint Paul, Minnesota
- Coordinates: 44°56′42″N 93°6′32″W
- Built: 1891
- Architect: Peabody and Stearns, Mark Fitzpatrick
- Architectural style: Richardsonian Romanesque
- Part of: Historic Hill District (ID76001067)
- NRHP reference No.: 66000405

Significant dates
- Added to NRHP: October 15, 1966
- Designated NHL: November 5, 1961

The James J. Hill House is the former mansion of railroad magnate James J. Hill, today operated as a museum home. It is located in Saint Paul, Minnesota, United States, towards the eastern end of Summit Avenue near the Cathedral of Saint Paul. Completed in 1891, the house has 36,000 square feet (3,300 m^{2}) of living area and 44,552 square feet (4,139.0 m^{2}) of total space. During Hill's lifetime it was regarded as the "showcase of St. Paul".

It is listed as a U.S. National Historic Landmark, operated by the Minnesota Historical Society. It is also a contributing property to the Historic Hill District.

== History ==
James J. Hill became wealthy as the chief executive officer of the Great Northern Railway. He had a large family of 10 children, and built a substantial home in Saint Paul in 1878 in the Lowertown area near Ninth and Canada streets.

In 1882, during an era when wealthy citizens were scrambling to build fashionable homes on Summit Avenue, Hill bought three lots in the neighborhood. The street offered a commanding view of downtown St. Paul and the Mississippi River area, making it a highly desirable location.

As new warehouses and railroad tracks crowded the Lowertown residential area, and as Hill's collection of paintings and sculpture overflowed the house, the Hill family thought it was desirable to move. Hill also realized that recent improvements in home technology, such as electric lighting, plumbing, ventilation, and fireproofing, could be incorporated into a new home. Moreover, since Hill was growing in social prominence in the community, a new home would befit his status as the "Empire Builder" of northern railroads.

The house was designed by an East Coast architectural firm, Peabody, Stearns and Furber, at a time when local architects such as Clarence Johnston and Cass Gilbert were employed on other homes in the neighborhood. It emerged in the Richardsonian Romanesque style, with a massive, rugged appearance featuring randomly sized blocks of stone, sturdy pillars, rounded arches, and a generally strong horizontal emphasis.

Hill supervised the design and construction closely. As an example, when the Lewis Comfort Tiffany Company submitted designs for the stained glass windows, Hill replied that they were, "anything but what I want," and the job went to A.B. Cutter and Company of Boston. Later, in 1889, Hill fired the architects because they had overridden his orders to the stonecutters in Massachusetts, and hired the Boston firm of Irving and Casson to finish the project.

The St. Paul Pioneer Press reviewed the house just before it was completed in 1891, writing:

Solid, substantial, roomy, and comfortable is the new home of James J. Hill and family. ... There has been no attempt at display, no desire to flaunt an advertisement of wealth in the eyes of the world. Just a family home ... impressive, fine, even grand in the simplicity of design, but after all a St. Paul home.

Hill died in 1916, and his wife followed in 1921. After their parents’ passing, the children eventually moved out.

== Interior ==
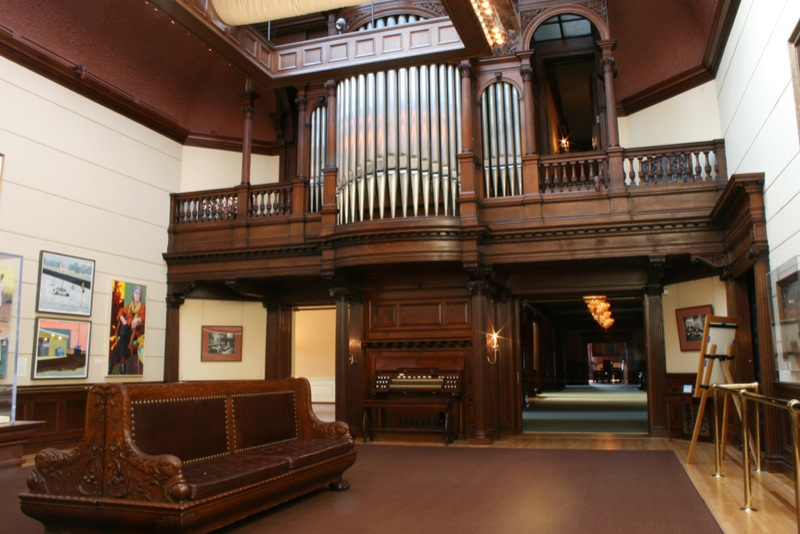
Pipe organ in the art gallery

The first floor featured a drawing room, dining room, music room, library, Mr. Hill's home office, and an art gallery that housed Hill's collection of painting and sculpture. It has a pipe organ, installed after someone suggested to Hill that other wealthy people had pipe organs in their homes.

The second floor contained Mr. and Mrs. Hill's rooms, two guest rooms, and rooms for their five daughters, Gertrude, Rachel, Clara, Ruth, and Charlotte.

The third floor contained rooms for their sons James, Walter, and Louis (who later succeeded his father as president of the Great Northern Railway). It also had a room that served as a gymnasium and school room for the children, as well as quarters for the servants.

Stained woodwork is featured broadly throughout the house. Hand-carving, finely detailed but restrained in ornament, is found in the central hallway, the music room, and the formal dining room, which also has gold leaf plate on its ceiling. Other rooms in the house, particularly on the second floor where most of the family members lived, simply have richly colored and nicely detailed woodwork.

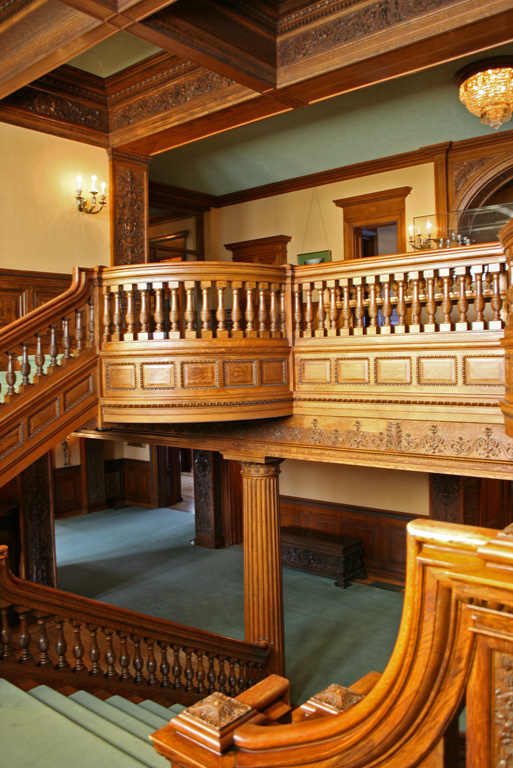
The grand staircase

The house had a hybrid system of gas and electric lighting, with rotary switches on the walls for the electric lights. However, no electrical outlets were installed, as during that era electricity was only used for lighting.

== As a church property ==
In 1925, four of the Hill daughters purchased the house from the estate and donated it to the Archdiocese of Saint Paul and Minneapolis. The church used it for the next fifty-three years as space for offices, residences, and a teacher's college for women. The church preserved it well and did not make any significant alterations, although most of the original furniture was sold during this period. In 1961, the United States Department of the Interior designated the house a National Historic Landmark.

== As a museum home ==
The Minnesota Historical Society acquired the house in 1978, after the Archdiocese consolidated its offices elsewhere. The house was restored and is now open for tours.

== Photo gallery ==
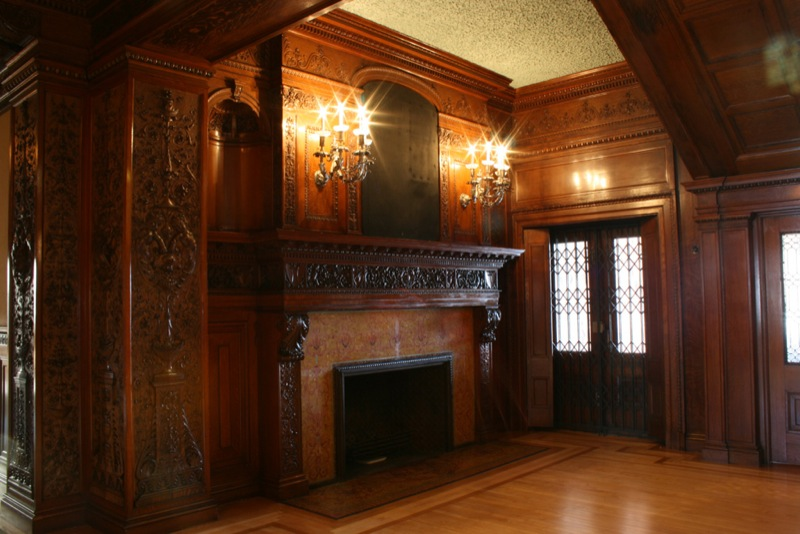
Main fireplace

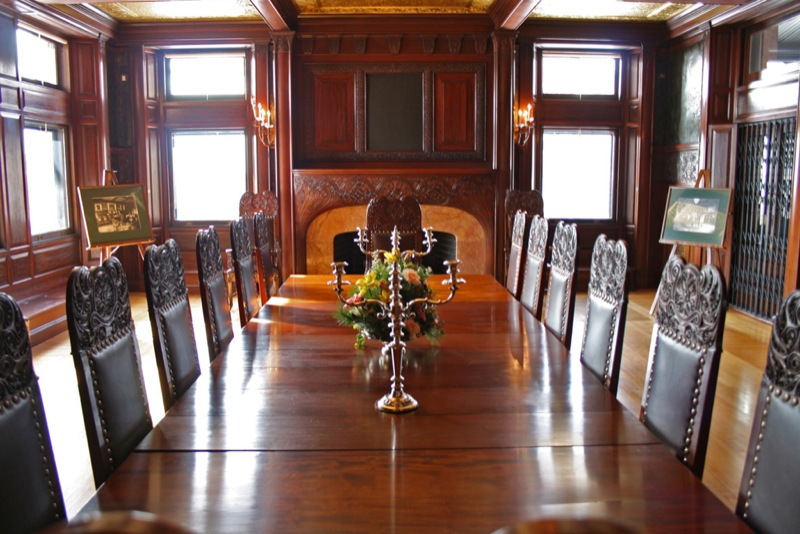
Dining room

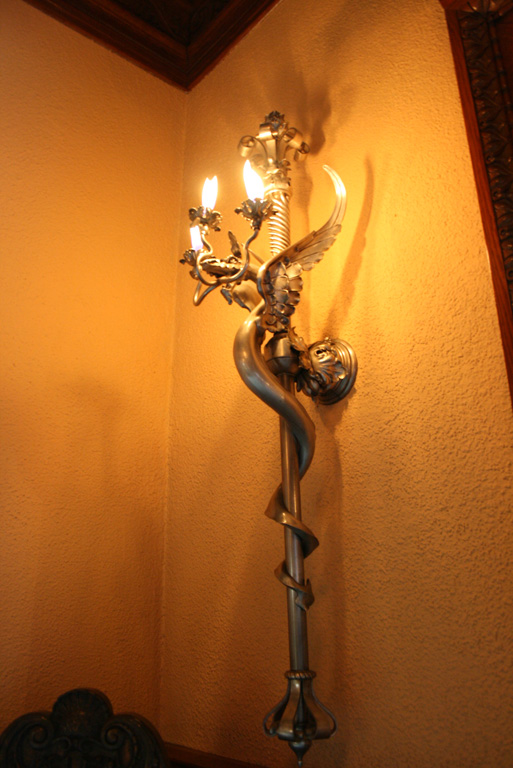
Gas light dragon sconce

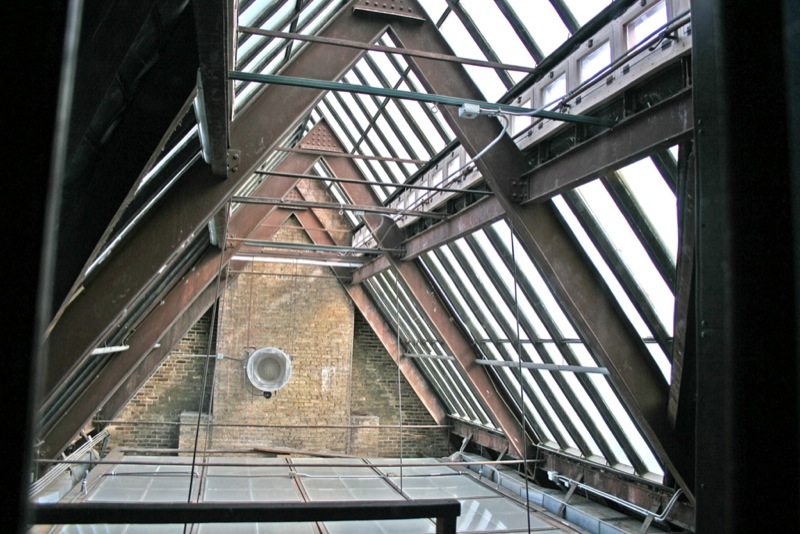
Upper skylight

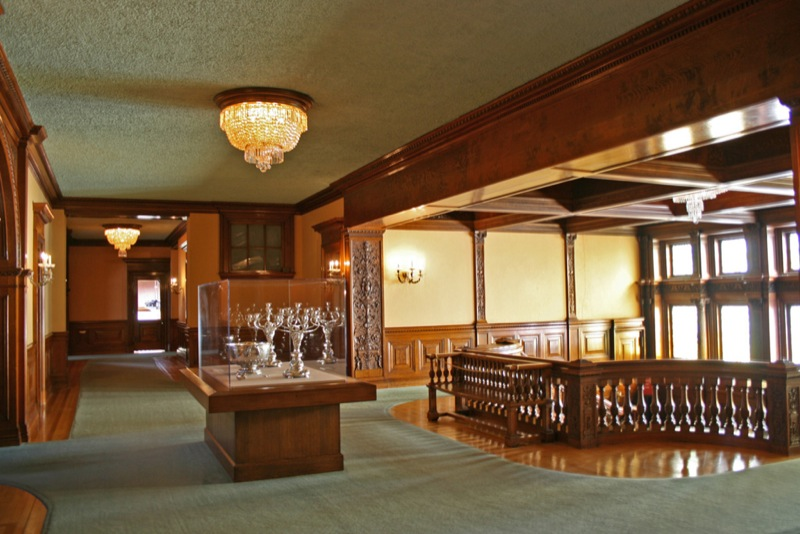
Second floor landing

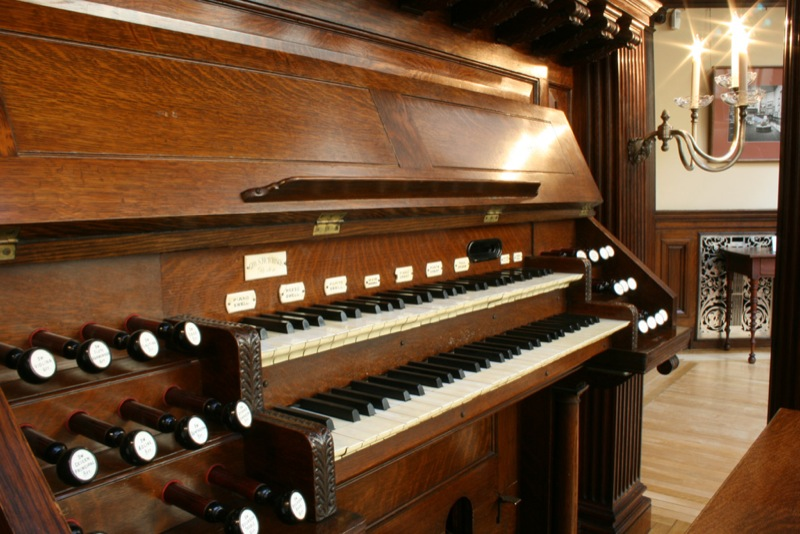
Pipe organ

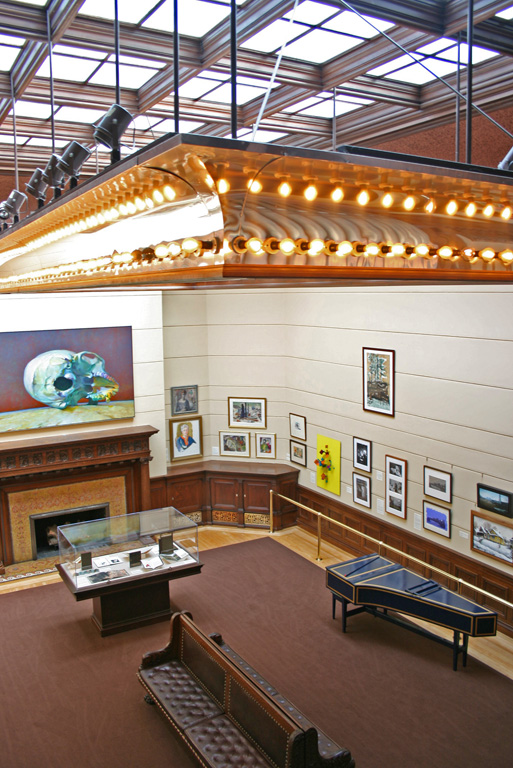
Upper view of the art gallery

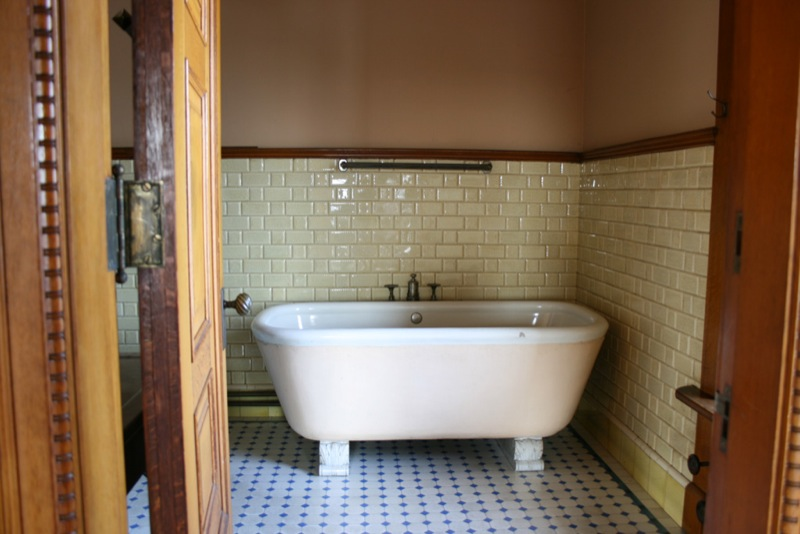
James J. Hill's original tub

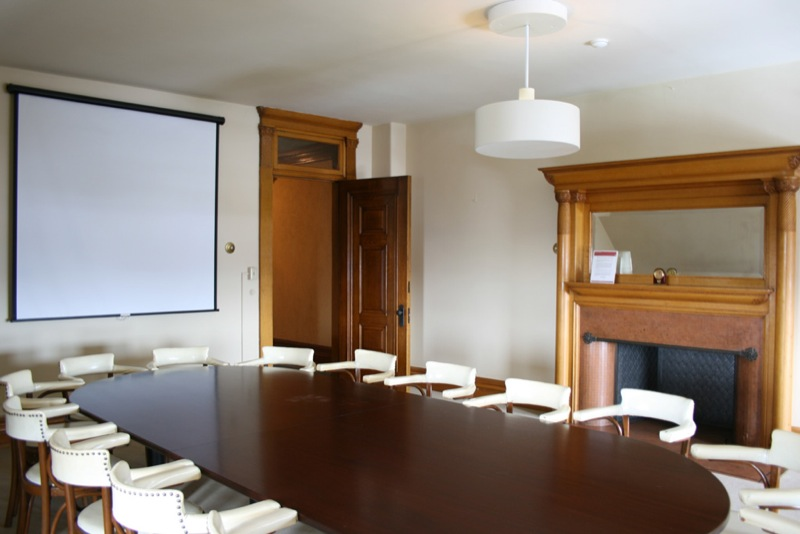
Conference room on the third floor

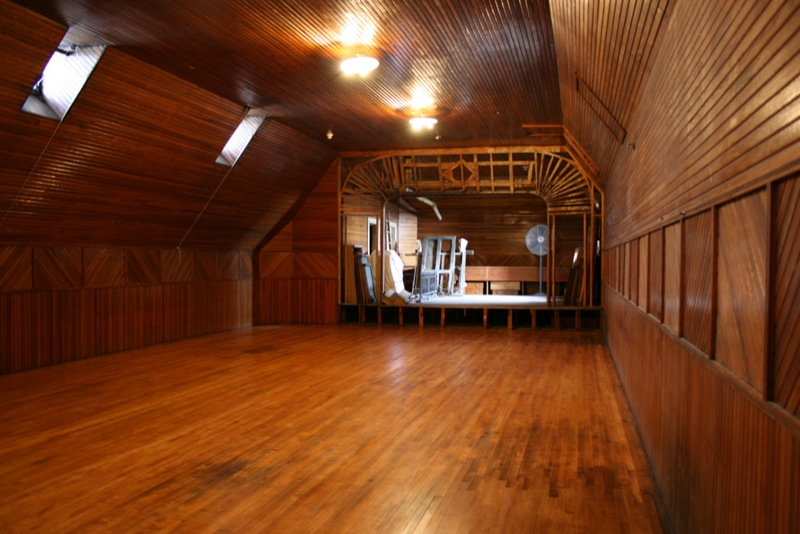
Attic

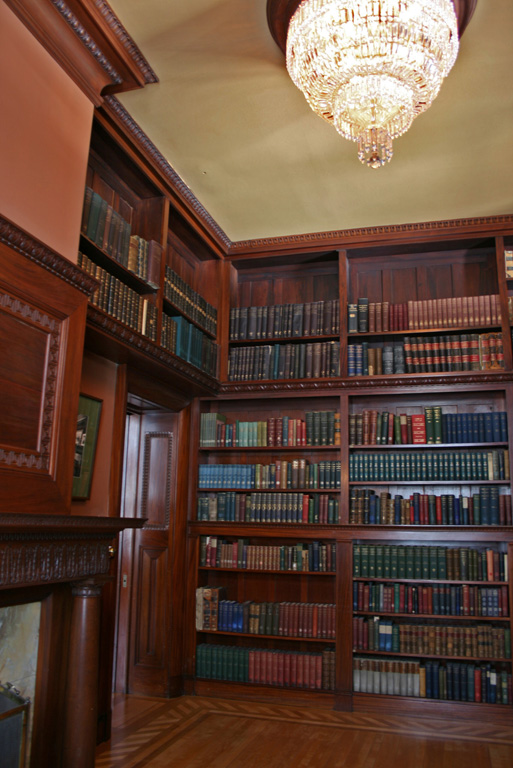
Library

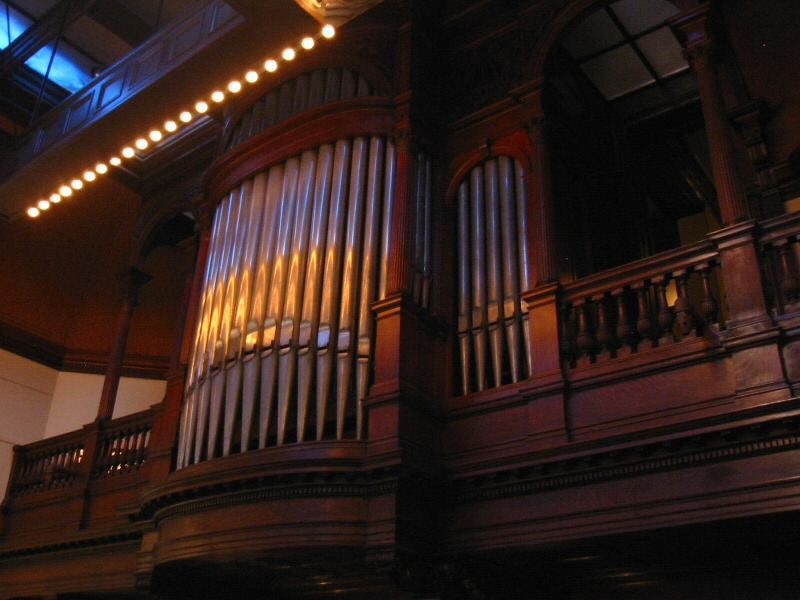
Pipe organ in the art gallery

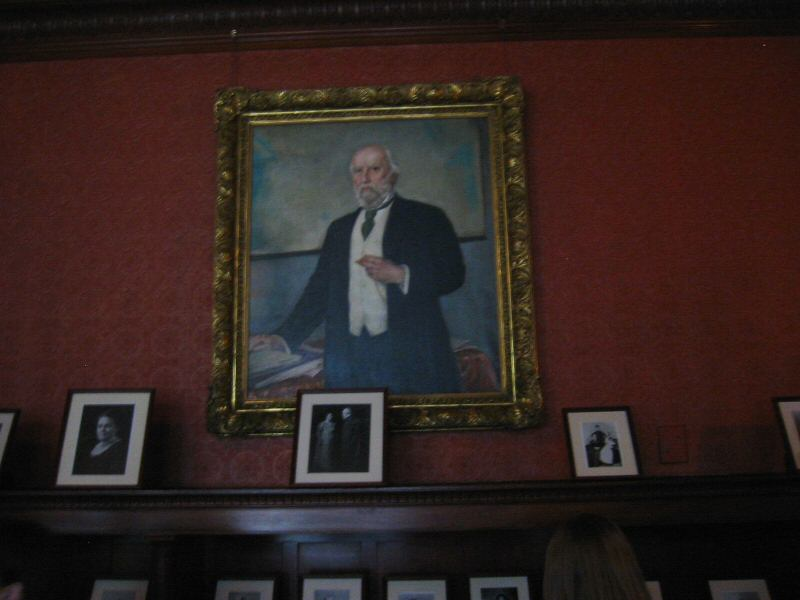
Portrait of James J. Hill in the library

== See also ==
- List of National Historic Landmarks in Minnesota
- National Register of Historic Places listings in Ramsey County, Minnesota
