= Germanic-American Institute =

Cultural institute in Saint Paul, Minnesota, United States

Coordinates: 44°56′40″N 93°6′45″W

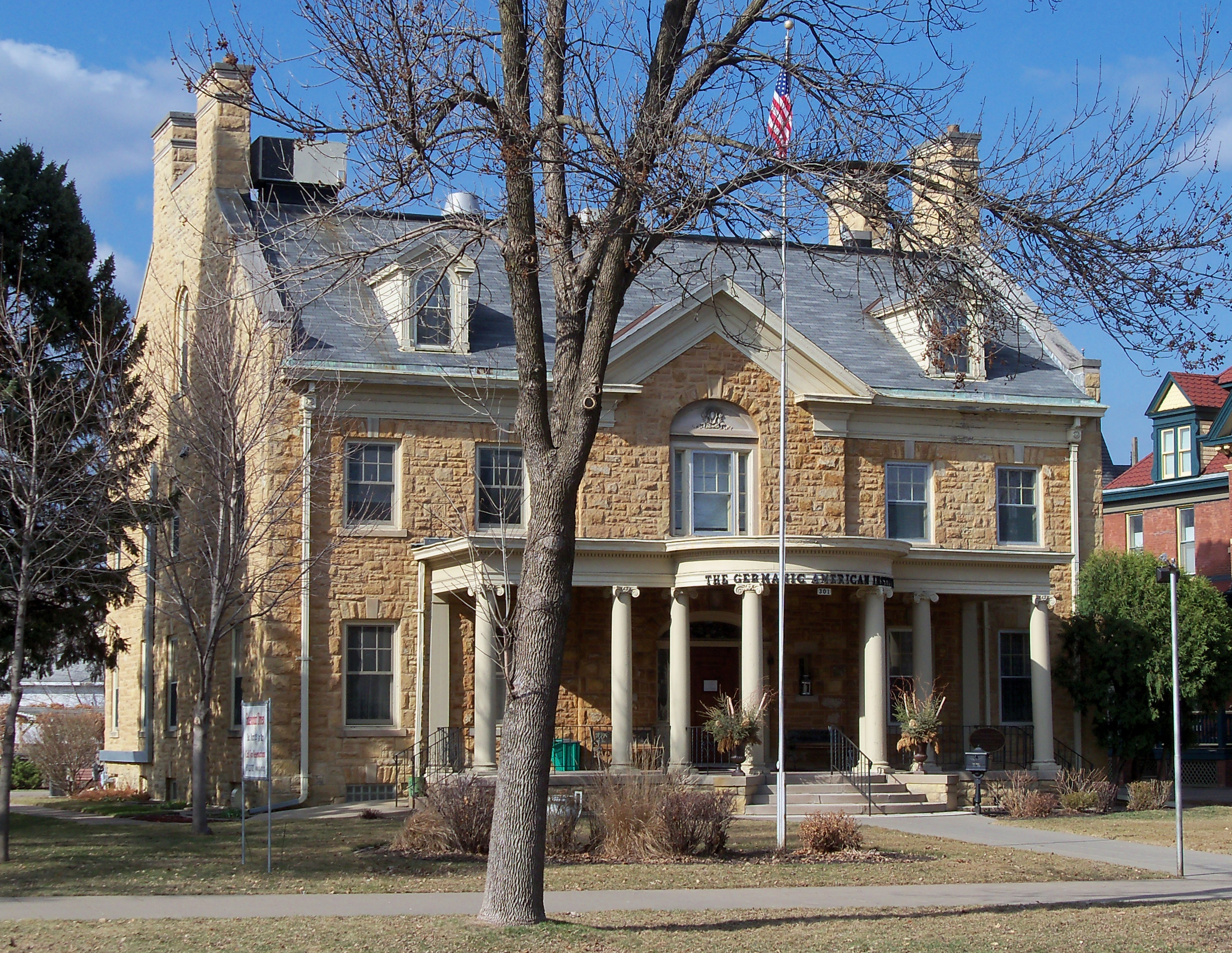
- Volksfest Kulturhaus
- Former name: Volksfest Association
- Established: 1957
- Location: 301 Summit Avenue, Saint Paul, Minnesota
- Executive director: Jeana Anderson
- Website: gaimn.org

The Germanic-American Institute (GAI) is a nonprofit language & culture organization based in Saint Paul, Minnesota, United States. Its mission is “connecting people to a broader world through German language and culture”.

== Origin ==
In 1957, a group of German clubs based in the Minneapolis–Saint Paul metropolitan area came together to form the Volksfest Association, which represented German Minnesotans at that year's centennial statehood celebration. After the centennial, eager to obtain an official building, it raised money through selling bonds and organizing fundraising events. In 1965, it purchased a home on Summit Avenue for $57,500 (equivalent to $587,447 in 2025) and refurbished the interior to accommodate large social gatherings.

Originally built in 1906 for the family of George W. Gardner and his wife, Claribel, the 301 Summit Avenue home had four stories, including a third-floor ballroom and ratskeller. After George and Claribel's deaths in 1934 and 1938, respectively, the house was owned by their son, Truman. In 1948, Truman sold the house to the Sisters of St. Benedict, and it became known as St. Paul's Priory. By the 1960s the Sisters of St. Benedict had outgrown the property, and in 1965 they sold it to the Volksfest Association before moving to Maplewood, Minnesota.

Later that year, the Volksfest Association moved into the Gardner home and began to use it as its headquarters. They called it the Volksfest Kulturhaus—German for "culture center". The building also served as a community hub where German Americans, Minnesotans of German heritage, and anyone interested in German culture could come to learn and celebrate.

== Later history ==
During the 1980s and 1990s, the Volksfest Association board of directors underwent a generational shift as younger members replaced older ones. In 1994 members decide to transform the organization from a social club into a non-profit institute and rename it the Germanic-American Institute, or GAI for short. The organization's shift in focus was also precipitated by an influx of non-Germanic immigrants to the Minneapolis area, as well as the perceived disconnect between newer generations and their German heritage.

In the 1990s, many public schools in the metro area began to drop German-language classes from their curricula. In response, the GAI founded the Twin Cities German Immersion School in 2005. Among other programs, the GAI offers a summer language camps for children, provides comprehensive German language instruction to adults ranging from new to fluent speakers, and hosts events and speakers that celebrate and promote understanding of German culture, traditions, and history.

In the 2010s, the GAI board of directors anticipated another generational shift. It recognized that although German American millennials had grown up in a globally connected world, they were further removed from their German heritage than ever before. To adapt to this change, the GAI began restoration projects for the house and parking lot and planned new programs to attract younger generations of visitors.
