= William J. Fantle House =

- U.S. National Register of Historic Places
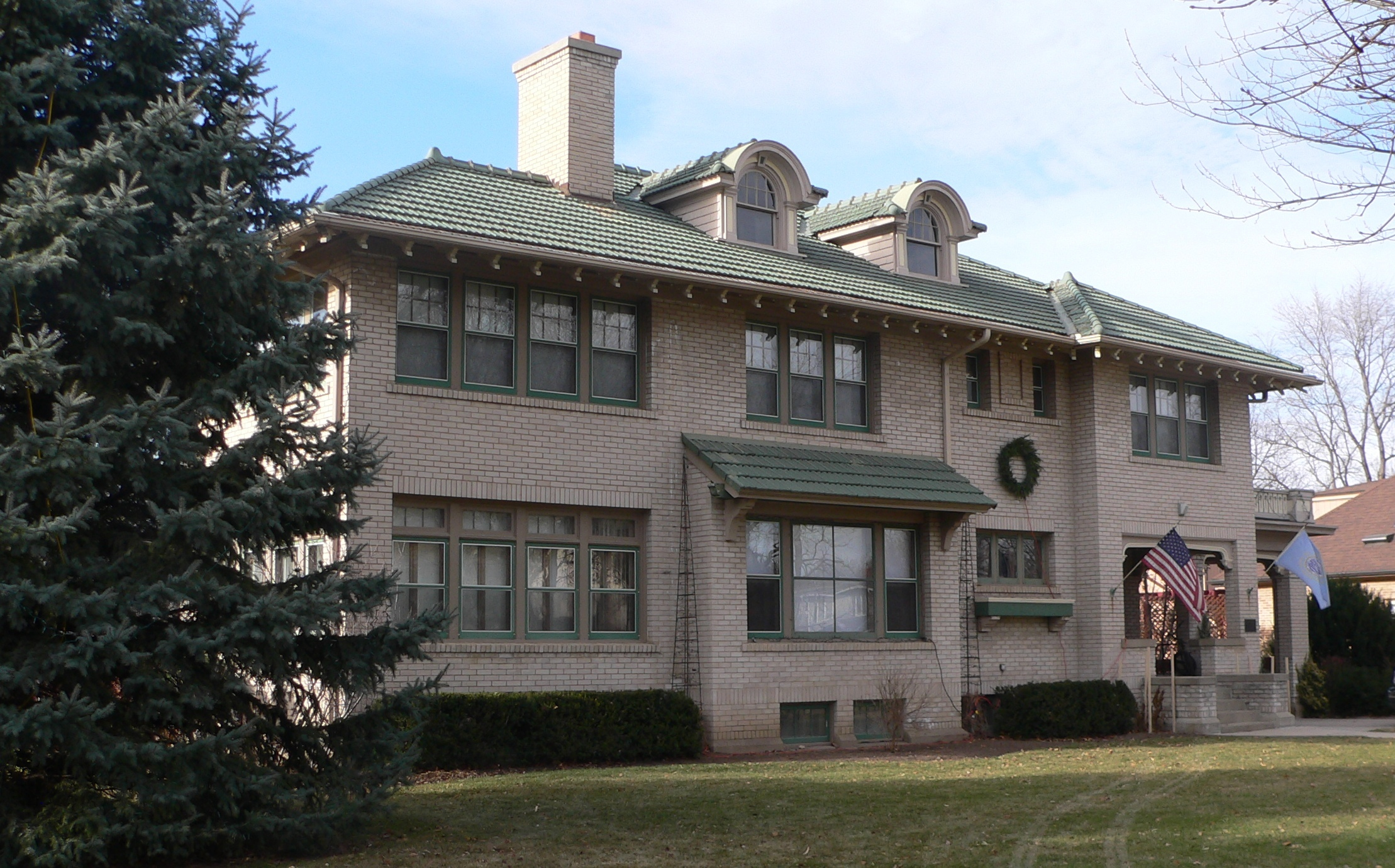
- The house in 2010

- Location within South Dakota Location within the United States
- Location: 1201 Douglas, Yankton, South Dakota
- Coordinates: 42°52′57″N 97°23′31″W
- Area: less than one acre
- Built: 1917
- Architect: Peter J. Linhoff
- Architectural style: Prairie School
- NRHP reference No.: 89001588
- Added to NRHP: October 10, 1989

The William J. Fantle House is a historic house in Yankton, South Dakota. It was built in 1917 for William J. Fantle, the co-founder of Fantle Bros, a dry good store. It was designed in the Prairie School style by architect Peter J. Linhoff. It has been listed on the National Register of Historic Places since October 10, 1989.
