= Pierce and Walter Butler House =

Historic house in Minnesota, United States

- U.S. National Register of Historic Places
- U.S. Historic district – Contributing property
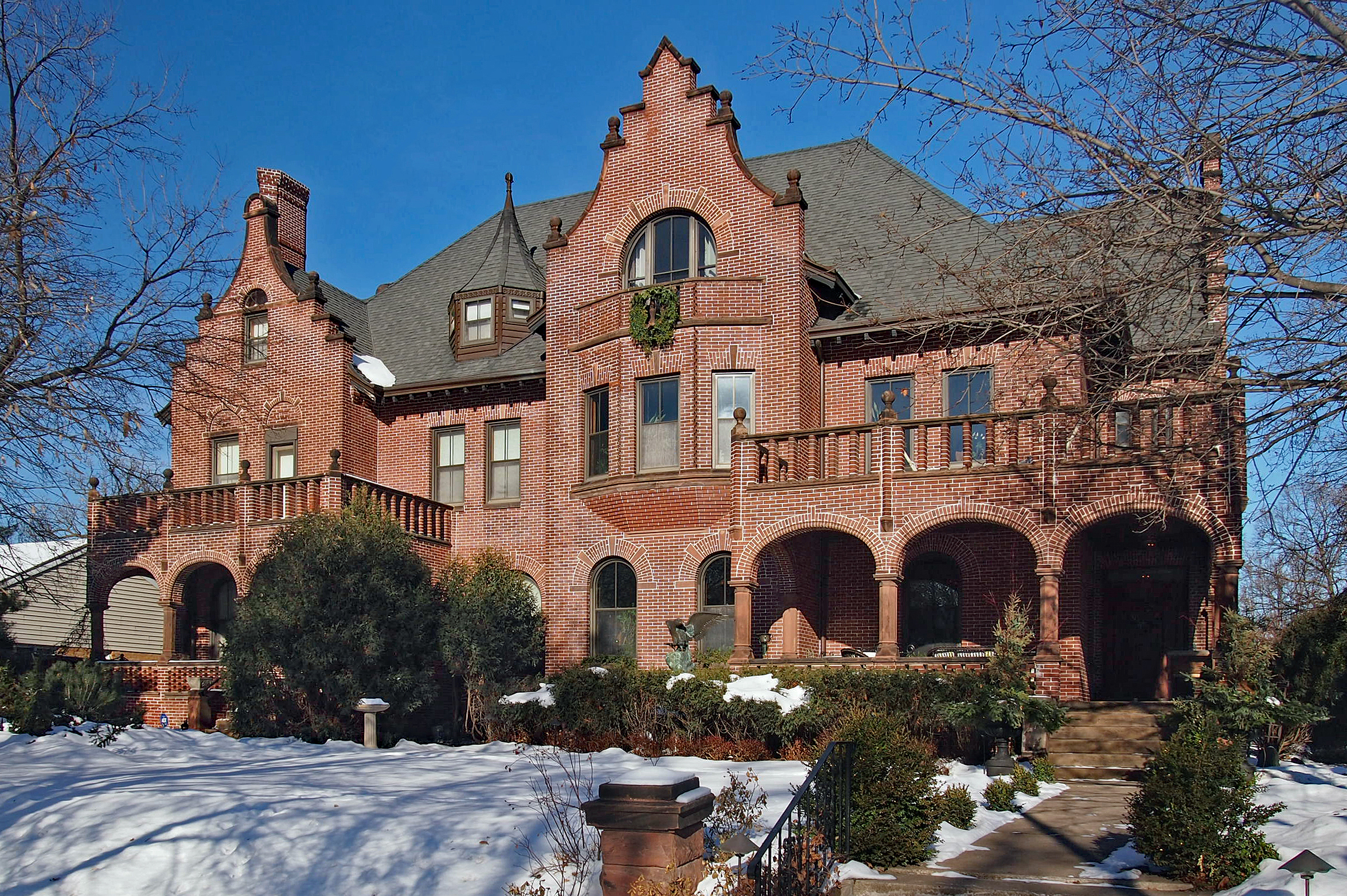
- The Pierce and Walter Butler House from the south-southeast

- Location within Minnesota Location within the United States
- Location: 1345–1347 Summit Ave., Saint Paul, Minnesota
- Coordinates: 44°56′31″N 93°9′25″W
- Area: less than one acre
- Built: 1900
- Architect: Clarence H. Johnston; Butler Brothers
- Architectural style: Renaissance
- Part of: West Summit Avenue Historic District (ID93000332)
- NRHP reference No.: 82004625
- Added to NRHP: April 22, 1982

The Pierce and Walter Butler House is a side-by-side duplex, in the West Summit Avenue Historic District of Saint Paul, Minnesota.

== Description and history ==
The house was built in 1900 by Clarence H. Johnston, Sr. for United States Supreme Court justice Pierce Butler and his brother, construction magnate Walter Butler, father of Robert Butler.
