= Frank B. Kellogg House =

Historic house in Minnesota, United States

- U.S. National Register of Historic Places
- U.S. National Historic Landmark
- U.S. Historic district – Contributing property
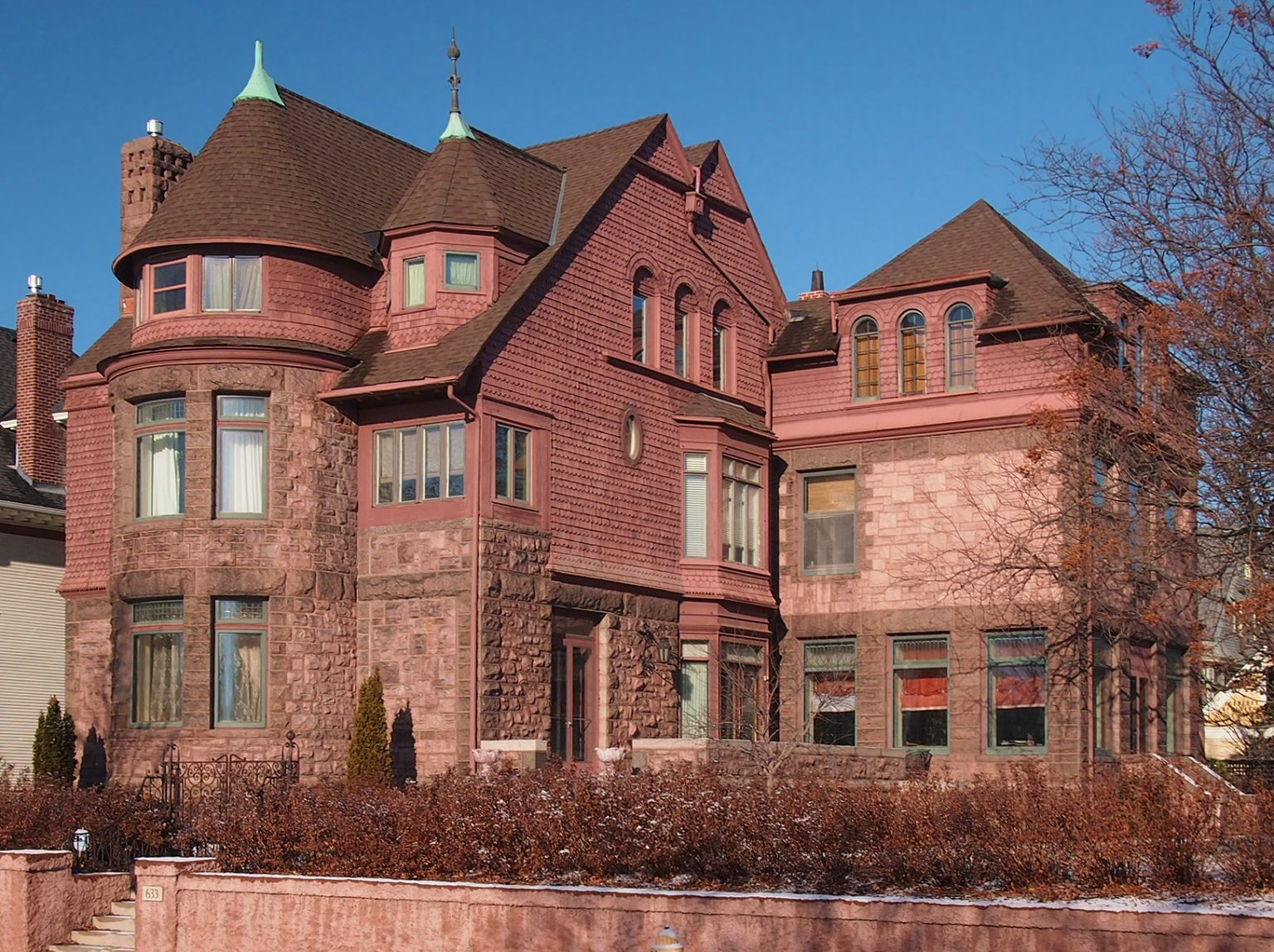
- The Frank B. Kellogg House from the southeast

- Location within Minnesota Location within the United States
- Interactive map showing the location of Kellogg House
- Location: 633 Fairmount Ave. St. Paul, Minnesota
- Coordinates: 44°56′14.09″N 93°7′35.8″W
- Area: less than one acre
- Built: 1889
- Architectural style: Queen Anne, Romanesque
- Part of: Historic Hill District (ID76001067)
- NRHP reference No.: 74001035

Significant dates
- Added to NRHP: November 6, 1974
- Designated NHL: December 8, 1976
- Designated CP: August 13, 1976

The Frank B. Kellogg House is a historic house at 633 Fairmount Avenue in Saint Paul, Minnesota, United States. It is listed as a National Historic Landmark for its association with Nobel Peace Prize-winner Frank B. Kellogg, co-author of the Kellogg–Briand Pact. Kellogg Boulevard in downtown Saint Paul is also named for him. The house was designated a National Historic Landmark in 1976. It is also a contributing property to the Historic Hill District.

The house is a large 2 1/2-story structure, built mostly out of a variety of stone, including granite, sandstone, and brownstone. The original rectangular block was designed by William H. Willcox and completed in 1890, and exhibits a blend of Queen Anne and Romanesque styling. In 1923 Kellogg added a large addition, designed by Allen H. Stem was constructed on the north-east side of the house, reorienting the front from Fairmount Avenue to Dale Street. This addition was called the "Coolidge Wing", although it is not clear whether it was built before or after President Calvin Coolidge visited Kellogg here in 7 - 8 June 1925. The house is one of two surviving structures closely associated with Kellogg; the other is in Washington, D.C.

From 1889 until his death, this was the permanent residence of Frank B. Kellogg (1856–1937), lawyer, U.S. Senator, and diplomat. As Secretary of State from 1925 to 1929, he negotiated the 1928 Kellogg–Briand Pact—for which he received the Nobel Peace Prize—and shifted foreign policy away from interventionism. He died at home in 1937, on the eve of his 81st birthday from pneumonia, following a stroke.

== See also ==
- List of National Historic Landmarks in Minnesota
- National Register of Historic Places listings in Ramsey County, Minnesota
