= William H. Willcox =

- Born: May 26, 1832; Brooklyn, New York
- Died: February 1, 1929 (aged 96); Yountville, California
- Occupation: Architect

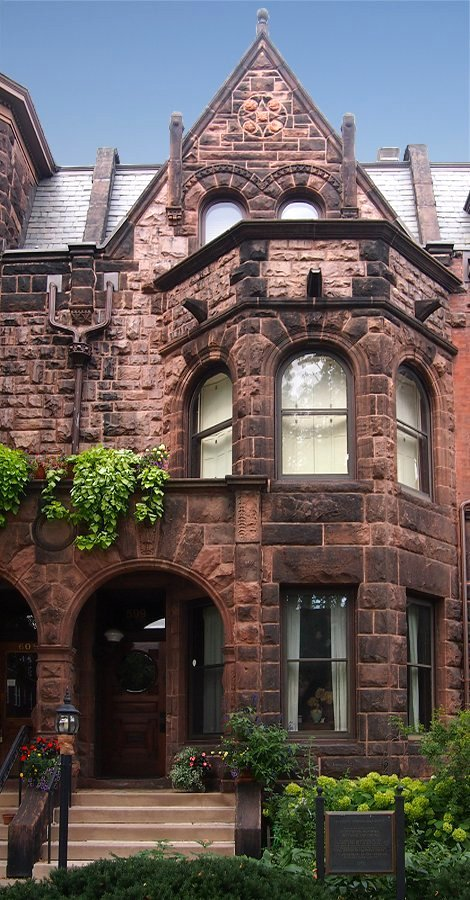
One of the New York-style Richardsonian Romanesque rowhouses called "Summit Terrace", designed by Johnston and Willcox in Saint Paul, Minnesota, noted as the F. Scott Fitzgerald House

William H. Willcox (May 26, 1832 – February 1, 1929) was an American architect and surveyor who practised in New York, Chicago, St. Paul, Seattle, Los Angeles, and San Francisco.

Willcox's first appearance is as the designer of a "Suburban Octagonal Cottage" illustrated in plan and elevation in John Bullock, The American Cottage Builder: A Series of Designs, Plans, and Specifications (New York: Stringer & Townshend) 1854:239f; the design, which could be well executed in wood for about $1500, was described at length in Willcox's own words. In later life Willcox claimed to have been the uncredited architect of Grammar School 51 at 519 West 44th Street, New York City, built in 1858.

He served in the American Civil War with the 95th New York Infantry, December 1861 to September 1863, as a topographical engineer who prepared the well-known map of the battle of Antietam for Brig. Gen. Abner Doubleday, and reaching the rank of lieutenant before he was released after Gettysburg. After his release from service, in partnership with the well-known New York architect Gamaliel King, he assisted in constructing the Kings County Savings Bank in Williamsburgh, Brooklyn, built 1860-67.

Willcox relocated to Chicago by 1871, where he was briefly employed by Dankmar Adler. He opened his own office in Chicago by 1872, practicing in the city until 1879; from 1875 to 1877 he was a partner in the Chicago firm Willcox and Miller. After 1879 Willcox moved to Nebraska, where he remained through 1881. Willcox was architect of the Nebraska State Capitol building (1879-1882, destroyed), as well as several other institutional structures in Nebraska.

Willcox may have returned briefly to Chicago, but by 1882, he had relocated to St. Paul, Minnesota. In 1883 he designed the Cairo, Illinois Public Library, described as a "Queen Anne style" structure of red pressed brick, with pale brick and terracotta details., but most of his work was in smaller towns and cities in Minnesota and northern Wisconsin.

In 1884, Willcox published Hints to Those Who Propose to Build—Also a Description of Improved Plans for the Construction of Churches (St. Paul: Pioneer Press, 1884), which included a list of his most important projects to that date.

In 1886 Willcox entered a partnership with the younger Clarence H. Johnston, Sr. (1859-1936), whom he may have known in New York. Willcox and Johnston never received commercial commissions, but the partnership produced many notable buildings, including the "Summit Terrace" row (St. Paul), of which one was the F. Scott Fitzgerald House (illustration, above right); the First Baptist Church (Chicago); the main building of Macalester College (St. Paul); the Mercantile Library (Peoria, Illinois); and St. Peter's Protestant Episcopal Church, 1888 (Dayton's Bluff, St. Paul) Willcox and Johnston dissolved their partnership in 1890.

In 1891 Willcox relocated to Seattle, Washington, where he entered a partnership with the established Seattle architect William E. Boone. Boone and Willcox supervised completion of the spectacular New York Building (1889-1892, demolished), which Boone had already designed. Boone and Willcox together were responsible for design of the J. M. Frink Building (Washington Iron Works Building/Washington Shoe Building) (1891–92), and the Plymouth Congregational Church (1891–92, destroyed)--this church likely reflects Willcox's extensive experience with church design in the Midwest. Boone and Willcox also prepared a plan for the University of Washington campus in 1891, but construction never went forward. Boone and Willcox dissolved their partnership in June 1892. Willcox had less success on his own, and moved to Los Angeles in 1895 after the Panic of 1893 dried up architectural work in Seattle.

Willcox arrived in California and established a practice in Los Angeles, where directories list his offices at 345 Bradbury Block. In 1896 the architect Henry F. Starbuck, who later practiced in Fresno, maintained his Los Angeles office at the same address in the Bradbury Block. In 1896 Willcox entered a competition for the design of a new Kings County Courthouse and was awarded the commission, though the Board asked the architect to revise his plans to eliminate a central dome and apply the cost savings to a ten-foot basement.

In 1898 Willcox was unsuccessful in a suit against the First Baptist Church of Los Angeles to recover design fees for a design submitted the previous year; shortly thereafter he relocated to San Francisco; from San Francisco he designed the public library for Reno, Nevada, in 1904. After 1907, Willcox may have reduced his activities as an architect and practiced primarily as a surveyor. He retired from practice in San Francisco shortly before World War I.

Willcox was living at a Veterans Home of California Yountville in Yountville, California, when he died in 1929, shortly before his 97th birthday.
