= Dr. Ward Beebe House =

Historic house in Minnesota, United States

- U.S. National Register of Historic Places
- U.S. Historic district – Contributing property
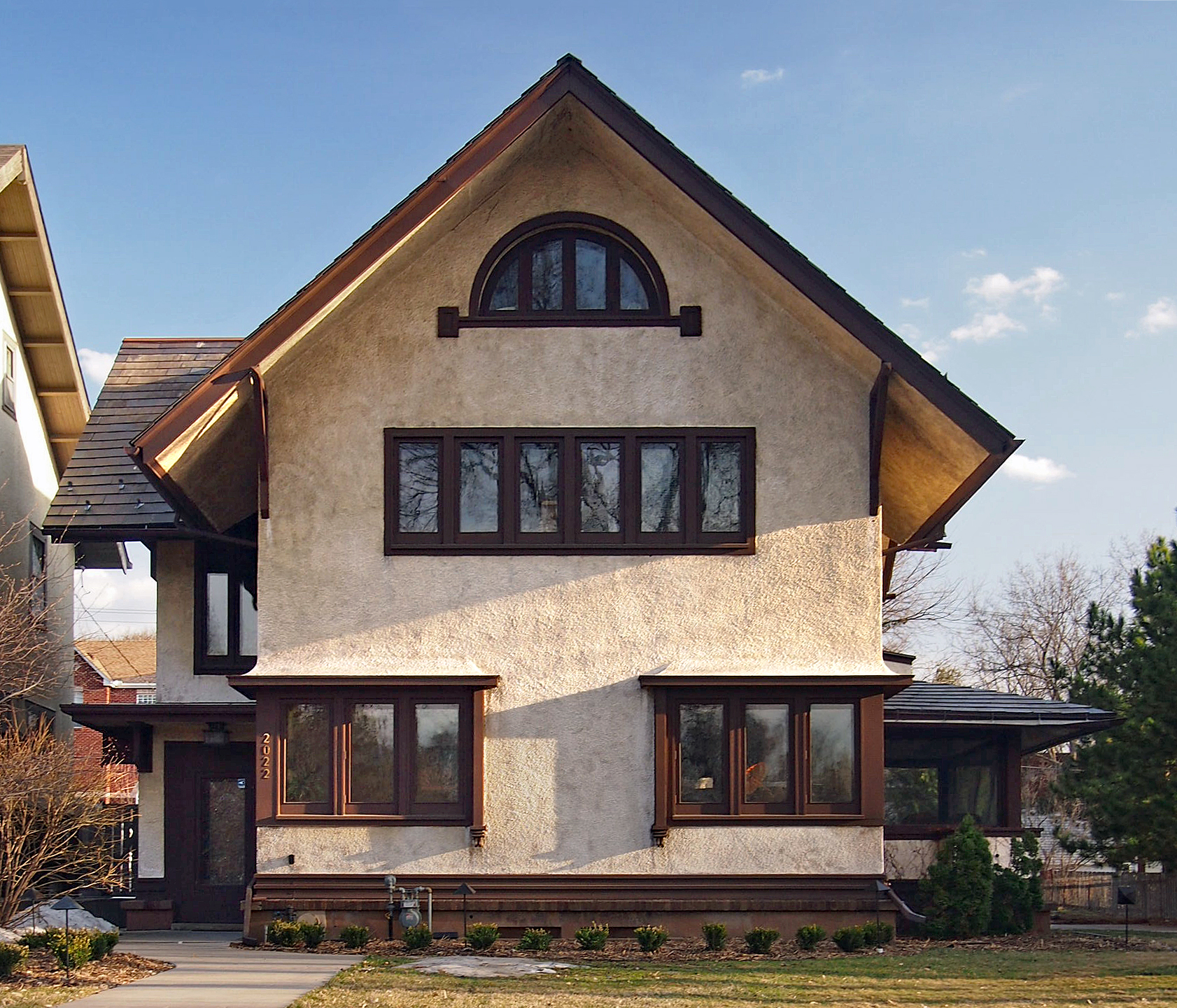
- The Dr. Ward Beebe House from the north

- Location within Minnesota Location within the United States
- Location: 2022 Summit Avenue; Saint Paul, Minnesota
- Coordinates: 44°56′28″N 93°11′9″W
- Built: 1912
- Architect: William Gray Purcell and George G. Elmslie
- Architectural style: Prairie School
- Part of: West Summit Avenue Historic District (ID93000332)
- NRHP reference No.: 77000762
- Added to NRHP: August 29, 1977

The Dr. Ward Beebe House, also known as the John Leuthold Residence, is a three-story stucco prairie house built by Dr. Ward and Bess Beebe and designed by Purcell and Elmslie in 1912. Purcell and Elmslie were prolific designers of prairie style homes. It is located in the West Summit Avenue Historic District, in Saint Paul, Minnesota, United States.

The house was built for the Beebes as a wedding present from Bess Beebe's parents. The Beebe house is Purcell and Elmslie's only house in Saint Paul, and includes elements from English Arts and Crafts design as well as the Prairie Style. Purcell and Elmslie designed the primary rooms to emphasize views of Summit Avenue. Purcell was quoted as saying, "At the time... it was one of the most talked about residential streets in America, broad and with beautiful trees; the views up and down the street were valued. So the unusual corner windows looking both ways from the living room were accepted as a fine response toward a choice and expensive location." The house has a large cross-gabled roof with deep eaves, giving it a broader look than its narrow structure would otherwise indicate.

On the interior, the living room and the dining room are centered around a hearth and have no walls between them, similar to the Dr. Oscar Owre House in Minneapolis. The firm preferred to avoid building walls in first-floor living areas so they could increase the sense of space. The second floor has three bedrooms, a bathroom, and a tiny library sitting room with bay windows and a window seat. Elmslie also designed detailed art glass insets for the bookcases near the entrance.
