= Kimball, Minnesota =

City in Minnesota, United States

Kimball
- City
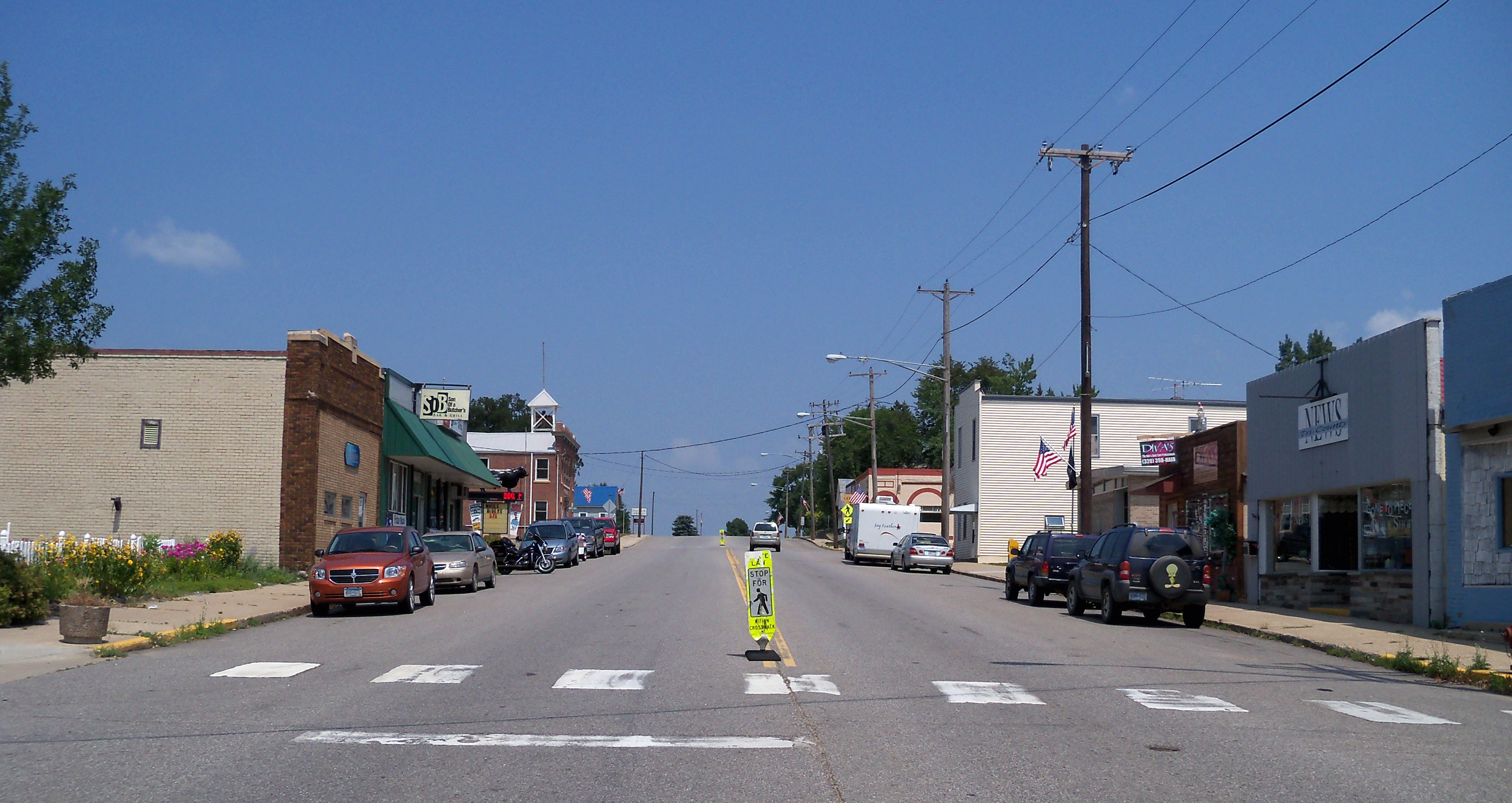
- Downtown Kimball

- Location of Kimball within Stearns County, Minnesota
- Coordinates: 45°18′52″N 94°18′03″W
- Country: United States
- State: Minnesota
- County: Stearns

Area
  - Total: 1.51 sq mi (3.92 km^{2})
  - Land: 1.51 sq mi (3.92 km^{2})
  - Water: 0 sq mi (0.00 km^{2})
- Elevation: 1,165 ft (355 m)

Population (2020)
  - Total: 799
  - Density: 528.5/sq mi (204.05/km^{2})
- Time zone: UTC-6 (CST)
  - Summer (DST): UTC-5 (CDT)
- ZIP code: 55353
- Area code: 320
- FIPS code: 27-33164
- GNIS feature ID: 2395529
- Website: ci.kimball.mn.us

Kimball (/ˈkɪmbəl/ KIM-bəl) is a city in Stearns County, Minnesota, United States. The population was 799 at the 2020 census. It is part of the St. Cloud Metropolitan Statistical Area.

== History ==
A post office called Kimball has been in operation since 1887. The settlement of Maine Prairie moved when the railroad came though Kimball. The city was named for Frye Kimball, an early settler. Kimball has one property listed on the National Register of Historic Places: the 1908 Kimball City Hall.

== Geography ==
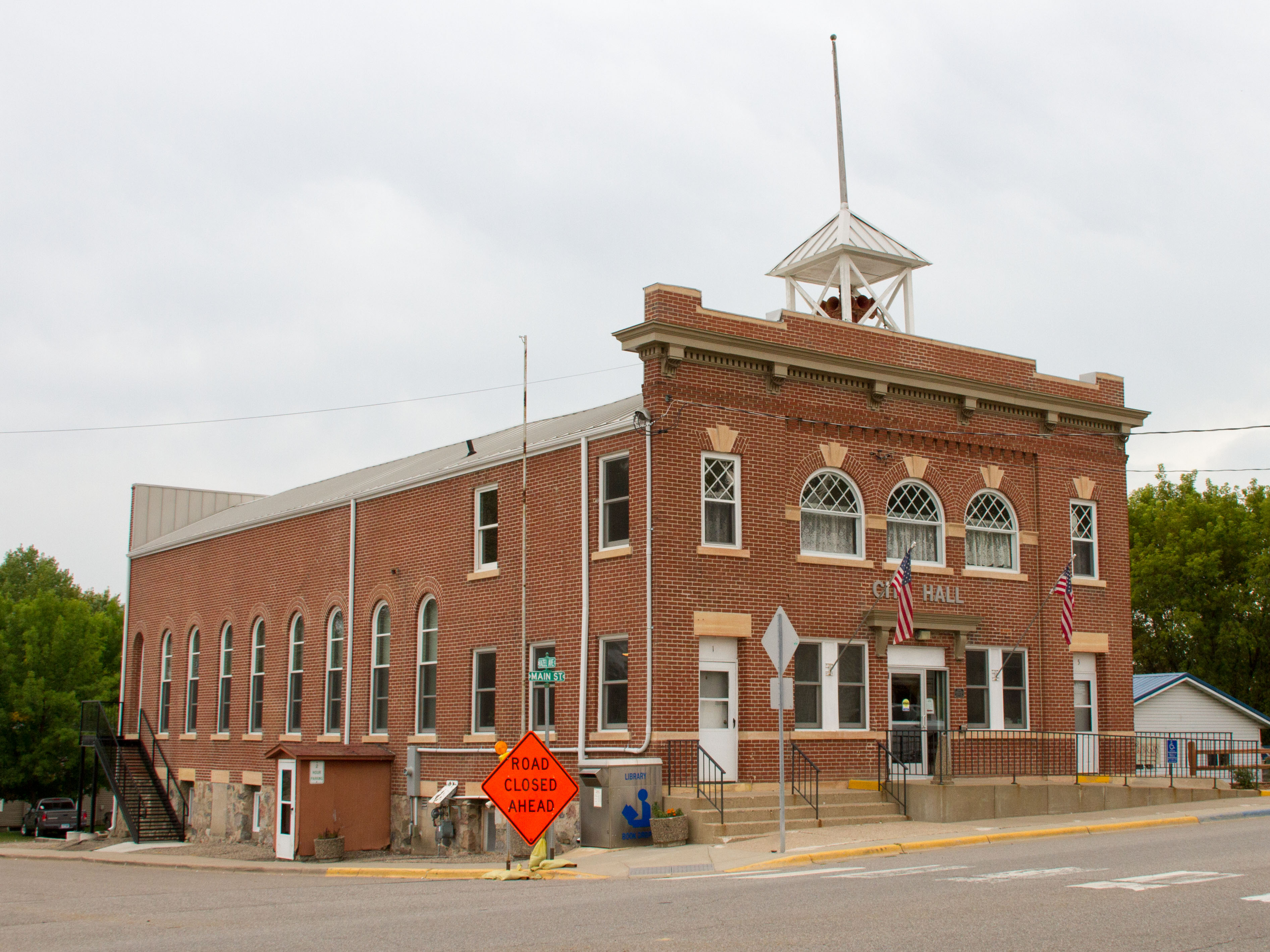
Kimball Prairie Village Hall is listed on the National Register of Historic Places.

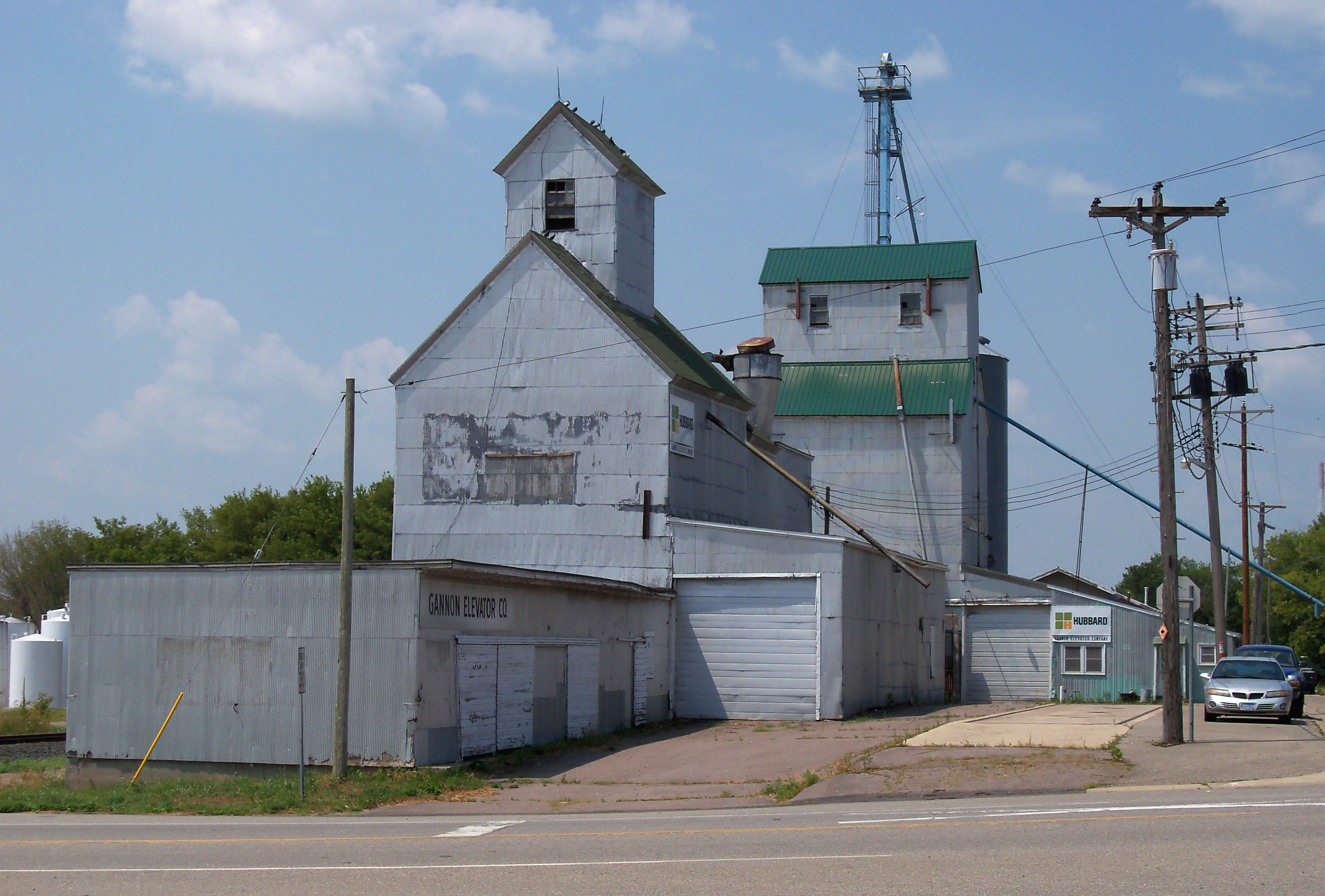
Kimball grain elevator.

According to the United States Census Bureau, the city has an area of 1.51 square miles (3.91 km^{2}), all land.

Minnesota State Highways 15, 24, and 55 are the main routes in the community.

== Demographics ==
Historical population
| Census | Pop. | Note | %± |
|---|---|---|---|
| 1900 | 327 | | — |
| 1910 | 812 | | 148.3% |
| 1920 | 445 | | −45.2% |
| 1930 | 495 | | 11.2% |
| 1940 | 505 | | 2.0% |
| 1950 | 479 | | −5.1% |
| 1960 | 535 | | 11.7% |
| 1970 | 567 | | 6.0% |
| 1980 | 651 | | 14.8% |
| 1990 | 690 | | 6.0% |
| 2000 | 635 | | −8.0% |
| 2010 | 762 | | 20.0% |
| 2020 | 799 | | 4.9% |
U.S. Decennial Census; 2020 Census

=== 2010 census ===
As of the census of 2010, there were 762 people, 310 households, and 191 families living in the city. The population density was 504.6 inhabitants per square mile (194.8/km^{2}). There were 336 housing units at an average density of 222.5 per square mile (85.9/km^{2}). The racial makeup of the city was 96.9% White, 0.5% African American, 0.1% Native American, 0.3% Asian, 0.3% from other races, and 2.0% from two or more races. Hispanic or Latino of any race were 1.0% of the population.

There were 310 households, of which 34.2% had children under the age of 18 living with them, 49.7% were married couples living together, 7.7% had a female householder with no husband present, 4.2% had a male householder with no wife present, and 38.4% were non-families. 30.3% of all households were made up of individuals, and 11.9% had someone living alone who was 65 years of age or older. The average household size was 2.40 and the average family size was 3.04.

The median age in the city was 32.2 years. 25.9% of residents were under the age of 18; 9.2% were between the ages of 18 and 24; 31.4% were from 25 to 44; 17.5% were from 45 to 64; and 16% were 65 years of age or older. The gender makeup of the city was 48.4% male and 51.6% female.

=== 2000 census ===
As of the census of 2000, there were 635 people, 262 households, and 165 families living in the city. The population density was 459.0 inhabitants per square mile (177.2/km^{2}). There were 280 housing units at an average density of 202.4 per square mile (78.1/km^{2}). The racial makeup of the city was 97.64% White, 0.16% African American, 0.63% Native American, 0.94% Asian, and 0.63% from two or more races. Hispanic or Latino of any race were 1.57% of the population. 53.5% were of German, 9.0% Irish, 7.6% Swedish and 6.1% Norwegian ancestry according to Census 2000.

There were 262 households, out of which 30.5% had children under the age of 18 living with them, 45.0% were married couples living together, 10.3% had a female householder with no husband present, and 37.0% were non-families. 31.7% of all households were made up of individuals, and 17.2% had someone living alone who was 65 years of age or older. The average household size was 2.39 and the average family size was 3.01

In the city, the population was spread out, with 26.9% under the age of 18, 10.6% from 18 to 24, 27.6% from 25 to 44, 18.6% from 45 to 64, and 16.4% who were 65 years of age or older. The median age was 33 years. For every 100 females, there were 89.0 males. For every 100 females age 18 and over, there were 87.9 males.

The median income for a household in the city was $34,219, and the median income for a family was $40,455. Males had a median income of $28,125 versus $21,875 for females. The per capita income for the city was $16,971. About 5.9% of families and 9.1% of the population were below the poverty line, including 8.6% of those under age 18 and 14.4% of those age 65 or over.
