= Summit Avenue (St. Paul) =

Street in Minnesota, United States

Coordinates: 44°56′28.9″N 93°8′47.6″W

- Historic Hill District
- U.S. National Register of Historic Places
- U.S. Historic district
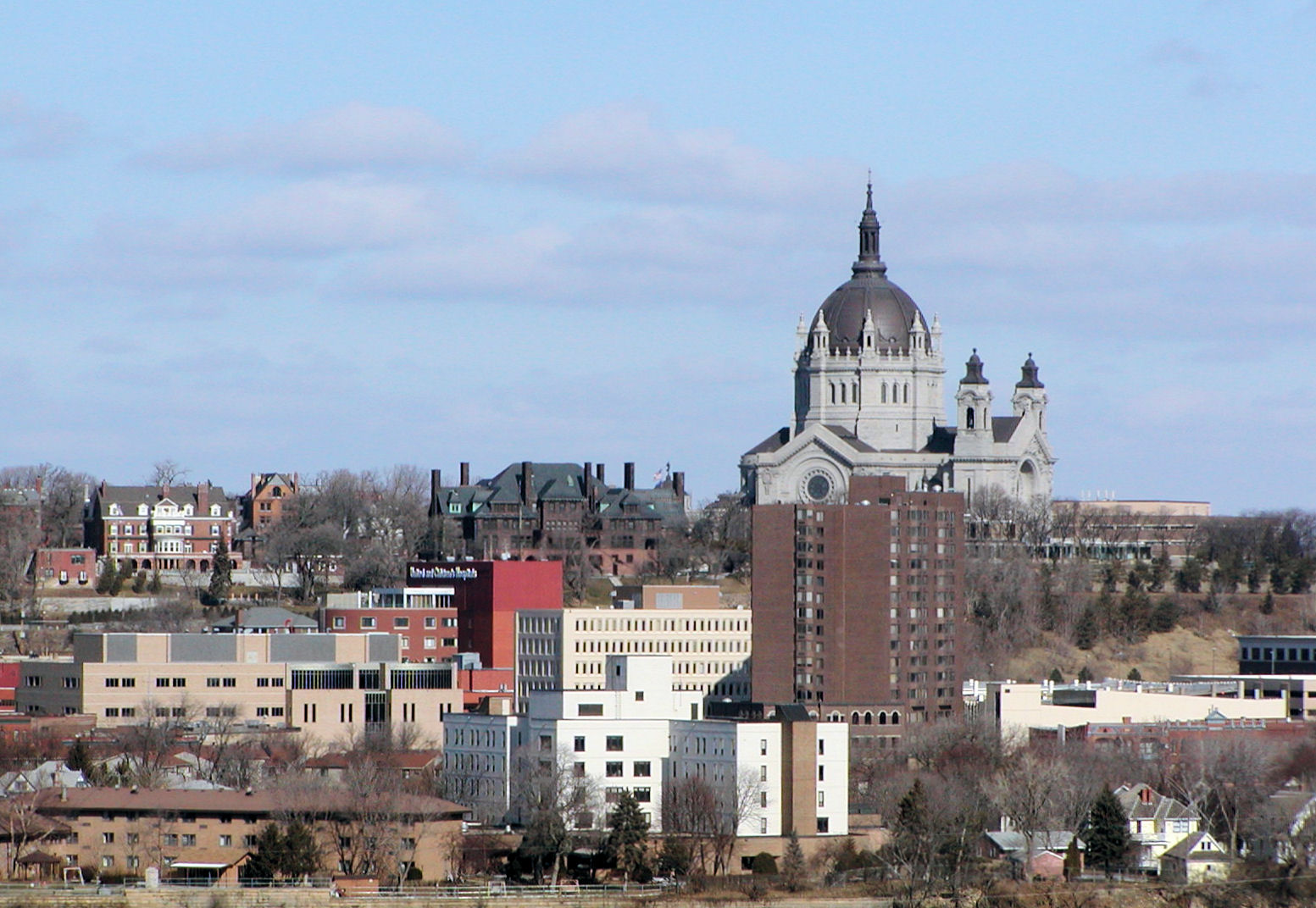
- The Cathedral of Saint Paul overshadows mansions on east Summit Avenue

- Location within Minnesota Location within the United States
- Location: Irregular pattern from Pleasant and Grand Aves. to Holly and Marshall Aves., from Lexington Pkwy. to 4th and Pleasant in St. Paul, Minnesota
- Built: 1860
- Architect: Multiple
- Architectural style: Late 19th and 20th Century Revivals, Late Victorian
- NRHP reference No.: 76001067
- Added to NRHP: August 13, 1976

- West Summit Avenue Historic District
- U.S. National Register of Historic Places
- U.S. Historic district
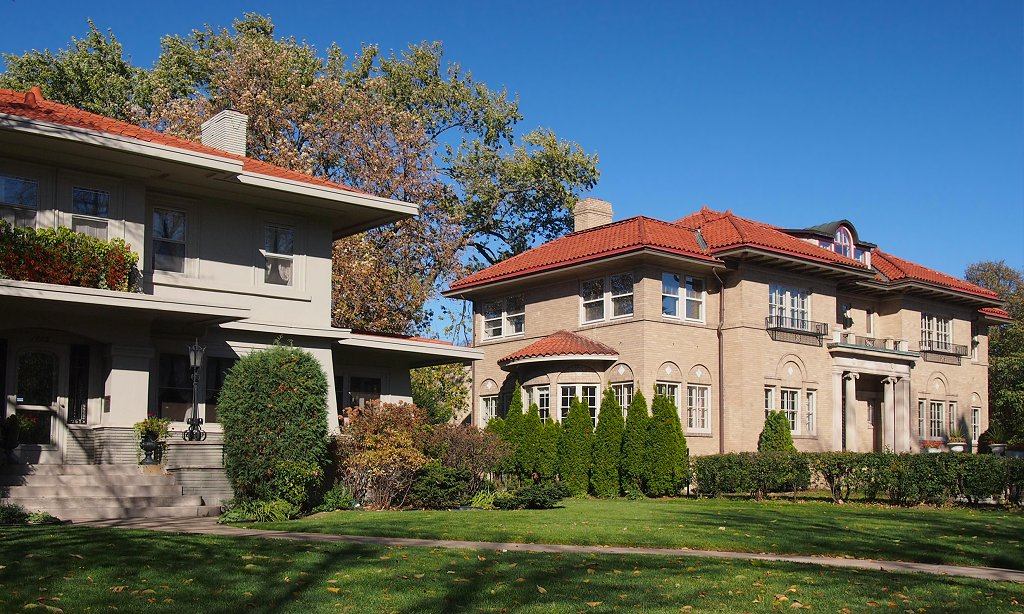
- Homes on West Summit Avenue
- Location: Summit Avenue between Lexington Parkway and Mississippi River Boulevard in Saint Paul, Minnesota
- Built: 1887
- Architect: Multiple
- Architectural style: Colonial Revival, Classical Revival, Bungalow/Craftsman Queen Anne Romanesque Revival Beaux-Arts Tudor Revival
- NRHP reference No.: 93000332
- Added to NRHP: May 4, 1993

Summit Avenue is a street in Saint Paul, Minnesota, United States, known for being the longest avenue of Victorian homes in the country, with many historic houses, churches, synagogues, schools, and universities. The street starts just west of downtown Saint Paul and continues four and a half miles west to the Mississippi River, where Saint Paul meets Minneapolis. Other cities have similar streets, such as Prairie Avenue in Chicago, Euclid Avenue in Cleveland, and Fifth Avenue in New York City. Summit Avenue is notable for having preserved its historic character and mix of buildings. Historian Ernest R. Sandeen called it "the best preserved example of the Victorian monumental residential boulevard."

Summit Avenue is part of two National Historic Districts and two City of Saint Paul Heritage Preservation Districts. The National Historic Districts are the Historic Hill District, an irregular area roughly bounded by Lexington Avenue, Portland Avenue, Dale Street North, Marshall Avenue, Pleasant Street, and Grand Avenue (excluding the area within the Woodland Park Historic District), and the West Summit Avenue Historic District, a narrow area running from Oxford Street southwest to the Mississippi River along Summit Avenue. The city districts are Summit Hill, also known as Crocus Hill, a triangular region from Lexington Avenue on the west, Summit Avenue on the north, and the bluffs (just north of Interstate Highway 35E) on the south, and Ramsey Hill, the area bounded by Summit Avenue, Dale Street, Interstate Highway 94, and a line running north from the Cathedral of Saint Paul. Most of the houses in this district are large, distinctive edifices built between 1890 and 1920.

Summit Avenue was named one of 10 "great streets" nationally by the American Planning Association in 2008.

== History ==
The history of Summit Avenue dates to the early 1850s, when Saint Paul was in its infancy. Mansions started to appear atop the hill in the city's earliest days. An 1859 photograph by Joel Whitney shows six houses on the hill. Edward Duffield Neill owned the first house on Summit Avenue, where the James J. Hill House now stands. Continuing westward, the photo shows the houses of William and Angelina Noble, Henry F. Masterson, Henry Mower Rice, Henry Neill Paul, and David Stuart. The Stuart House, at 312 Summit Avenue, is the only one of these still standing, making it the oldest remaining house on Summit Avenue and one of the oldest in Saint Paul.

Development was slow during the American Civil War and afterward, but the district began to grow in the 1880s. City water service was provided in 1884, and a cable car line built on Selby Avenue in 1887 provided improved access to downtown. In 1890, the city's first streetcars began operating on Grand Avenue, just south of Summit, and the Hill District became a fashionable place to live.

The district began to decline in the 1930s as many old mansions either turned into rooming-houses or went vacant. The housing stock was not decimated by commercial development pressure, as the bluffs separating the Summit Avenue area from downtown Saint Paul made it difficult for downtown to expand into the area. In 1959, the Amherst H. Wilder mansion was torn down, marking the last major house to be torn down.

The area began to turn around in the 1960s and 1970s, as young couples discovered that the Victorian homes were affordable and could be restored. Neighborhood associations also formed and helped with preservation efforts.

Summit Avenue originally began at North Robert Street but much of Summit Avenue in the Capitol Heights area was removed with the expansion of the State Capitol Mall and the construction of Interstate 94. The remaining section of Summit Avenue in that area between Cedar Street and North Robert Street was first renamed Thirteenth Street and in 1953 renamed Columbus Street.

== Architecture ==
The earliest residences on Summit Avenue were primarily constructed in a style commonly called the “Italian Villa”. The “Italian Villa” or “Italianate” style was popular in the 1860s and 1870s and was part of the picturesque movement, which rebelled against the wide usage of classical forms in architecture. Italianate buildings in particular were largely inspired by medieval farmhouses in the Italian countryside. Residences in this style are usually characterized by low-pitched roofs often topped with cupolas, eaves decorated by brackets, and round-headed windows with decorative moldings. Most Italianate buildings also feature a square tower and are irregular and asymmetrical in shape. The earliest residence constructed on the bluff overlooking Saint Paul was the house of Edward Duffield Neill. It was razed in 1886, but surviving photographs show that the bracketed limestone house was built in this style. Another early house, the 1863 Emerson House at 378 Summit, was also built in this style and its facade was quite similar to that of the Neill House, with limestone walls and fashionably ornate window hoods. A house originally constructed in 1875, the Cutler House at 360 Summit, was originally constructed in the Italian Villa style and photographs show that it featured brick-veneered walls, a three-story tower, and a mansard roof. Ten years later this style was no longer fashionable and the house was updated to adhere more to the then-popular Queen Anne style. Six feet were added to three sides of the houses and the roofline was completely changed so that the remodeled house was completely unrecognizable from its original Italian Villa design. Perhaps the most characteristic example of Italianate architecture on Summit Avenue is the 1863 Burbank–Livingston–Griggs House, with its distinctive arched bay windows, bracketed cornice, and glass-enclosed cupola on the roof.

Another popular style in the early years was the opulent Second Empire style, which derives its name from the reign of Napoleon III of France (1852-1870). This style, based on Parisian buildings, is very similar to the Italianate but with a distinctly different roof style. This most defining characteristic was the pyramidal mansard roof, inspired by those of 17th-century French architect François Mansart. Summit Avenue once had a very fine Second Empire style home, the Kittson Mansion, which occupied the spot of the current Cathedral of Saint Paul. Before the construction of the James J. Hill House in 1891, this was the grandest house in Minnesota and was exemplary of the Second Empire style with its opulent details such as scrollwork, stained-glass windows, and mansard-roofed tower.

After the Italianate style, the next style to become widespread on Summit Avenue was the Queen Anne style. Its name is misleading as it bears no real resemblance to early 18th-century British architecture. Instead, this style is fantastical, featuring columns and pediments, peaked, high-pitched roofs, and profuse decorative elements such as dormer windows, gables, bays, porches, balconies, and turrets. In addition, this style almost always includes a wraparound porch and either a round or polygonal corner tower coming out of the spire-like roof. Such houses were constructed using materials such as stone, slate, brick, wood, shingles, and half-timbering. Summit Avenue’s lost 1882 Barnum House once exhibited a transition from Italianate style to Queen Anne. It had characteristics of both styles such as typically Italianate porch detailing, windows and bracketing but also a roof, balconies, and turrets that adhered more to the newer style. Summit Avenue contains many houses built in the purely Queen Anne style such as the castle-like red brick Driscoll House with its conical turret and high-pitched roof spotted with many dormers and chimneys. The wooden “fairytale” residence at 513 Summit was also constructed in this style and features a large porch and a fanciful turret. One of the best-preserved Queen Anne Style houses on the Avenue is the Shipman-Greve House at 445 Summit. This unique limestone house exhibits half-timbering and decorative Japanese-inspired latticework on the porch. A variant of the Queen Anne style commonly known as the “Shingle Style” can be seen in Summit’s 1884 Noyes House. The Shingle Style is similar to the Queen Anne but constructed with wood shingling on every surface, giving these buildings an irregular texture.

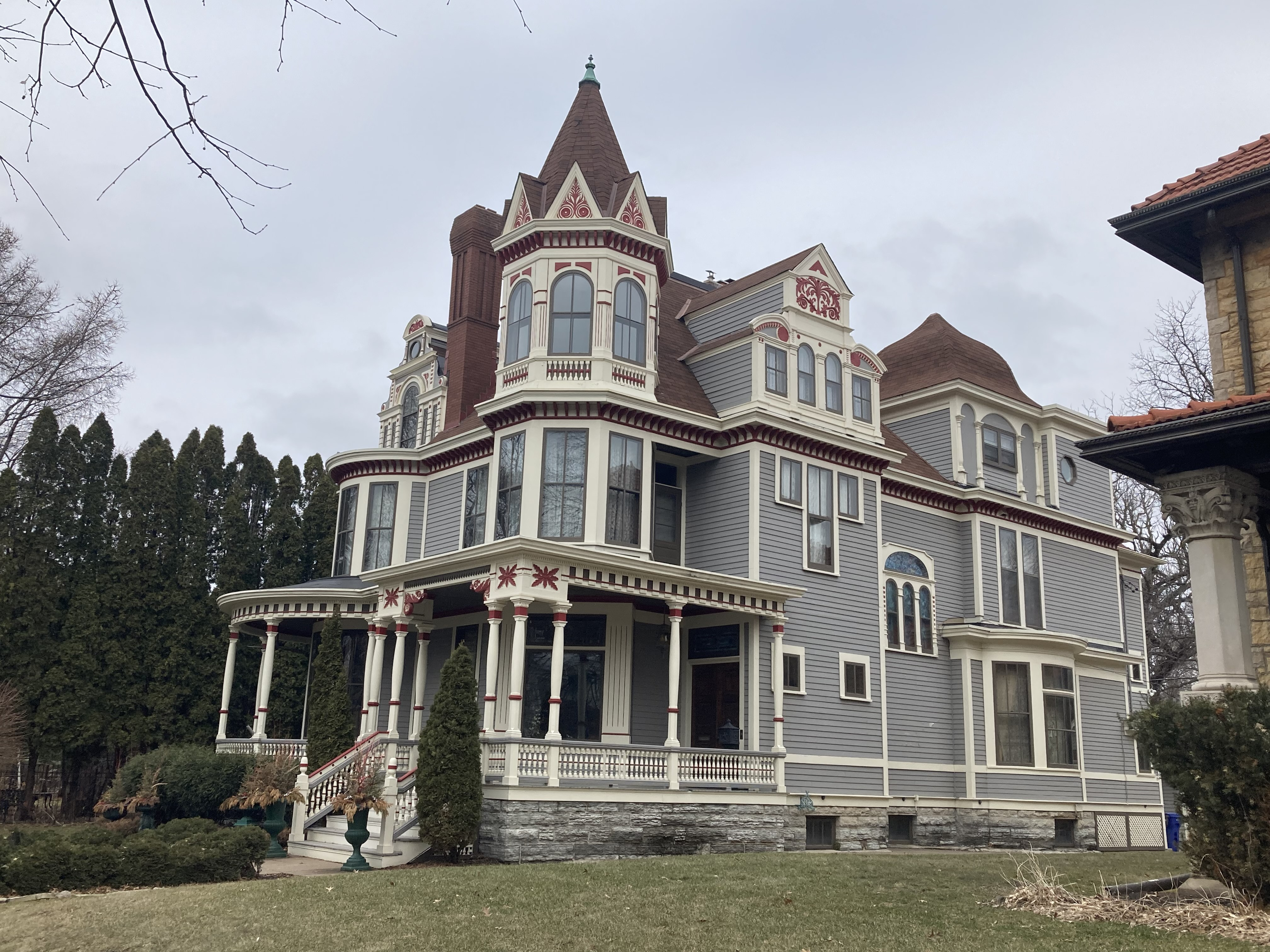
The Bishop mansion at 513 Summit is a fine example of the Queen Anne architectural style on Summit Avenue

Another popular style of architecture on Summit Avenue was the “Romanesque Revival”. This style was characterized by powerful medieval design motifs, particularly inspired by those of the Romanesque period (800-1150). Such medieval-inspired elements often include corner towers, steeply pitched roofs, and heavy arches around doorways and windows, making these buildings often resemble a medieval fortress. Buildings in this style were always built in brick or stone, usually roughly finished, and massive in construction. The largest and best-known house on Summit Avenue, the James J. Hill House, is in this style. It was built in 1891 for railroad businessman James J. Hill, who was key in the development of the American Northwest. Its architecture reflects the distinctive work of architect Henry Hobson Richardson, whose style, though historically inspired, was very versatile and stressed utilitarianism, coherence, and greater simplicity. Many common features of this uniquely American Richardsonian Romanesque are featured in the Hill House such as rough red sandstone masonry, heavy round arches, and a slate roof, all built on a massive scale. But the Hill House also exhibits more delicate elements, such as its skylights and Tiffany stained-glass windows, showing an interesting contrast. The Wilder Mansion that once stood at 226 Summit could similarly be classified as Romanesque Revival in style but it did not resemble the Hill House. It was much more in keeping with the picturesque movement and adhered more to historic European styles than American utilitarianism. The Lightner House at 318 Summit is more similar to the Hill House, with features such as large blocks of rough stone and a strong entrance arch that reflect the distinctive buildings of Richardson. The 1887 Rugg House is also Romanesque but not quite so simple with its horizontal dark-colored brickwork, peaked tile roof, and entrance arch decorated with carved sculptures.

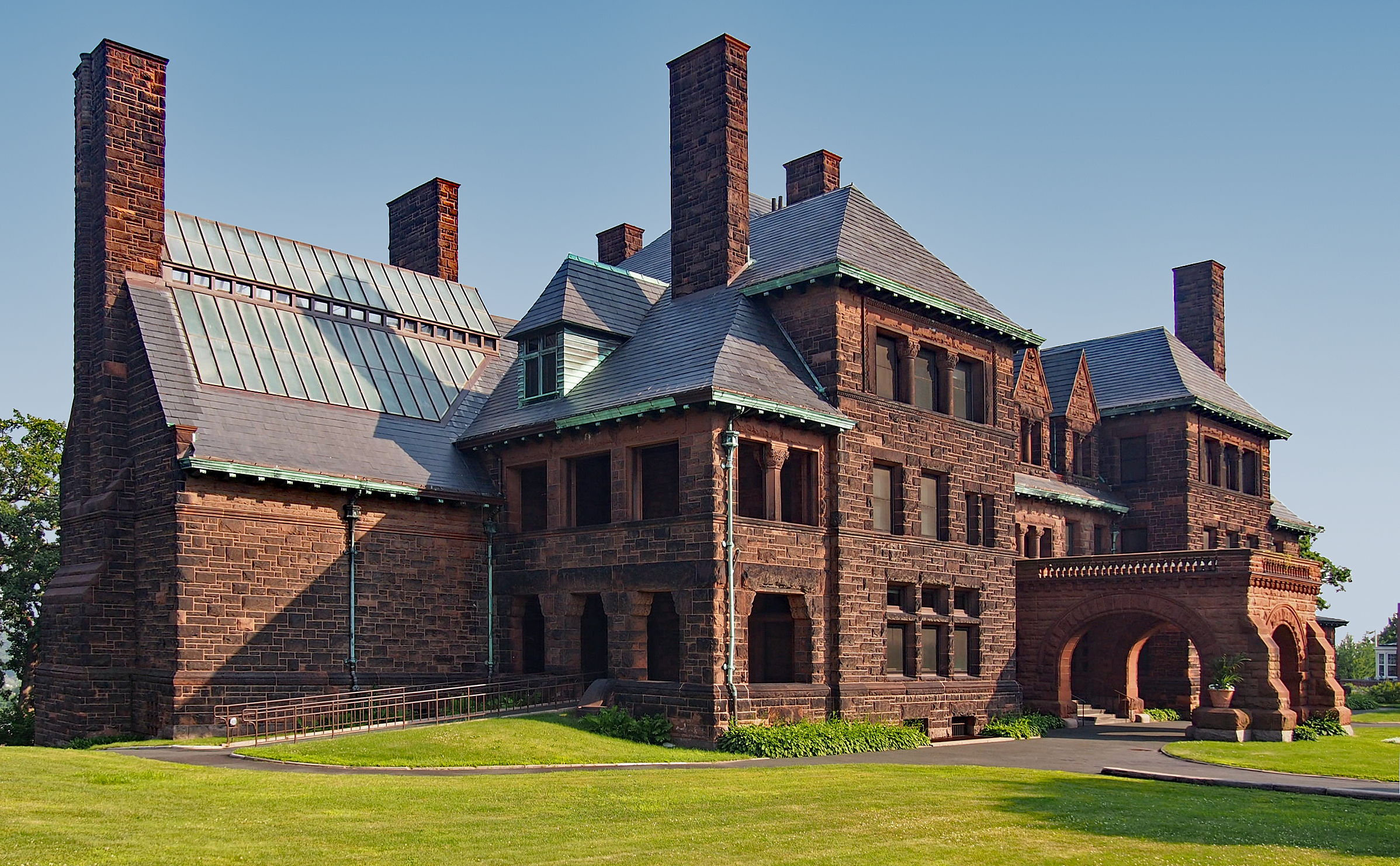
James J. Hill House 2013

Those who built homes on Summit Avenue at the turn of the century wanted to exude a certain sense of culture, and employed the Beaux-Arts style based on an appreciation of European architecture. On Summit Avenue the most popular form was the Italian Renaissance palazzo style, like the 1894 Scott residence at 340 Summit, which resembles a Renaissance palace. Another example of the Beaux-Arts style on Summit Avenue is the Davidson House at 344 Summit, which features a design based on Elizabethan English manor houses. Notably, instead of merely copying a 16th-century building, the European tradition has been adapted in this case to suit a modern construction. Perhaps the most prominent example of the Beaux-Arts style on Summit Avenue is not a house but the Cathedral of Saint Paul. The Cathedral stands at one end of the Avenue, near the Hill House, and was designed by Emmanuel Louis Masqueray, a former student at the École des Beaux-Arts. Its design was modeled on the baroque St. Peter's Basilica in Vatican City and follows the traditional Greek Cross floor plan with many baroque-inspired flourishes. Its most distinctive characteristic is its 306.5-foot dome, inspired by those of Donato Bramante and Michelangelo.

In addition to houses inspired by classical and medieval buildings, Summit Avenue also featured residences that drew on historically English styles such as the Georgian and Tudor. Summit’s Georgian revival houses drew on inspiration from 18th-century English architecture and were characterized by red brick two-story symmetrical facades, with equal numbers of windows on each side and flat roofs decorated with balustrades. One example of the Georgian style is the Boeckman House at 366 Summit, which features eight decorated chimneys, decorative cornices, a steeply pitched slate roof, and an entrance pavilion with a segmental arch. Another residence that reflects this style is the former house of James J. Hill’s son, Louis Hill. It is distinguished by a classical style portico on its front facade with Ionic columns and decorative carvings reminiscent of neoclassicism. On Summit Avenue the houses constructed in the Tudor style were not simply replicas of historical buildings but instead modern buildings featuring Tudor elements. These often included decorative half-timbering, gables, prominent chimneys, patterned brickwork, and medieval-inspired steeply pitched roofs. One of the first houses to be built in the Tudor Villa style on Summit Avenue was the 1909 Lindeke House at 345 Summit. It is notable for having a brick first story while the contrasting upper two stories are instead of stucco-and-beam construction. At 807 Summit stands another Tudor-style residence, this one too with unusual brick and half-timbered stories and a distinctively unbalanced facade, in stark contrast to the symmetry of the Georgian tevival.

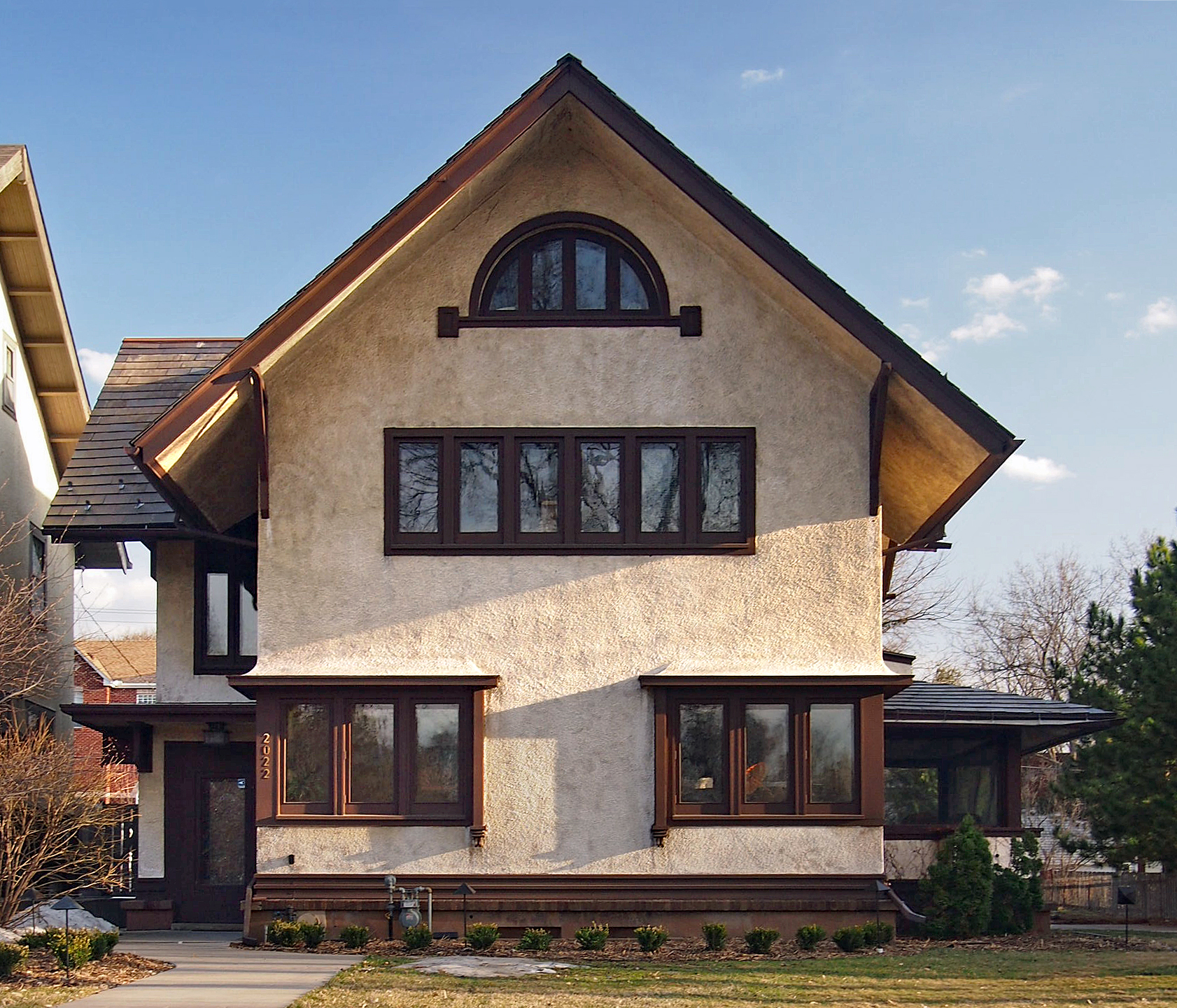
Dr Ward Beebe House 2013

While other houses continued to draw inspiration from history a comparatively more modern style also took root on Summit Avenue, the Rectilinear Style. In this style, the architectural form moves away from previous irregular and fantastical forms and toward a more rectangular shape. Houses of this style often feature elements such as overhanging eaves and casement windows but have little applied ornamentation and are relatively unpretentious. The Dittenhofer house at 705 Summit exhibits a move toward the Rectilinear style in its symmetry and blockish shape but cannot escape historicism in its medieval-inspired elements such as Gothic-like arched windows that were once fitted with stained glass. The 1912 Dr. Ward Beebe House is much simpler and thoroughly unpretentious, looking almost insignificant compared to the other grand houses on the avenue. The Beebe House has no ornamentation but includes extended eaves and windows arranged in banked groups, elements also distinctive of the Prairie School, which was soon to become a variant of the Rectilinear.

== Notable buildings ==
These buildings are listed in numerical address order.

=== National Historic Landmarks ===
Three buildings on or near Summit Avenue are National Historic Landmarks (NHLs).

- James J. Hill House, 240 Summit Avenue
- F. Scott Fitzgerald House, 599 Summit Avenue
- The Frank B. Kellogg House, 633 Fairmount Avenue, is just south of Summit Avenue

=== National Register of Historic Places ===
A number of buildings on Summit Avenue are listed on the National Register of Historic Places (NRHP).

- Cathedral of Saint Paul, 201 Summit Avenue
- Burbank–Livingston–Griggs House, 432 Summit Avenue
- Minnesota Governor's Residence, 1006 Summit Avenue
- Pierce and Walter Butler House, 1345-1347 Summit Avenue
- Dr. Ward Beebe House, 2022 Summit Avenue

=== Other notable buildings ===
Other buildings include:

- University Club of St. Paul, 420 Summit Avenue
- Germanic-American Institute, 301 Summit Avenue
- George F. Lindsay House, 294 Summit Avenue
- Mitchell Hamline School of Law, 875 Summit Avenue
- Macalester College, various buildings between Snelling Avenue and Cambridge Street
- University of St. Thomas, various buildings between Cleveland Avenue and Cretin Avenue
- Saint Paul Seminary, 2260 Summit Avenue
- The Stuart House, 312 Summit Ave
- The Burnquist House, 27 Crocus Place
- Mount Zion Temple, 1300 Summit Avenue
- Cities Church (formerly St. Paul's-on-the-Hill Episcopal Church), 1524 Summit Avenue
- W. W. Bishop House, 513 Summit Ave

== Criticism ==
Frank Lloyd Wright called Summit Avenue "the worst collection of architecture in the world." This was in part due to the imposing scale of the buildings, but mainly because Summit Avenue architecture copied design styles from Europe rather than attempting to find an original American aesthetic.

F. Scott Fitzgerald referred to Summit Avenue as "a mausoleum of American architectural monstrosities".
