= Hmong cuisine =

Culinary traditions of Hmong people

Hmong cuisine comprises the culinary culture of Hmong people, an Asian diaspora originally from China who are present today in countries across the world. Because Hmong people come from all over the world, their cuisine is a fusion of many flavors and histories in East and Southeast Asia, as well as modern diasporas in the Western world such as the United States. Most dishes are not unique to Hmong culture, but are rather served in a Hmong style developed during centuries of migration across cultures.

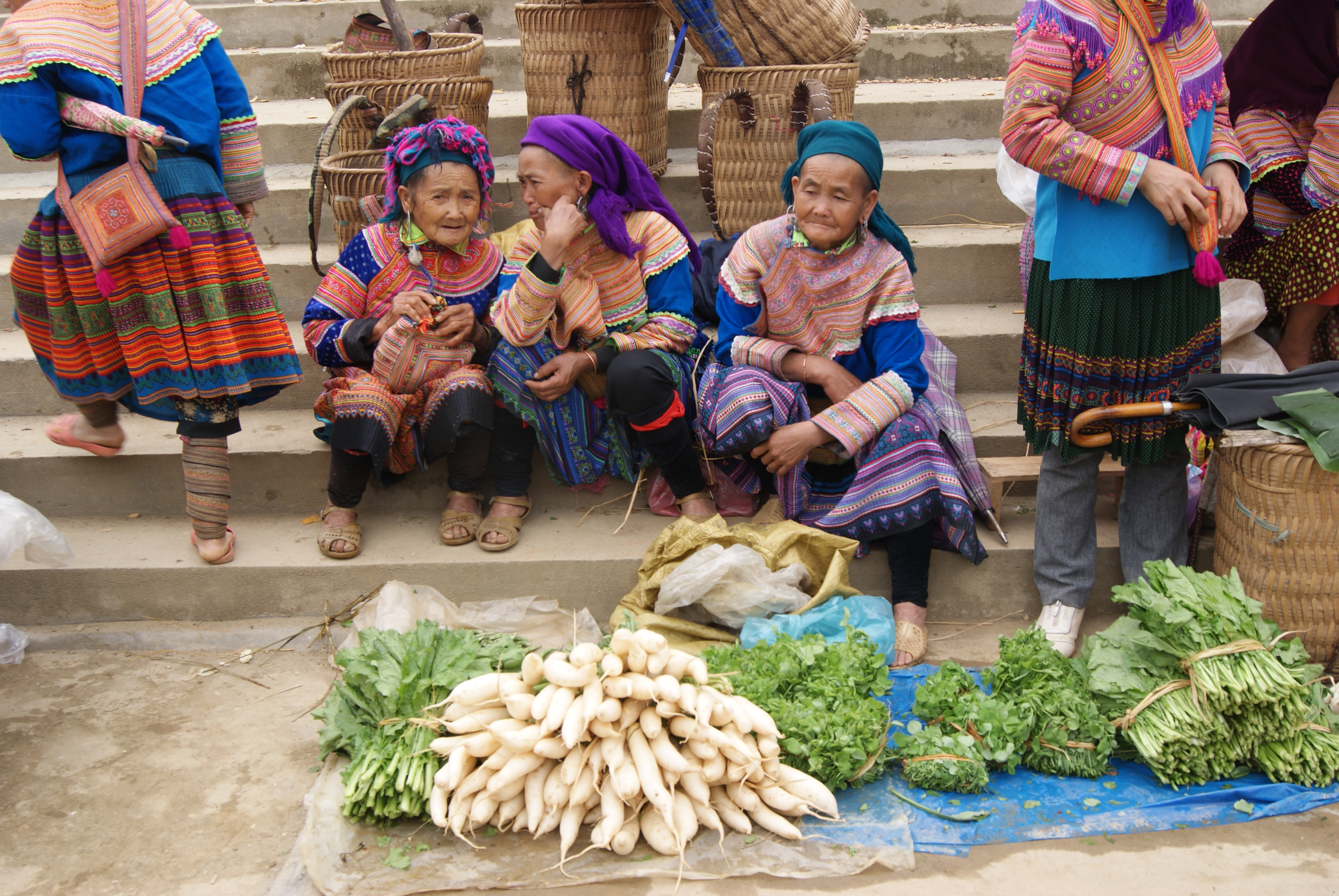
Flower Hmong selling fresh produce at a market in Vietnam

Staple elements include fresh herbs, vegetables such as leafy greens and hot peppers, steamed rice, and small amounts of meat, often chicken meat. Herbs are of major importance as both a food, a flavoring agent, and traditional medicine. Common southeast Asian sauces such as oyster and fish sauce feature prominently, although a fresh sauce called "pepper dip" which is unique to Hmong cuisine is so popular that the first ever Hmong cookbook included 11 variations.

Cooking is traditionally done by steaming or boiling and many dishes are prepared as simple stews or soups. In the modern Hmong diaspora, other forms of cooking such as stir frying have become common. Historically the animal fats and oils required for frying were scarce.

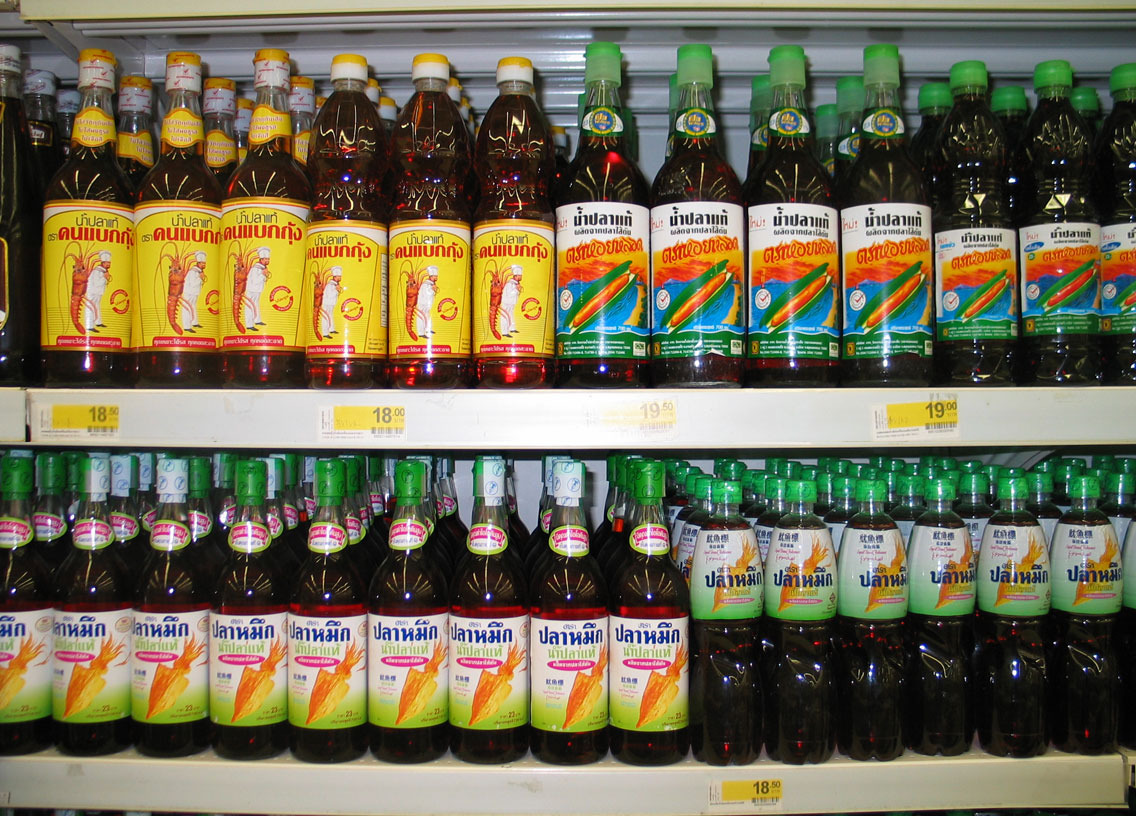
Commercially produced Thai fish sauce

There is an emphasis on fresh ingredients, as many Hmong are farmers and may pick ingredients from a garden just before cooking. Butchering for meat is also done close to the time of cooking. Frugality is a common theme, as many Hmong are from low-income backgrounds, especially Hmong Americans who immigrated from underfunded refugee camps. Prior to the 21st century, Hmong lived mostly in self-sustaining agricultural villages where they raised livestock and grew crops.

== Hmong cuisine as fusion ==
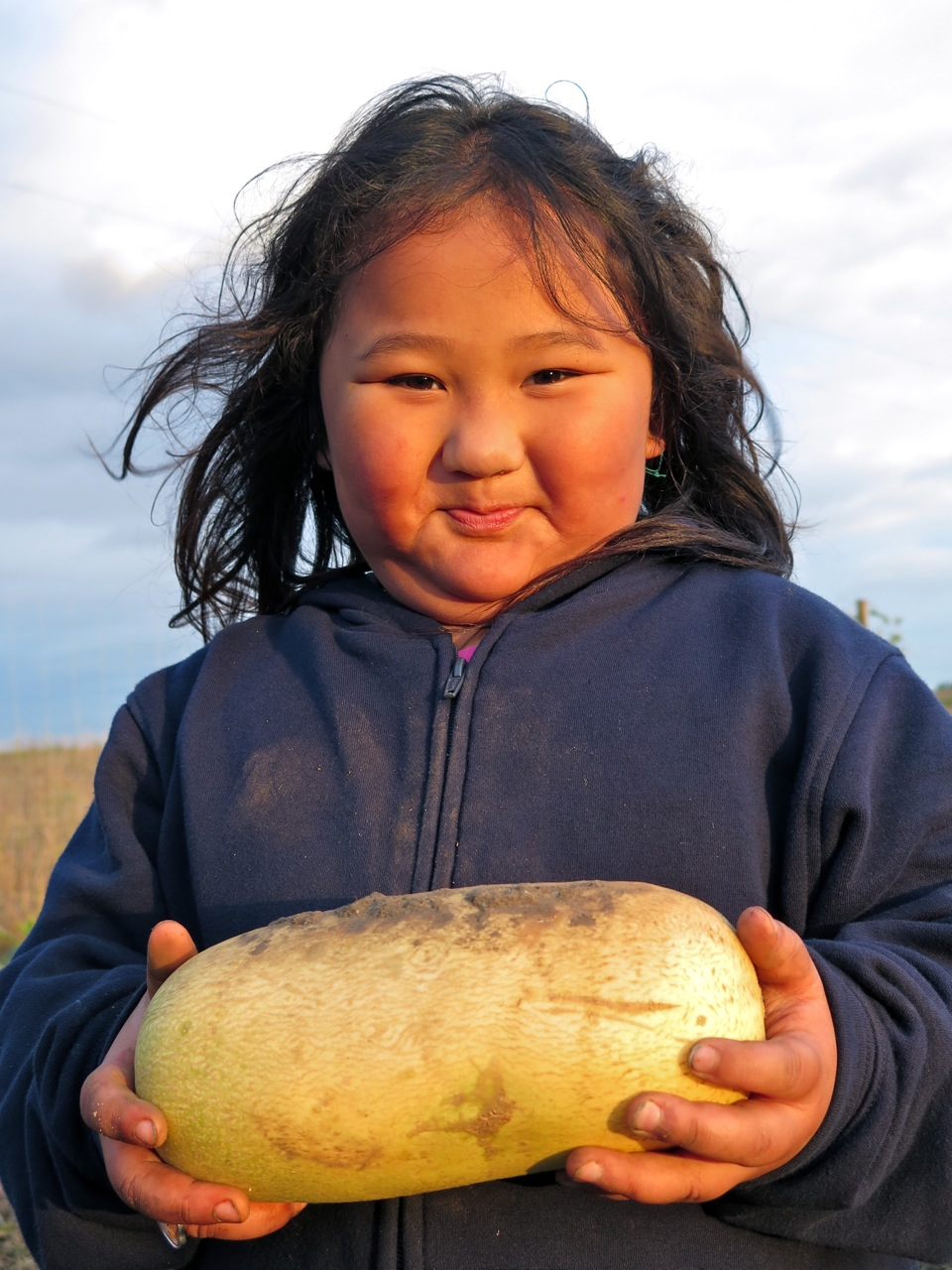
A Hmong girl holding a Hmong yellow cucumber

Co-founder and executive director of the Hmong American Farmers Association Pakou Hang calls Hmong cuisine "the ultimate fusion food". Hmong cuisine is influenced by frequent ancient and modern migration, including through Thailand, Laos, Cambodia, Vietnam, China, Japan, South Korea, and even the United States, Canada, Mexico, and Argentina. Some sources claim Hmong food is closest to Laotian cuisine, but the diversity of Hmong backgrounds complicates the idea of a single origin. For example, some Hmong identify with their country of settlement even among other Hmong, such as Thai Hmong, Lao Hmong, and Hmong American, which greatly influences their cuisine.

Hmong American celebrity chef Yia Vang calls Hmong cuisine a "philosophy" and a way to understand Hmong culture.

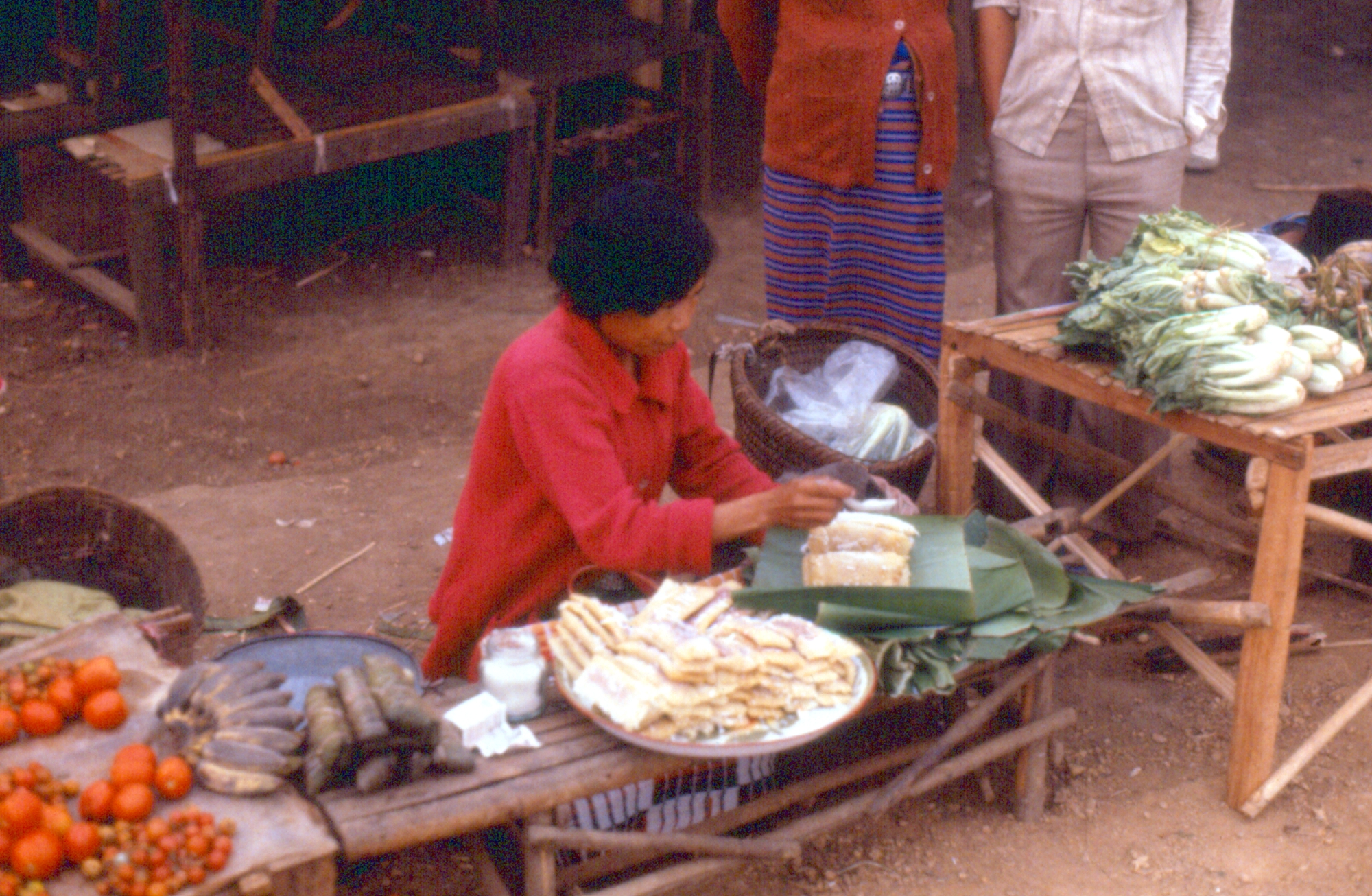
A Hmong woman preparing street food at Ban Vinai Refugee Camp, Thailand

I would tell people that Hmong food is not just a type of food. It’s not about the product. It’s a philosophy. If you want to know Hmong food, you have know our people. Our story is intricately woven into the food that we eat. It’s our culture DNA that's made out of food that we eat. If you want to know our people you have to know our food. By knowing our food, you will know our story. You'll know where we been and it will show the trajectory to where we’re going.

— Chef Yia Vang at Industry Rules Magazine,

Scholars such as Alison Hope Alkon and Kat Vang, writing in The Immigrant-Food Nexus: Borders, Labor, and Identity in North America (2020), call Hmong cuisine translocal: a cuisine rooted in multiple localities and highly informed by ethnic culture and history regardless of state definitions of citizenship. They categorized food from Hmong American survey respondents in four categories: indigenous Hmong dishes, Hmong American dishes, Hmong adaptations of other Southeast Asian dishes, and American food eaten by Hmong people.

== Common Hmong dishes ==
Dishes popular among Hmong people, served in a Hmong style, or unique to Hmong cuisine.

=== Kua txob ntsw (pepper dip) ===
A condiment made with Thai chilis, cilantro, green onion, salt, monosodium glutamate, fish sauce, and lime juice that is served at most meals, and especially to accompany Hmong sausage. The condiment is known by its Hmong name kua txob ntsw, or in English as pepper dip, pepper condiment, hot chili condiment, or simply "pepper".

=== Mov nplaum ntshaav (purple sticky rice) ===
A preparation of glutinous sweet rice and black rice which is a core part of Hmong meals, especially during New Years celebrations. Cooking dilutes the natural dye in black rice, leading to a purple-colored rice dish. In areas where black rice is uncommon, the rice may be dyed with purple cornstalk or purple carrots.

=== Nyhuv ntxwm hmoob (Hmong sausage) ===
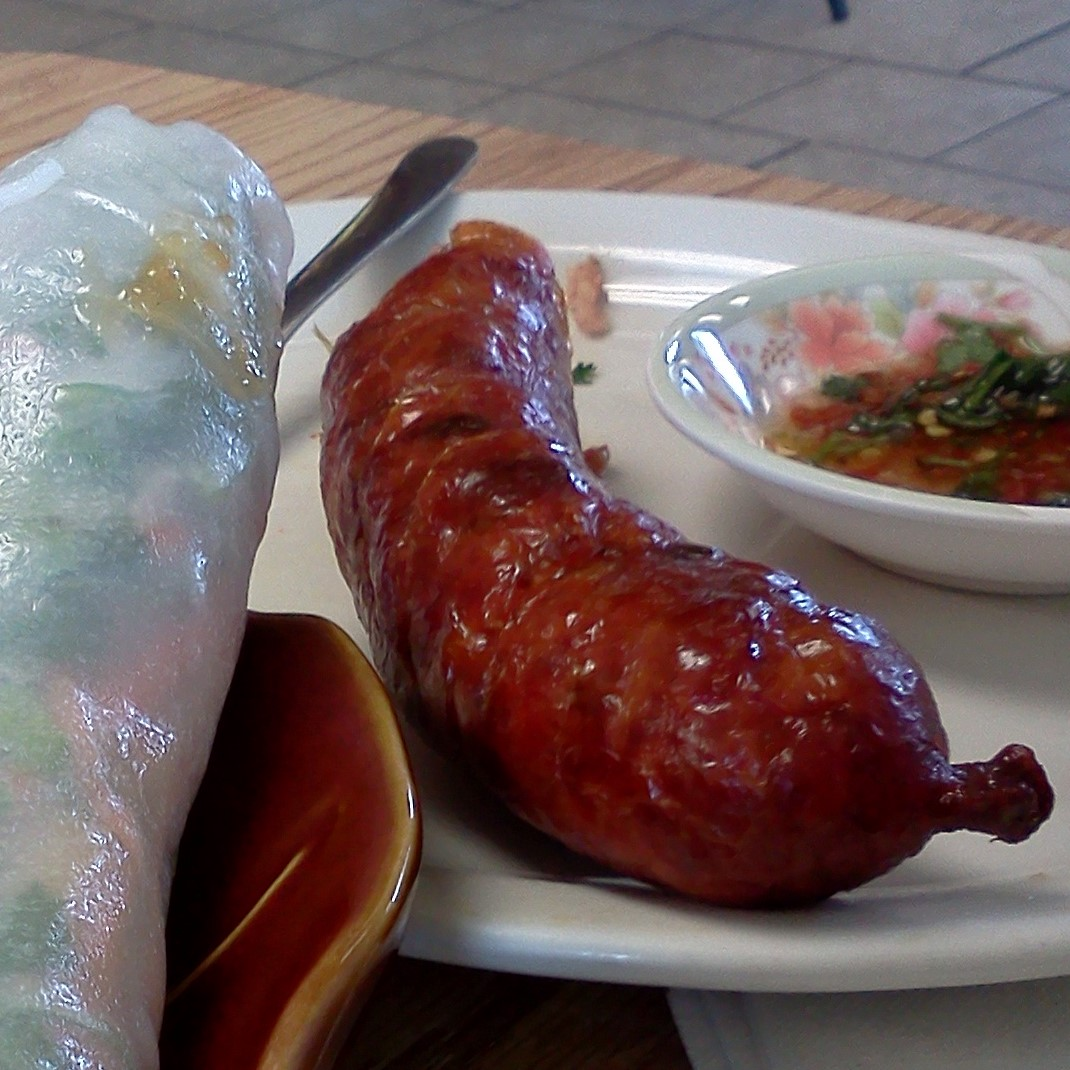
Sausage meal from a Wisconsin Hmong restaurant

A fresh pork sausage seasoned with herbs like lemongrass and Kaffir lime leaf. Usually served with purple sticky rice and pepper dip.

=== nqaij qaib tis (stuffed chicken wings) ===
Deboned chicken wings stuffed with a meat mixture such as from an egg roll.

=== Kab yaub (egg rolls) ===
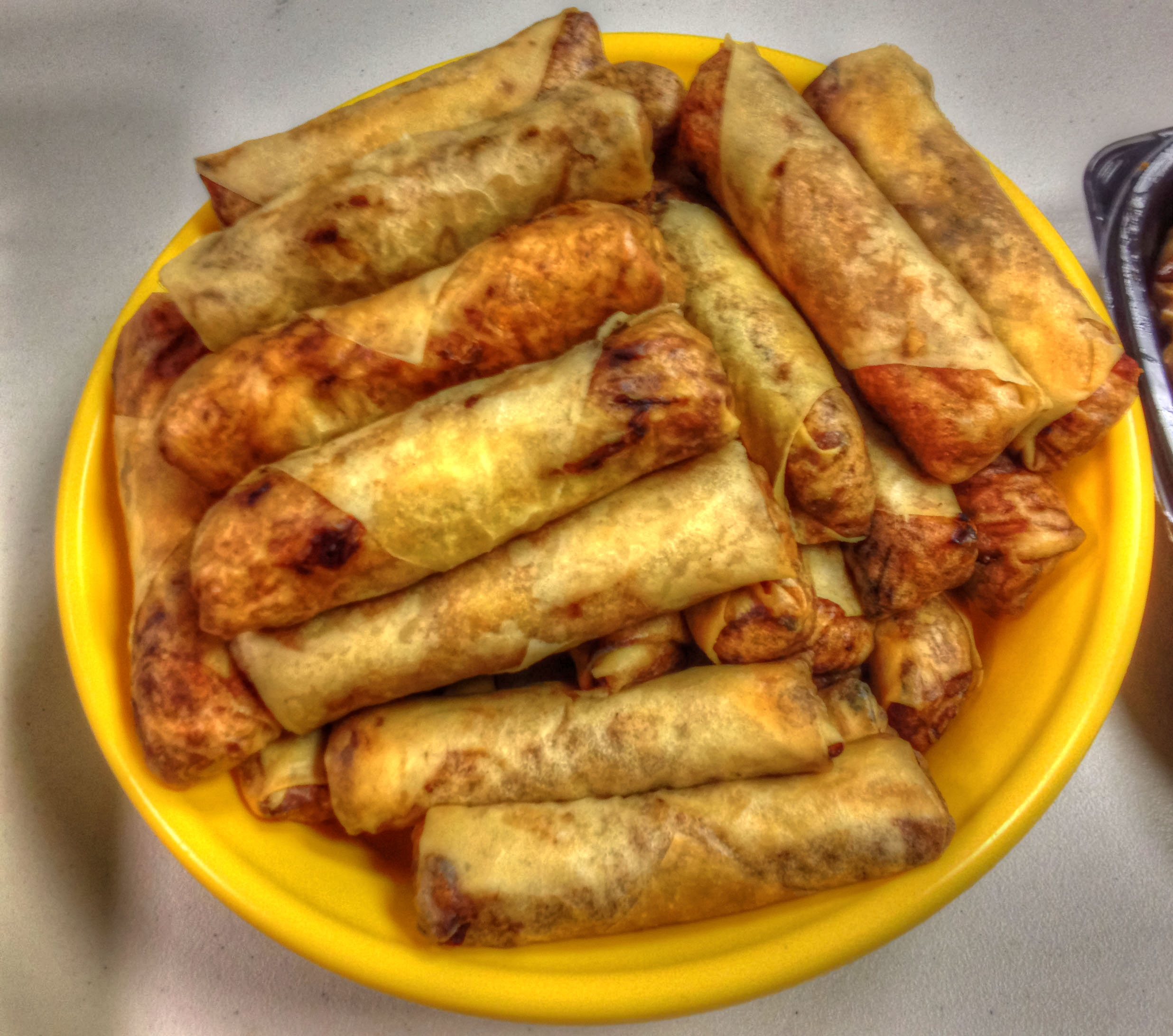
Hmong style egg rolls from Food Delicious

Traditional "Hmong" egg rolls can be culturally tied back to Vietnamese egg rolls during their migration across Asia. These fried and flour wrapped rolls can be found at family events and annual events such as the Hmong New Year. The Hmong community of Rhode Island holds an annual fundraiser by selling traditional Hmong egg rolls.

Each family has their own recipe, but typically the rolls consist of eggs mixed with shredded carrots and cabbage, ground pork, onions, scallions, and cilantro. These are seasoned with oyster sauce, rolled in a paper-thin wheat shell, and deep fried.

=== Nab vam (tri-color) ===
Dyed tapioca jelly with a sweet coconut sauce. Nab vam (pronounced as Nah-vah) is a traditional Hmong drink that is occasionally served during special events. In English, it can sometimes be called “tri-color”. Naab vaam is a sweetened dessert drink that consists of coconut, tapioca pearls, cendol, and many other toppings that are mixed in. In Hmong culture, it is essential to have toppings such as colored chestnuts, gelatin, sweet fruit, and grass jelly. Most of these toppings can be made from scratch by using sugar, coconut milk, and rice flour.

=== Khaub piaj/ko pia (chicken soup with rice noodles) ===
A simple chicken soup with homemade rice noodles adopted from the Lao. There are various names and spellings such as khaub piaj and ko pia or kopia.

=== Zaub qaub (pickled mustard greens) ===
Mustard greens fermented in rice water or salt and vinegar. Commonly served with a meat dish such as Hmong sausage and sticky rice.

== Agricultural traditions ==
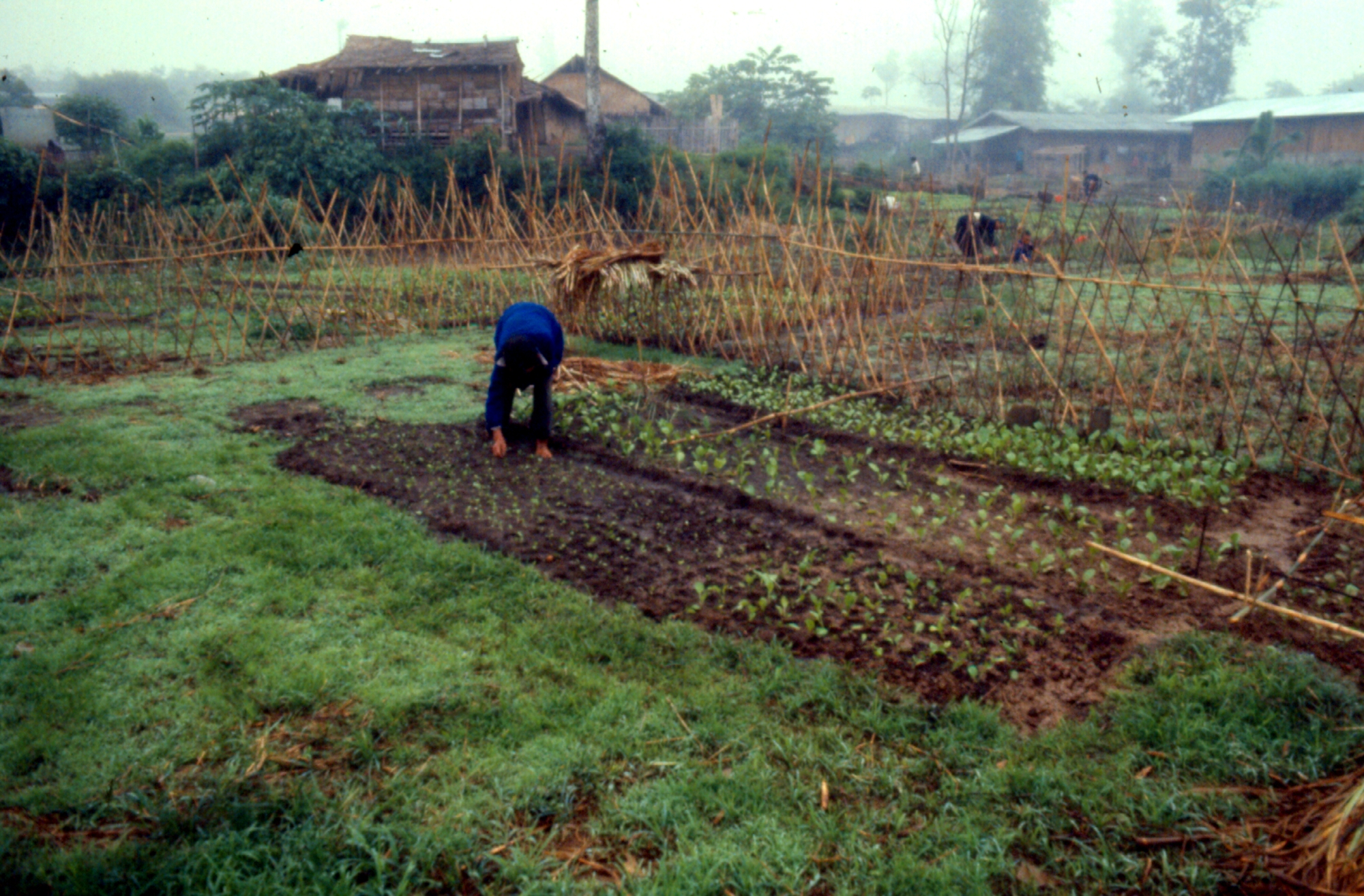
Farming at a Hmong refugee camp in Thailand

Hmong people are traditionally agricultural. Diaspora communities in the United States are known for their thriving home and community garden spaces, as well as strains of plants unique to Hmong seed keepers. Hmong New Year, the most major annual event, is centered around the annual rice harvest and involves nearly a week of feasts and whole roasted pigs. Rice is considered the Hmong staple crop and is incorporated in most meals. Maize is an alternate staple crop for some Hmong villages.

A study of six Hmong villages in Northern Thailand found that vegetable stems and leaves were the main form of food, and the Hmong villagers consumed a total of 130 different species of vegetable. The most common preparations were raw or boiled in chicken soup. While many vegetables were cultivated, some were foraged from surrounding forests. Hmong cultivation of endangered plants for food was found to indirectly support their conservation.

Some key crops that Hmong American farmers produce are amaranth, bitter melon, mini and regular bitterball, Chinese long beans, cucuzza squash, gai lon (gai lan, Chinese broccoli), "Hmong corn", Hmong cucumbers, and "Hmong greens" (yu choy).

=== Herbs ===
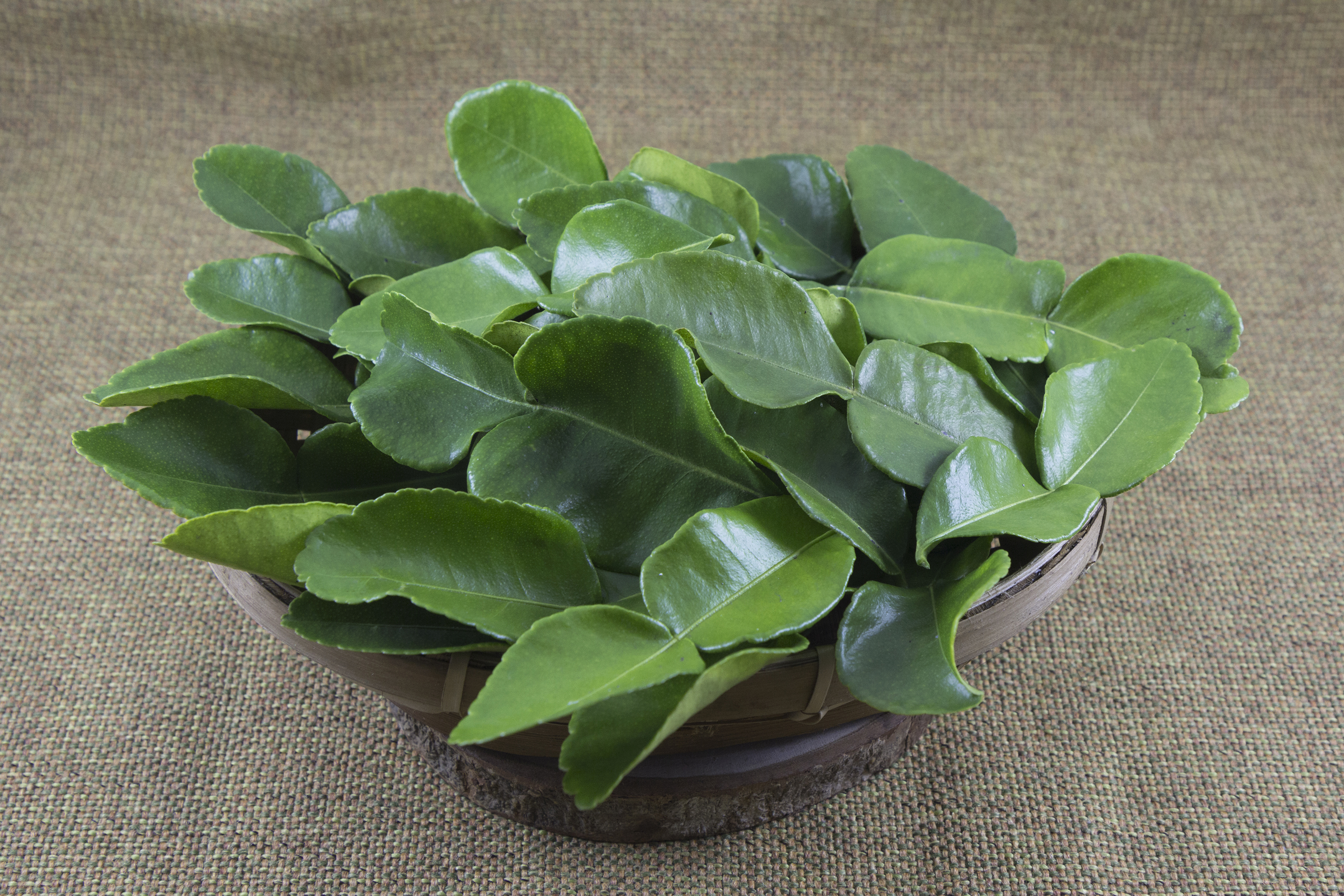
Kaffir lime leaf is a popular Hmong seasoning.

Herbs are used as food, seasoning, and traditional medicine–frequently all three at once.

Hmong Americans tend to grow herbs in small pots and plots at home so they are close at hand for harvesting fresh and cooking quickly. Fresh herbs are so central to traditional Hmong cuisine, one participant in a Fresno, California majority-Hmong community garden said: "If you see pots outside with cilantro and [green onions], you know this is Hmong family."

A common herb combination is "chicken herbs": a bundle that includes usually eight herbs used to flavor a chicken soup from traditional Hmong medicine (Nqaij Qaib Hau Xyaw Tshuaj). The recipe is considered by some to be the signature Hmong dish.

Common herbs in tshuaj rau qaib (chicken soup herbs) mixture:

- Ncas liab
- Ntiv (Joe-pye weed strain)
- Zej tshua ntuag
- Koj liab/ko taw os liab
- Tshuaj rog liab
- Nkaj liab Hmoob (Iresine)
- Pawj qaib (grassy-leaved sweet flag)
- Xuv ntsim
- Tauj dub (Cymbopogon citratus, known as lemon grass)
- Nroj rog liab (Okinawan spinach)
- Limnophila rugosa
- Sedum sarmentosum

=== Livestock ===
Hmong traditionally raise livestock such as chickens, cattle, and pigs. Chicken is a common meat while meats such as beef and pork were reserved for special occasions. In the 2000s an estimated 600 Hmong poultry farms existed in the United States, particularly in Southern states such as Arkansas, Missouri, Oklahoma, and North Carolina. Chicken is core to Hmong cuisine and additionally serves ritual purposes and features in traditional embroidery.

Hunting, fishing, and foraging meat remain a significant supplement to livestock, even for Hmong diaspora in the United States. A study of Hmong households in Wisconsin recorded that 60% regularly hunted and fished, which was twice the rate of the general population.

== Hmong American cuisine ==
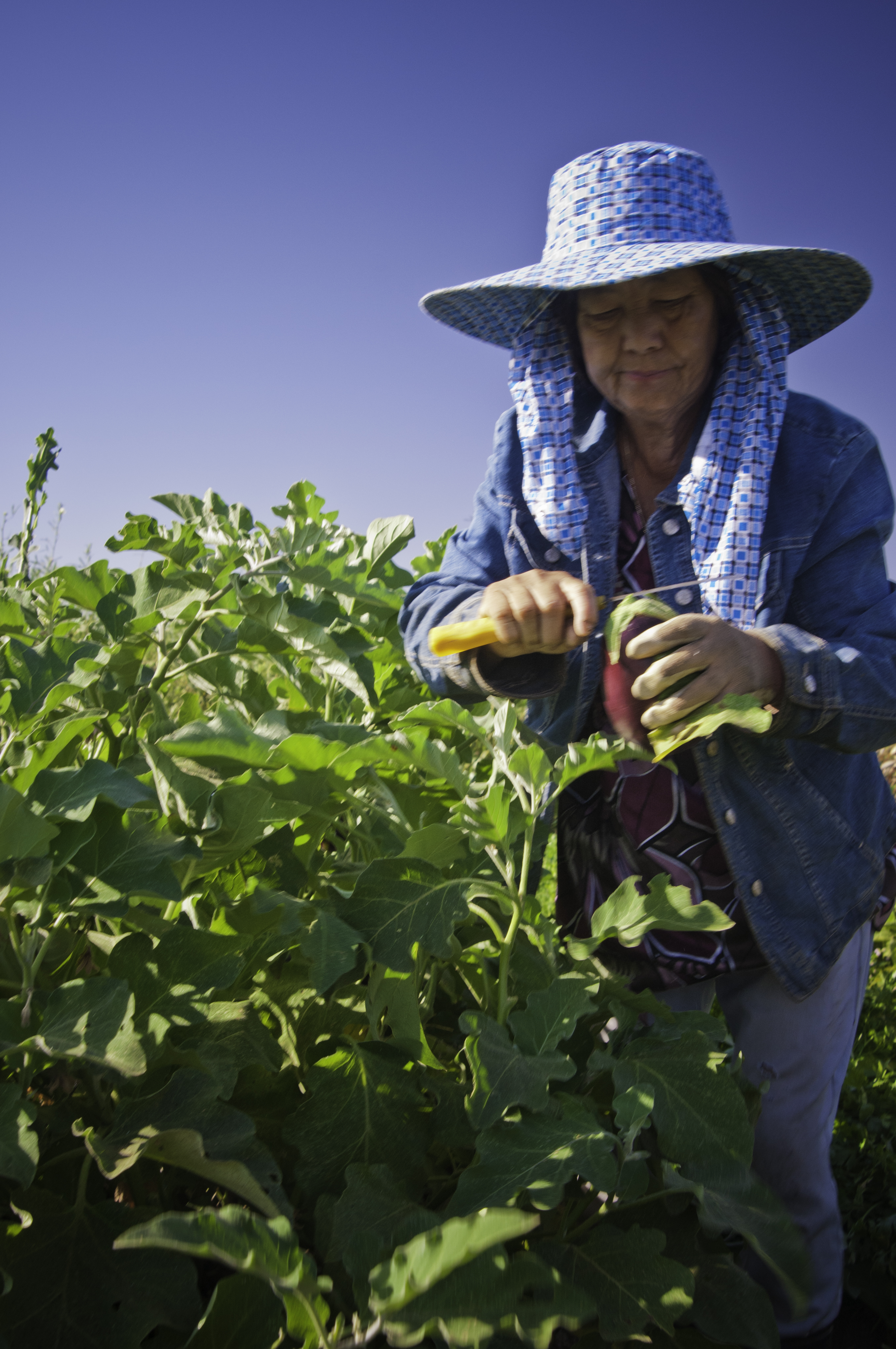
Hmong American woman farming

Mass immigration of Hmong refugees from Southeast Asia in the 1980s after the Laotian Civil War led to a sizable population of Hmong people in the United States, primarily Fresno, California, and Saint Paul, Minnesota. These Hmong adapted their own Southeast Asian cuisine to the realities of refugee camps in Thailand and poverty in the United States. Dishes tend to be small but flavorful, seasoned generously with herbs and spices. Rice is a staple in meals to balance out strong flavors. Hmong-style American food such as spiced hamburgers is sometimes called "Mee-Ka".

Hmong American scholar Kou Yang says that Hmong American cuisine is distinct from other cuisines of the Hmong diaspora because it incorporates a large number of national cuisines from Asia with a number of Western cuisines including American and French. Prominent Hmong chefs in Minnesota are trained in Western-style cooking, and make Hmong cuisine with similarities to the food of Laos, Thailand, and Vietnam.

Hmong American households tend to be smaller than traditional Hmong households, with an average of three people per household and a focus on nuclear family versus extended tribe and clan ties, changing how food is produced and consumed, including making smaller meals. Hmong Americans born abroad who grew up in America may identify as a third culture kid, a child who was influenced by an exceptionally large number of cultures and as a result feels they have their own new culture, especially around food. Some sources also describe this as the "one-and-a-half generation". Hmong households in Minnesota were found to have the highest frequency of family meals and adolescent involvement in food preparation, versus other ethnic groups.

=== Holidays and religion ===
While Christian and American holidays are widely adopted, they are celebrated in distinctly Hmong ways with traditional costumes and Hmong cuisine. A Thanksgiving meal might look like rice, Hmong sausage, and boiled chicken alongside the traditional American turkey, mashed potatoes, and gravy. Hmong sausage is a common dish during Hmong New Years celebrations and at other large gatherings such as festivals and graduations. It is typically served with purple sticky rice, a preparation for naturally dyed glutinous rice.

Because many Hmong American Christians do not eat food made with blood, during mixed gatherings with Christians and traditional animists multiple forms of foods are prepared with and without blood.

=== Commercial food preparation ===
Yia Vang founded Vinai in 2024 and ran a popular restaurant called Union Hmong Kitchen in Minneapolis, Minnesota.

Hmongtown Marketplace in Saint Paul, Minnesota, serves a variety of Hmong-style foods.

=== Notable figures ===
Notable figures in Hmong American cuisine include:

- Yia Vang, celebrity chef and restaurateur
- Diane Moua, pastry chef
- Marc Heu, French pastry chef
- Thony Yang, chef de cuisine at Four Seasons Hotel, Minneapolis
- La Vang-Herr, chef
- Noobstaa Philip Vang, chef and entrepreneur
- Genevieve Vang, chef and restauranteur

== In popular culture ==
- Chef Yia Vang featured Hmong food in Iron Chef: Quest for an Iron Legend episode six, "Battle Chili Peppers".
- Dishes from Hmongtown Marketplace vendors were featured in 2019 as part of CNN's Emmy Award-winning United Shades of America with owner Toua Xiong and local Hmong American chef Yia Vang.
- Award-winning Hmong American poet May Lee-Yang writes about Hmong food culture such as in The Things a Hmong Woman Loves: "a Hmong Woman loves baby / cucumbers, unripened papayas, and green mangoes / anything she can dip with chili peppers and fish sauce / to spice up her life"
- New York Times June 26, 2025, feature by Brett Anderson on Yia Vang and Diane Moua and their roles with great Hmong food

== Gallery ==
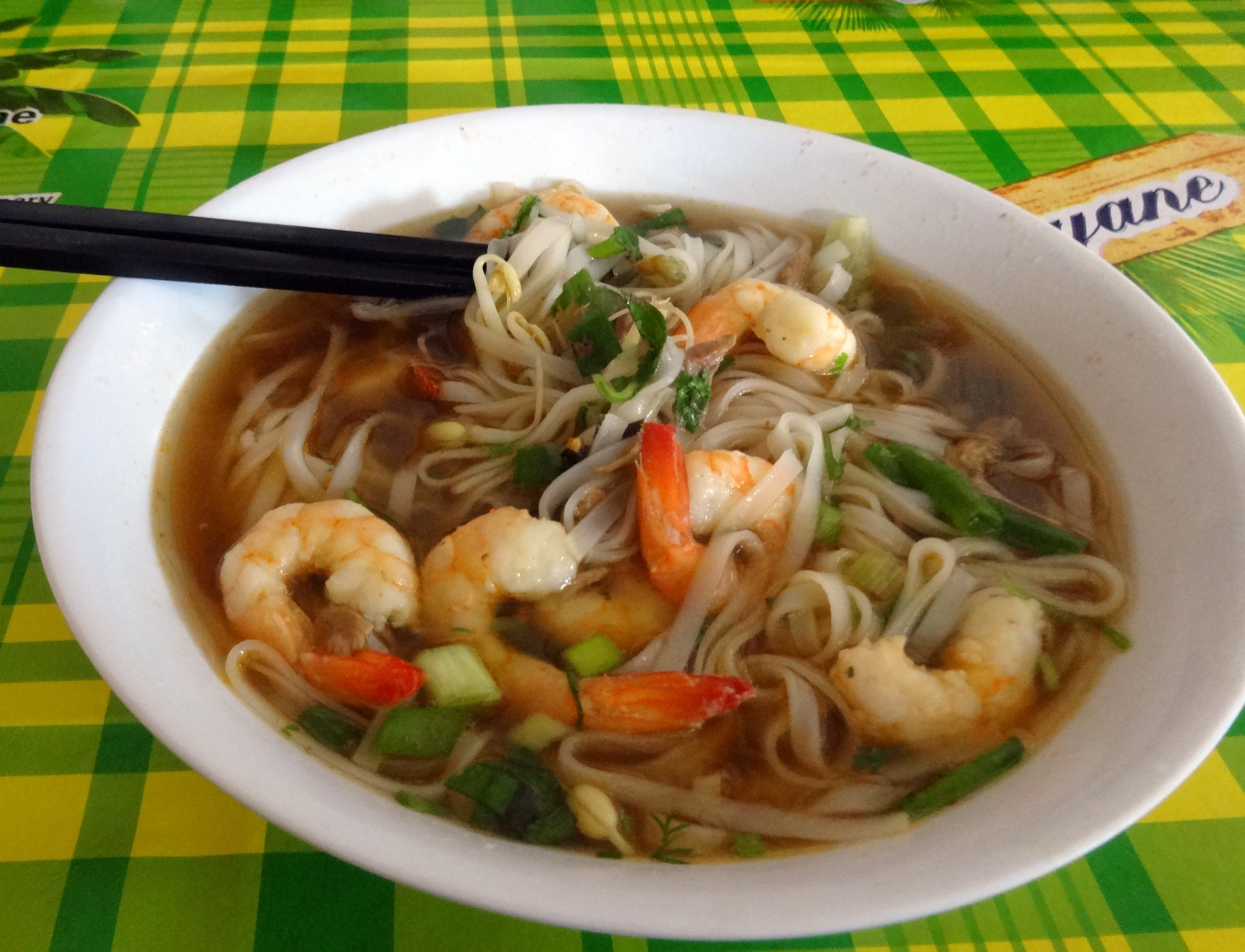
Laotian bowl of Pheu Hmong at Sunday Market in French Guiana

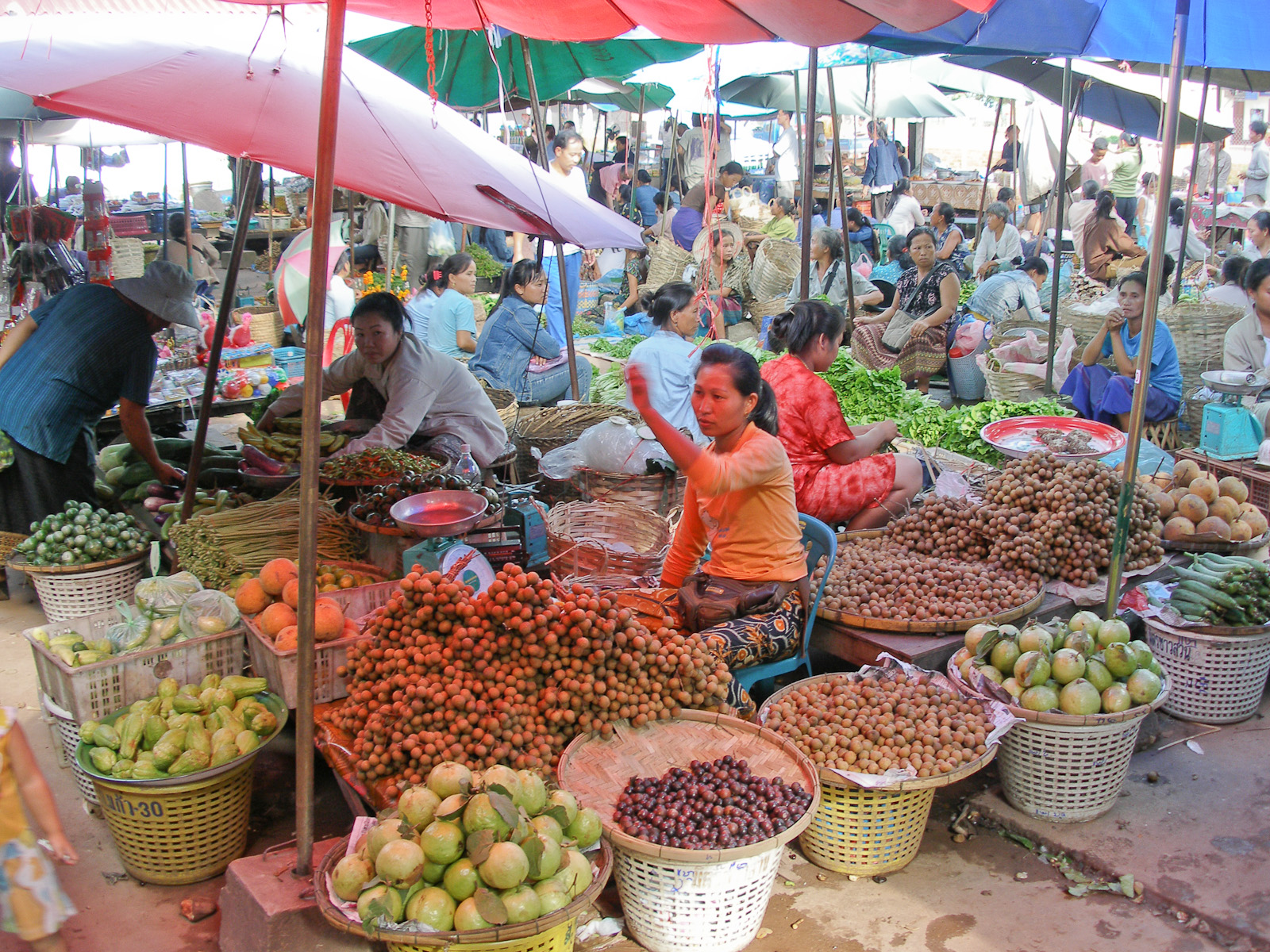
An ethnic Hmong marketplace in Laos

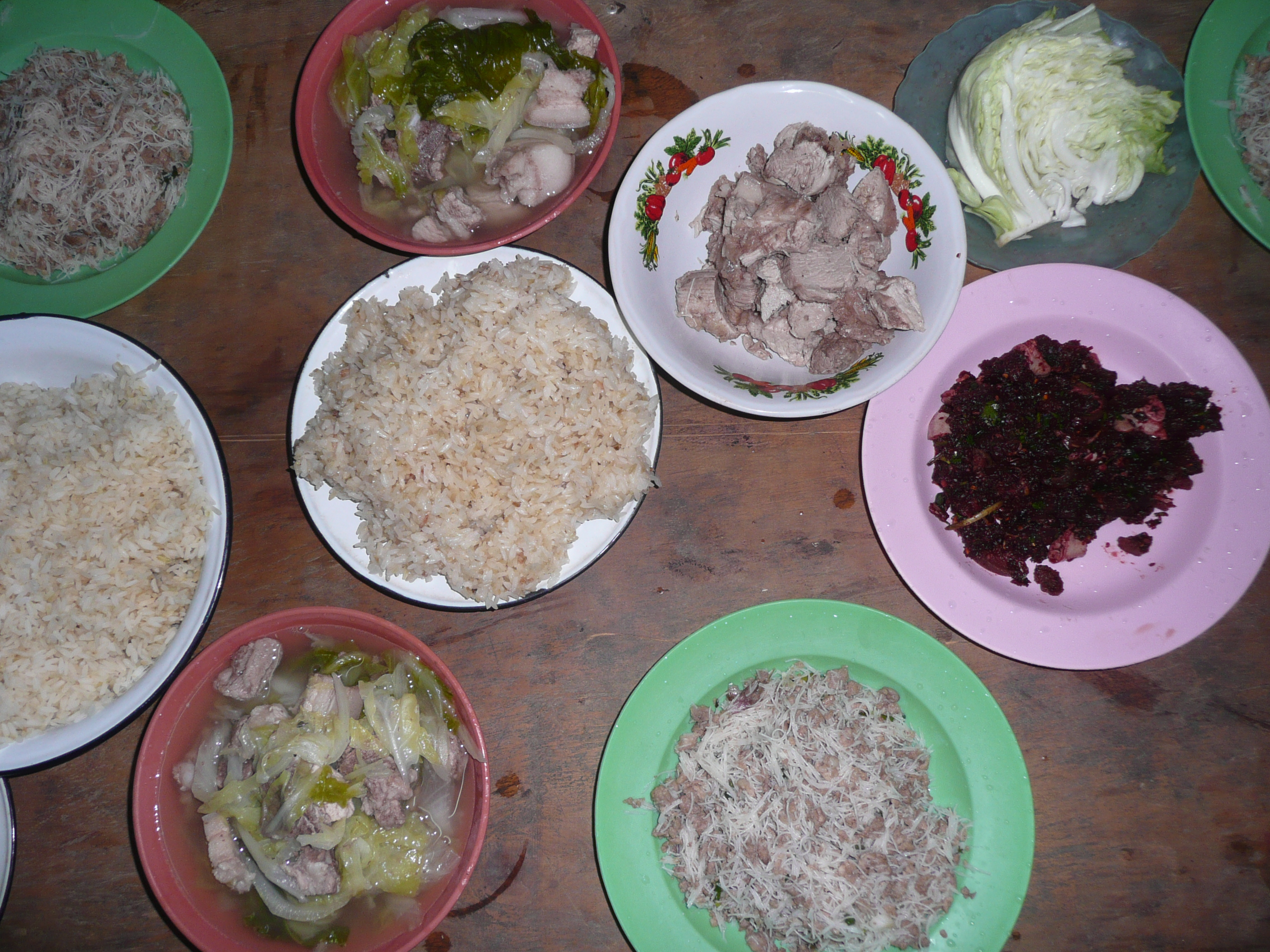
A Hmong dinner table

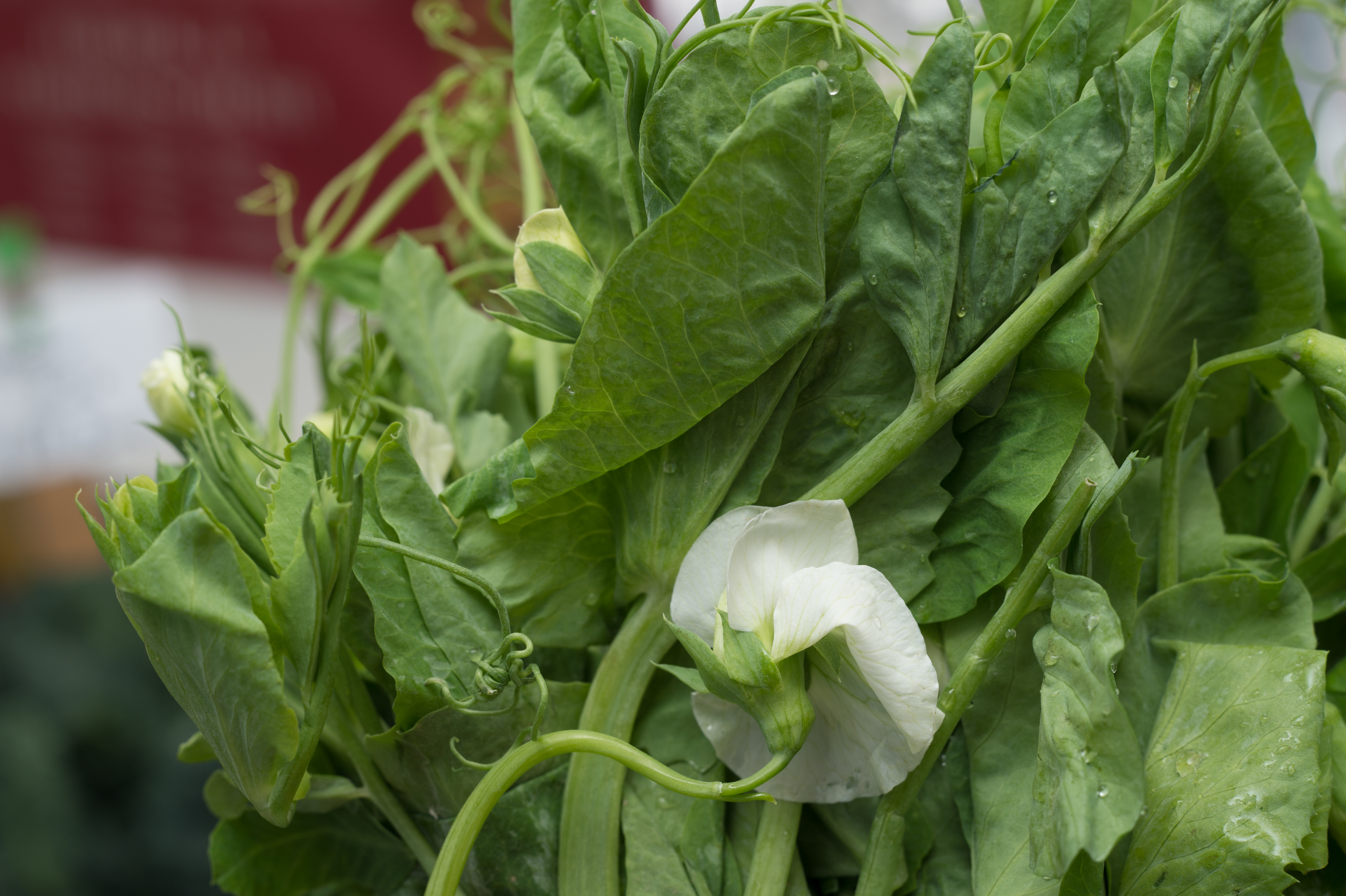
Pea shoots for sale from a Hmong farmers market vendor in California

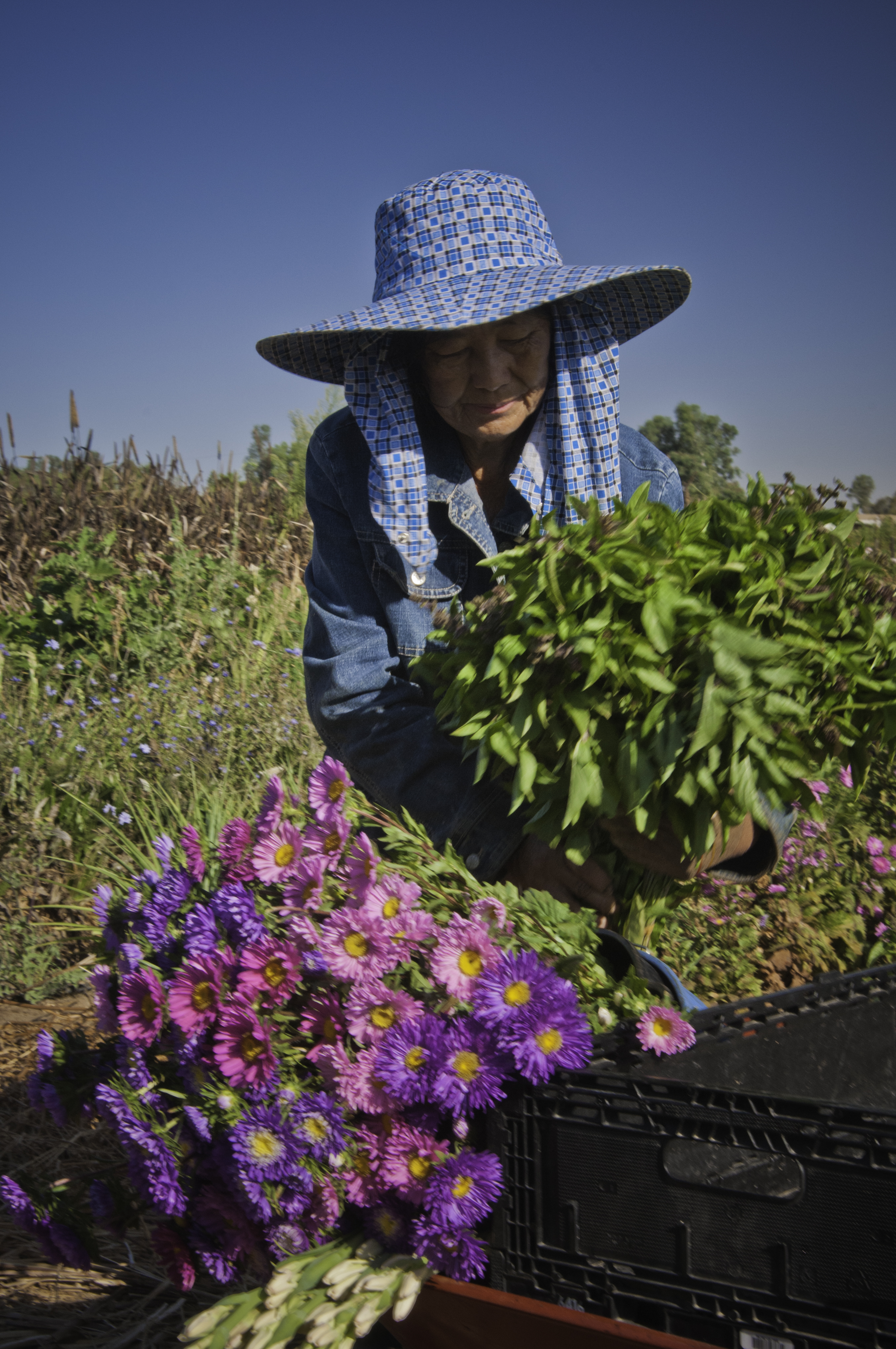
A Hmong farmer harvesting flowers and herbs in California

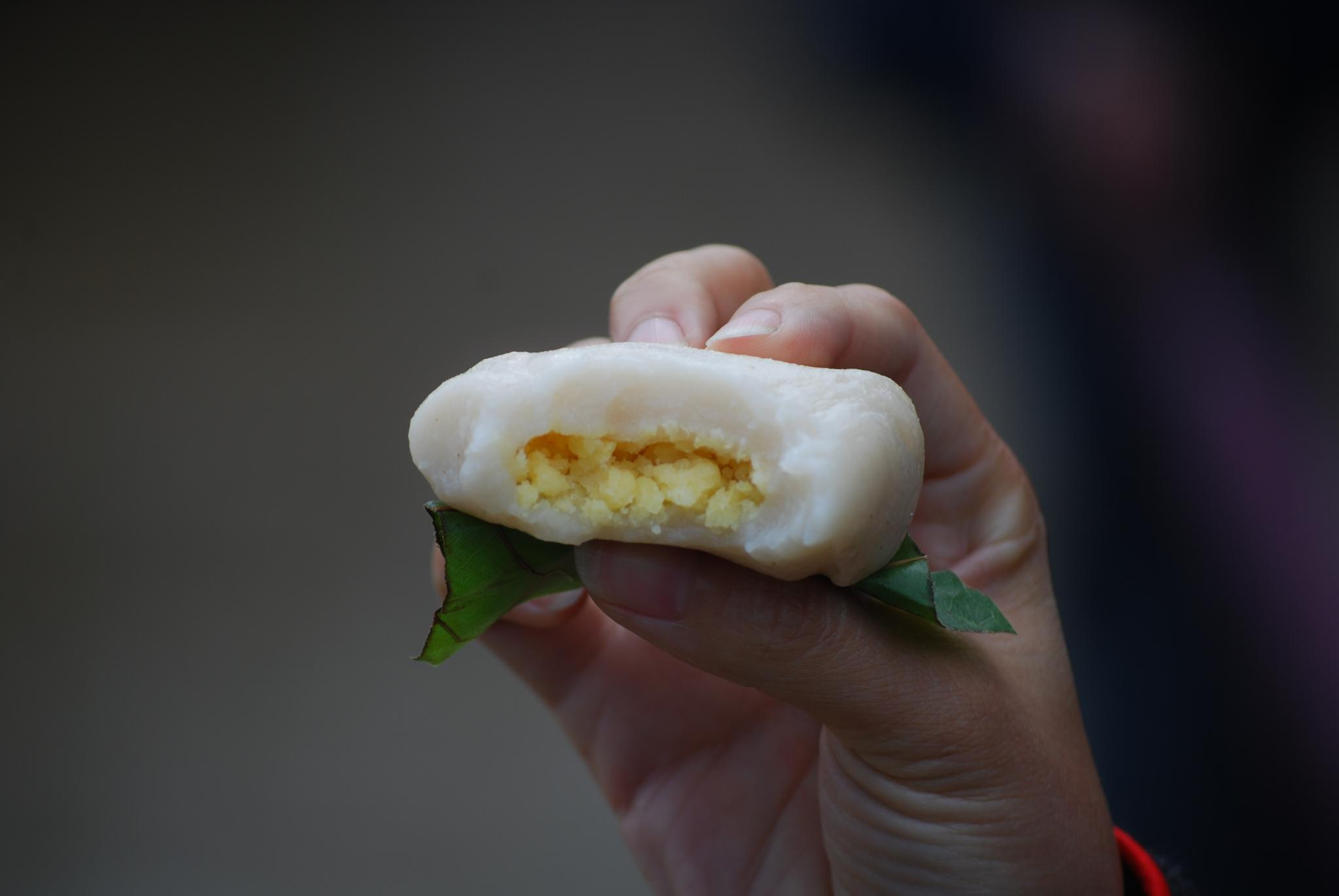
Mung bean cake at Bắc Hà Sunday Market in Vietnam

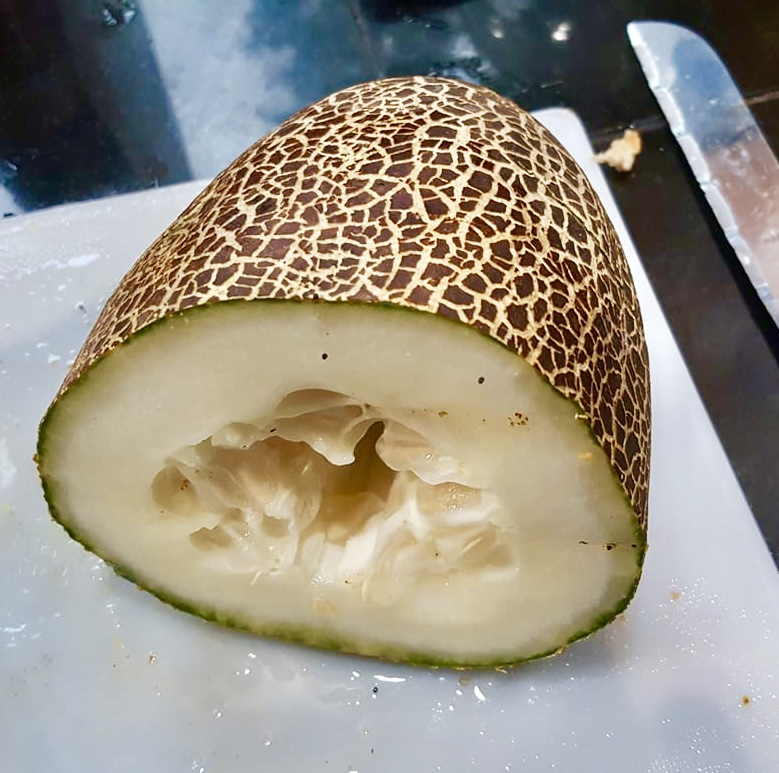
A varietal of cucumber grown by the Hmong people

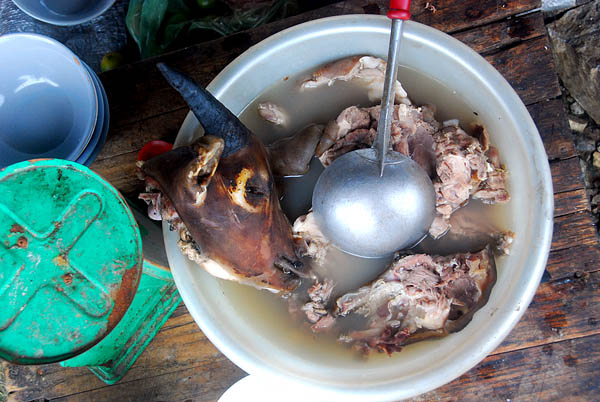
Hmong goat head soup meal at Bắc Hà Sunday Market in Vietnam

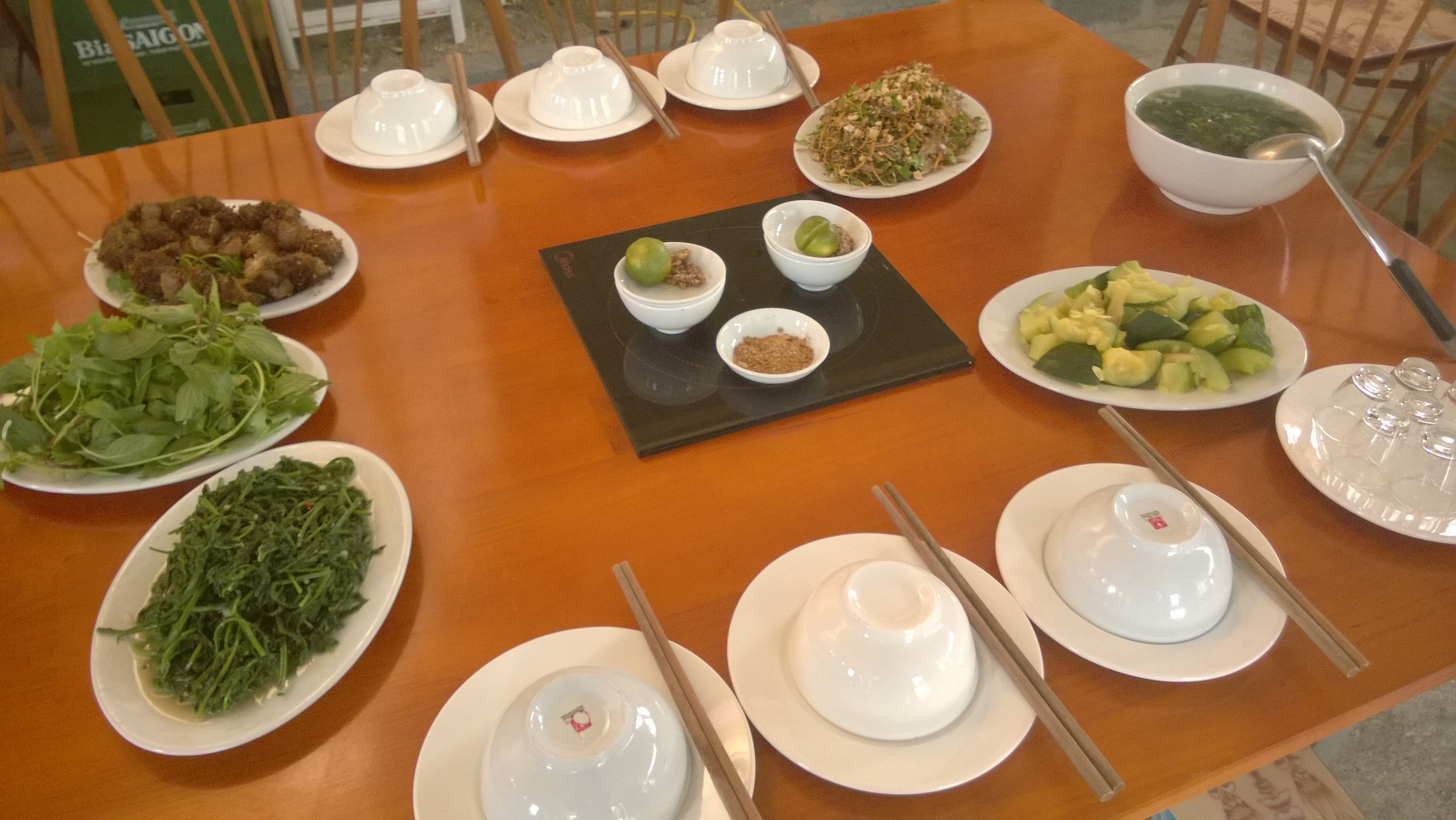
A Hmong specialities restaurant in Ha Giang city, Vietnam, in 2014

== See also ==
- List of Asian cuisines
