= Hmong sausage =

Long thick pork sausage seasoned with herbs

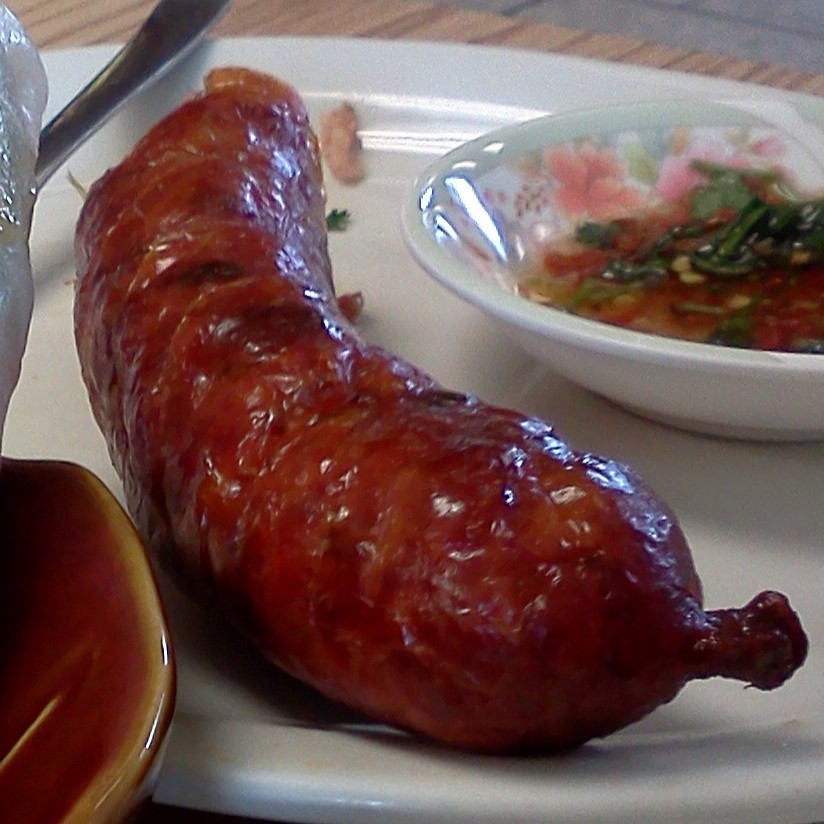
- Sausage meal from a Wisconsin Hmong restaurant
- Alternative names: hnyuv ntxwm hmoob (Hmong)
- Type: sausage
- Region or state: Hmong diaspora, Southeast Asia
- Associated cuisine: Hmong cuisine
- Serving temperature: hot
- Main ingredients: pork; lemongrass; Thai chili; ginger or galangal
- Ingredients generally used: monosodium glutamate; salt; black pepper; garlic; scallions; shallots; fish sauce; oyster sauce; kaffir lime leaf or lime juice
- Variations: spicy, ginger, made with blood, egg roll-style
- Similar dishes: Lao sausage

Hmong sausage (Hmong: hnyuv ntxwm hmoob) is a long thick pork sausage from Hmong culture seasoned with herbs like lemongrass and Thai chili pepper. The sausage is commonly served during Hmong New Year celebrations. The exact recipe varies depending on factors such as clan and individual immigration background.

Hmong, being a diaspora, incorporate a wide variety of ingredients, methods, and cultural backgrounds in Hmong cuisine such as Hmong sausage. There is no standard recipe for Hmong sausage, but the key ingredients are coarse ground fatty pork cuts such as pork belly and pork shoulder, Thai chili peppers, lemongrass, kaffir lime leaf or lime juice, and fresh ginger root or galangal. Other common ingredients are salt, black pepper, garlic, scallions, shallots, fish sauce, oyster sauce, cilantro, green onion, serrano pepper, and monosodium glutamate (MSG). Fresh aromatic herbs are prioritized for flavor and are visible under the sausage casing. One commercial producer sells a number of popular variations: original (no chilies), spicy (with chilies), ginger, made with pork blood, and "egg roll-style" made with vermicelli noodles and other egg roll fillings.

The sausage is usually sold and served fresh, although some variations are lightly fermented or cured. Commercial outlets ship the sausage frozen.

Hmong sausage is typically grilled at a low heat and served as large slices with steamed white rice or purple sticky rice (another signature Hmong dish), pan-fried with blanched cabbage, or with pho soup. Sour and spicy sauces are served on the side, especially a Hmong sauce made with Thai chilies called "pepper dip". Reflecting the diverse backgrounds of Hmong people, some restaurants offer "Thai-style" or "Lao-style" preparations. The sausage is widely available in Hmong communities at restaurants, butchers, and delis. One Hmong American grocery store processed and sold about 700 pounds of Hmong sausage daily.

== Culture ==
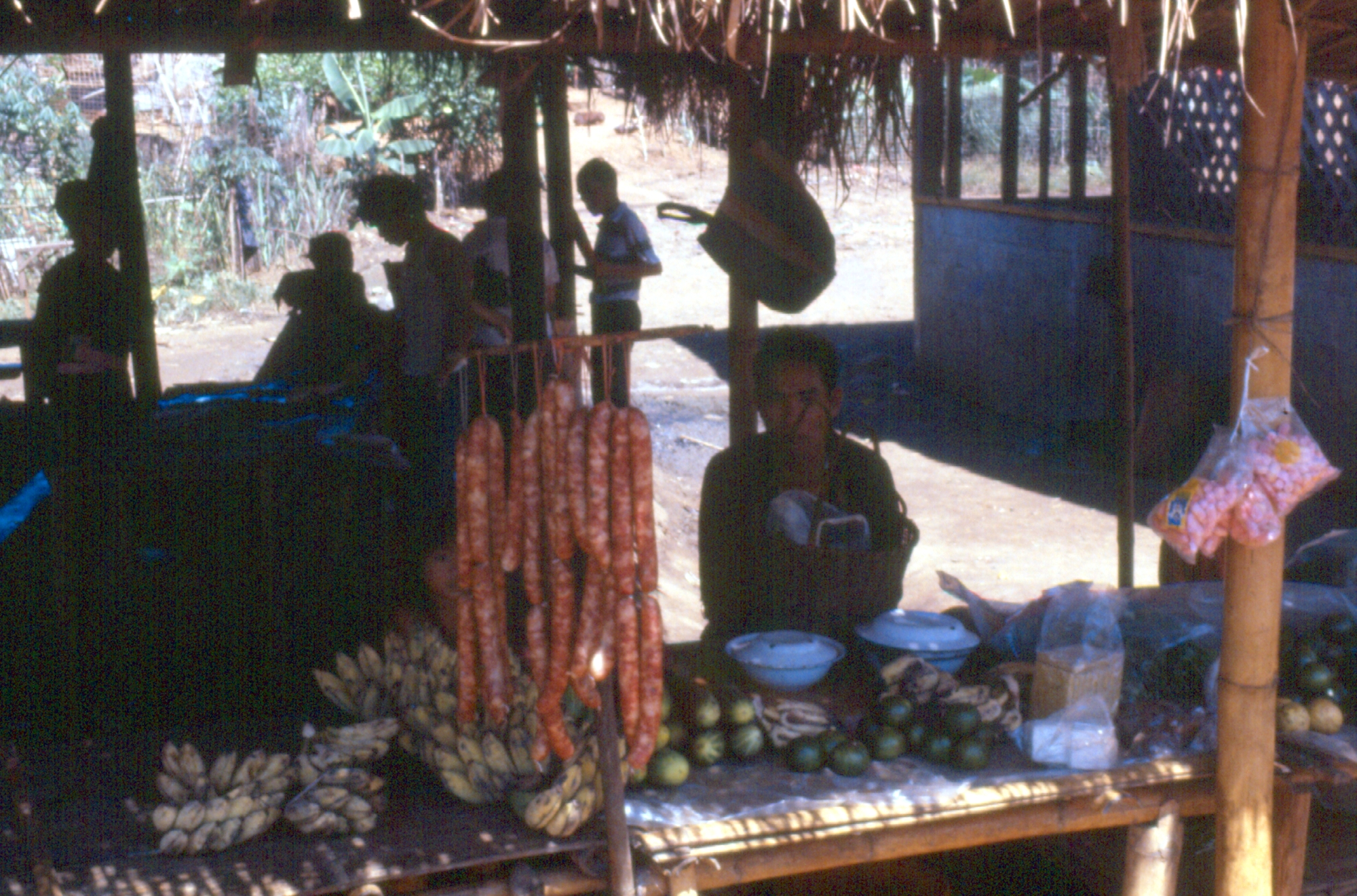
A vendor selling sausages at the Hmong Ban Vinai Refugee Camp, Thailand, c. 1985.

Many Hmong Americans express that making and eating traditional Hmong foods such as sausage connects them to their identity and family history. About Hmong sausage in relation to the difficult background of Hmong immigrants, Minnesota Hmong American chef Yia Vang said: "This sausage is redemption... I’m proud of it... I’m not ashamed anymore. This shit is legacy."

Hmong sausage is commonly processed and served during special occasions like Hmong New Year celebrations. Hmong American families tend to make the sausage in large batches with common American processing equipment such as sausage stuffing machines and synthetic sausage casing, although historically and in other Hmong diasporas across the world the sausage is produced by hand, frequently in small batches. Chef Yia Vang remembered his father teaching him to coarsely chop pork by hand and stuff it into intestine casing with a modified Coca-Cola bottle. Similarly, Wisconsin Hmong American chef Diane Moua recalled: "I remember vividly my grandma making Hmong sausage. I called my mom, because I wasn't sure, but I remember as a kid she chopped it up and put it in this casing..."

Hmong Americans tend to make the sausage a foot or more long and very thick, then eat it fresh or freeze it to preserve it. Some families prefer shorter sausages. Others prefer to lightly ferment or smoke the sausage for flavor and preservation.

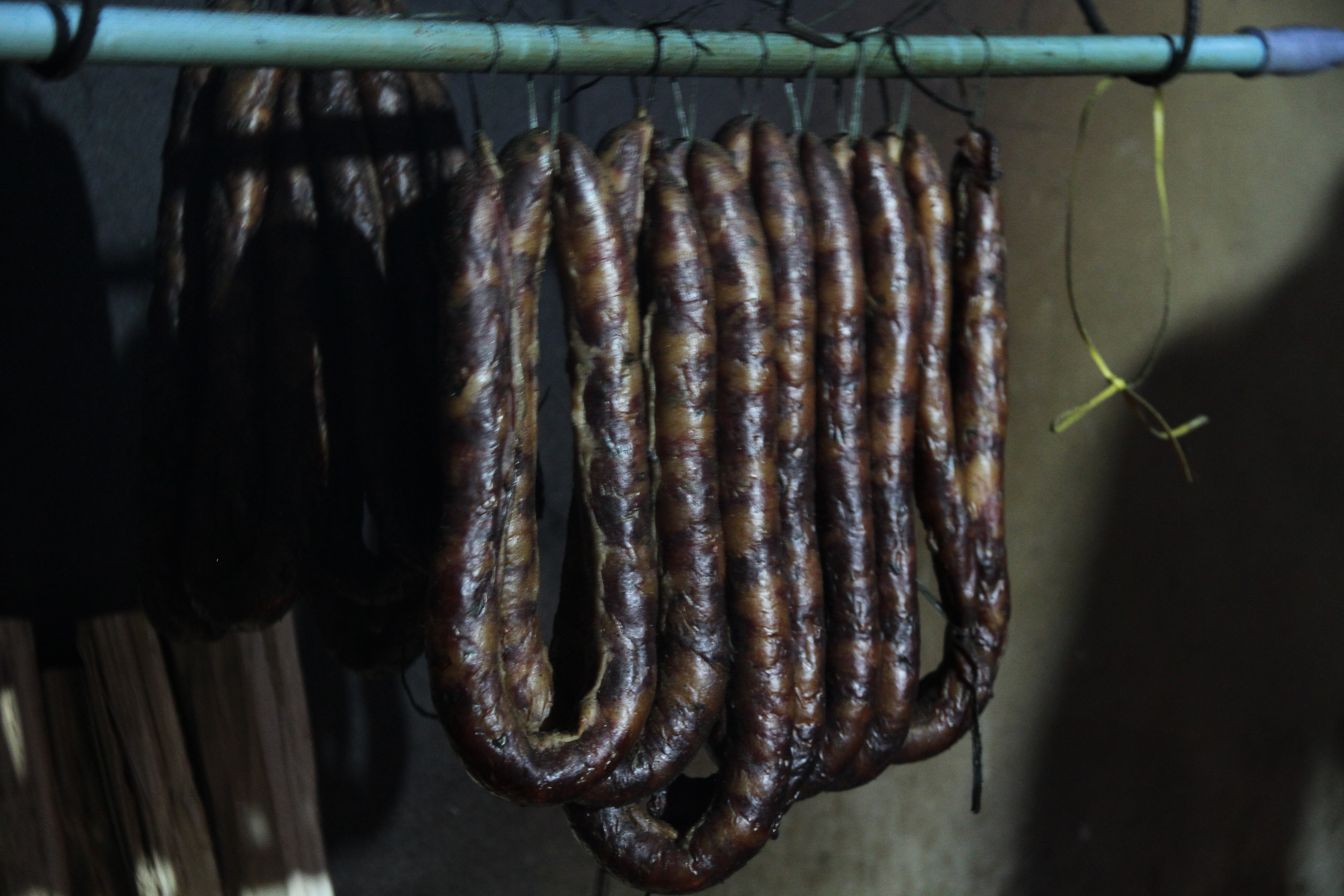
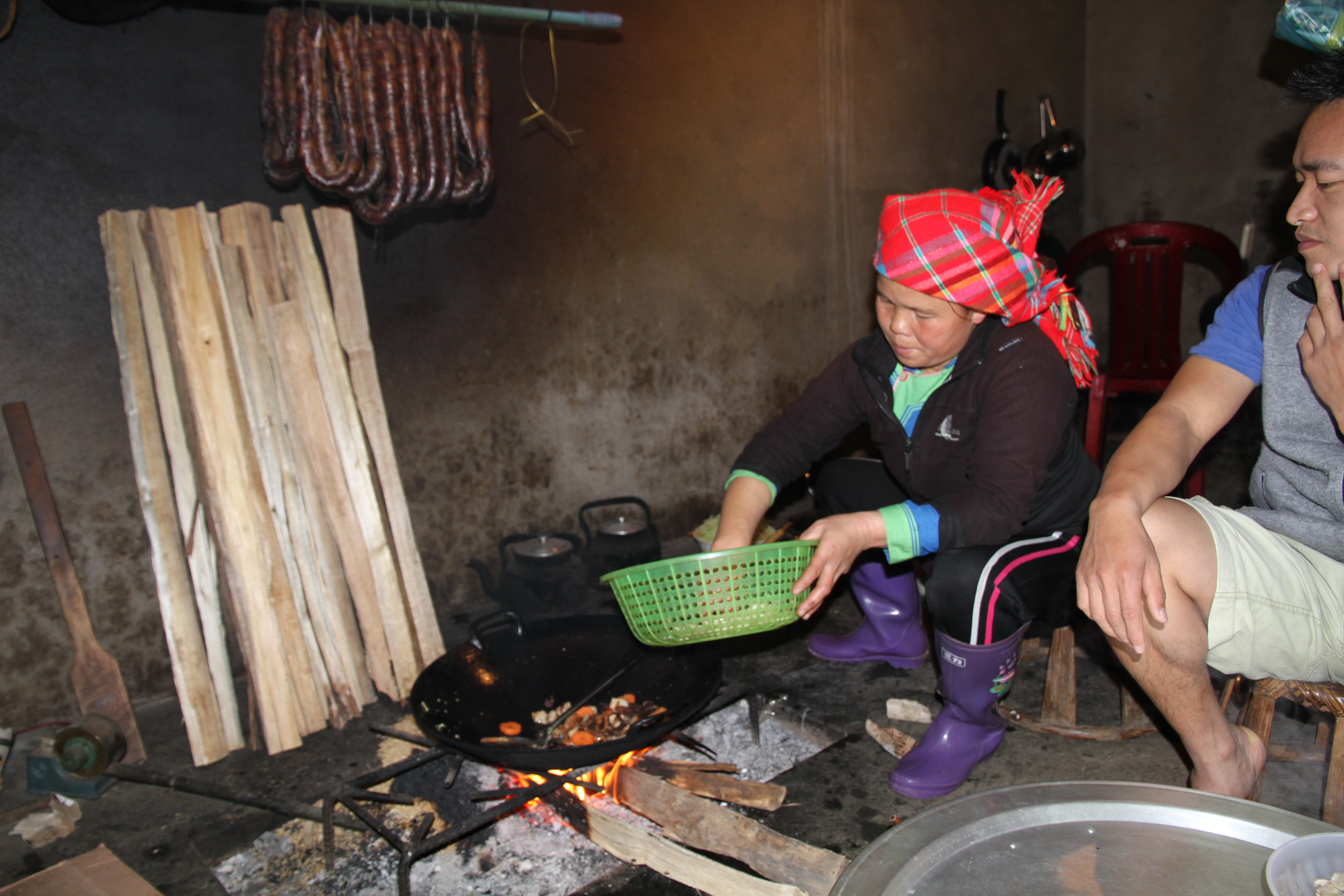
Looped blood sausage made by Vietnamese Hmong in 2011.

Hmong families pass down "secret" sausage recipes and do not disclose the exact ingredients or methods they use. In Cooking from the Heart: The Hmong Kitchen in America (2023), an authoritative Hmong American cookbook, the authors say, "Good cooks guard their sausage recipes, and everyone makes sausage a little differently." La Vang-Herr, proprietor of @La's, a Hmong food cart in Aloha, Oregon, declined to share their recipe and revealed only that the main ingredients of their sausage are "juicy ground pork and aromatics like ginger and lemongrass".

== Commercial preparation ==
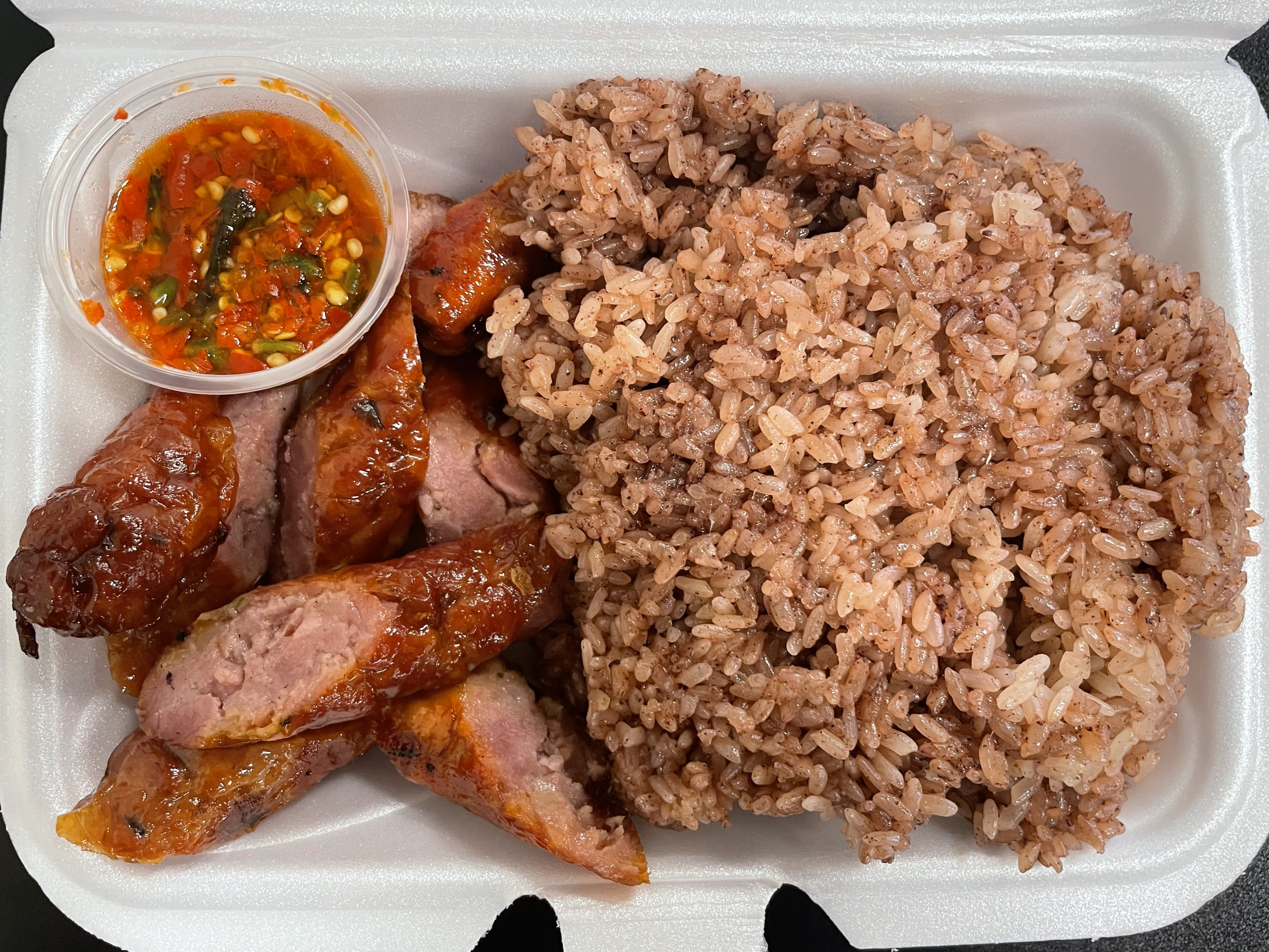
Pork sausage with purple sticky rice from Naw-Maw Kitchen at Hmongtown Marketplace.

Hmong sausage has been commercially produced in the United States. Hmong-focused grocery stores and marketplaces such as Hmongtown Marketplace process and sell the sausages raw or prepared and ready-to-eat. Founded by Yia Vang, restaurant Union Hmong Kitchen processed and sold prepared Hmong sausage in Minnesota as a restaurant pop up, and later debuted a seasonal stand at the Minnesota State Fair in 2022 with dishes such as purple sticky rice and Hmong sausage made with crunchy Thai chili oil. Union Hmong Kitchen began serving the sausage at Target Field in 2023. Kramarczuk's, a James Beard Award-winning Ukrainian deli in Minneapolis, makes and sells Union Hmong Kitchen branded Hmong sausage. Discussing Yia Vang's restaurants, Minnesota Monthly listed Hmong sausage as one of Minnesota's most iconic foods.

== In popular culture ==
- Food critic Andrew Zimmern featured the Hmong sausage with purple sticky rice meal at Hmongtown Marketplace on Bizarre Foods: Delicious Destinations in 2016.

== See also ==
- Sai oua – a similar sausage
