= Yia Vang =

Hmong-American chef

Yia Vang (RPA: Yia Vaj, Pahawh: 𖬕𖬤 𖬖𖬰𖬜; born 1984) is a Hmong-American chef in Minneapolis, Minnesota.

== Early life and education ==
Vang was born in Ban Vinai refugee camp in Thailand after his family had fled Laos at the end of the Vietnamese War after the fall of Saigon. His father, Nhia Lor Vang, and mother, Pang Her, both widowed during the crossing of the Mekong, met at the camp in 1977 and married in 1978. Vang was born in 1984.

In 1987, when he was four, his family immigrated to the United States, first to Lancaster County, Pennsylvania, and then in 1997 to Port Edwards, Wisconsin. While growing up, he learned butchering when his family would buy whole animals. He graduated in 2010 from the University of Wisconsin-La Crosse with a degree in Interpersonal Communications and minor in PR and Marketing.

== Career ==
He started his kitchen career early as a dishwasher at Ridges Golf Course and cooked at Golden Sands Speedway. After College Vang moved to the Minneapolis area and worked at Gavin Kaysen’s Spoon and Stable and other restaurants, as a cook. He noticed that while the Twin Cities area has the largest Hmong population outside of Southeast Asia, it did not have a restaurant dedicated to Hmong cuisine.

Featured on the cover of Bon Appetit (May 2020) for his restaurant (Union Hmong Kitchen) and unique perspective on Hmong food, Vang was able to get national attention from the food media world. Recognition started with his first national feature on W. Kamau Bell Emmy Award winning show United Shades of America in 2019 and then getting his first feature on the Food Network digital series "Stoked". He has been featured on national press segments on "Good Morning America" and featured on the nationally acclaimed hunting podcast "MeatEater". Along with his hosting duties and guest appearances on television shows, Vang also is requested as a keynote speaker for companies such as Target Corporation, 3M, U.S. Bancorp, General Mills and many other Fortune Global 500 companies on the topic of Hmong food and culture.

=== Media host ===
In June 2022, he appeared on Iron Chef and in November 2022, he started hosting Feral, a show that explores the culinary use of invasive species such as wild boar, python and lion fish on the Outdoor Channel. He also started a podcast called Hmonglish with journalist Gia Vang about Hmong culture in America and another called White on Rice. He has also served as the host for the Twin Cities Public Television (PBS) series Relish. In 2024, Relish started its fifth season. In 2025, Relish won a James Beard Foundation Broadcast Media award for Lifestyle Visual Media.

=== Union Hmong Kitchen ===
Beginning in 2016, Vang opened an estimated 100 popups that he called Union Hmong Kitchen with menus including his father's Hmong sausage recipe and his mother's hot sauce recipe. He initially tried to cater to midwestern tastes but eventually decided it was disrespectful to Hmong food and decided to focus on traditional Hmong flavors and techniques.

Vang's first permanent brick-and-mortar space is Union Hmong Kitchen. The restaurant is located in Graze Provisions and Libations, a food hall in Minneapolis' North Loop neighborhood, which opened in October 2021.

Vang also ran a series of pop ups in a space on Lake Street in Minneapolis through 2023 before reopening the space as the second location of Union Hmong Kitchen.

in the fall of 2024 Union Hmong Kitchen was featured on Diner, Drive-Ins and Dives with host Guy Fieri. In November 2024, Vang closed the Graze location, and in December 2024 closed the Lake Street location, which pivoted to a catering focus.

Notable accolades:

2022 James Beard Award Semifinalist "Best New Restaurant"

=== Minnesota State Fair ===
In August 2022, Union Hmong Kitchen became the first Hmong food vendor in the Minnesota State Fair located in the International Bazaar. It has continued at the fair each year since. In 2023, it received the "Best Award" from the state fair. That year, Vang's mother led a crew of family and friends in making 18,500 galabaos for the fair. Galabaos are steamed buns with a pork and noodle mix and a hard boiled egg. The dish was so popular at the state fair that they had to make more.

=== Vinai ===
In 2020, Vang started a crowdfunding campaign to fund the opening of Vinai, a new higher-end restaurant. The COVID-19 pandemic slowed the development. Vang states that his goal is not to elevate Hmong food, but rather to illuminate Hmong food.

Vinai is named after the refugee camp in which he was born. Esquire called the restaurant one of the first dedicated Hmong restaurants in the United States. Vinai opened on July 30, 2024, in Northeast, Minneapolis, in the space previously occupied by Dangerous Man Brewing Company. Vang calls the restaurant a love letter to his parents, who met in the refugee camp where he was later born. Vinai gained many national and local accolades in the first six months of the restaurant.

Recently (March, 2025) Vinai was named one of the top 100 best places to visit in the world by TIME.

2024 The New York Times "America's Best 50 Restaurant"

2024 "Best New Restaurant in America" Eater

2024 "Best New Restaurant" Twin Cities Eater

2024 Esquire "Best New Restaurant in America" and "Best Chef"

2024 MN Star Tribune "Restaurant of the Year"

2024 Artful Living "Best New Restaurant"

2024 MSP Mag "Restaurant of the Year"

2025 James Beard Foundation "Best New Restaurant" Semi Finalist

2025 TIME "100 Best places in the World"

2025 Condé Nast "The Best Restaurant in the World: 2025 Hot List"

== Recognition ==
In 2019, Minneapolis St Paul Magazine named Vang Chef of the Year. In 2020, he was City Pages Outstanding Chef. In 2021, Francis Lam called Vang "one of America's leading voices in Hmong cooking". In 2022, Eater: Twin Cities named Vang Chef of the Year. In 2022, he was a James Beard Award finalist, and Union Hmong Kitchen was a semifinalist. In 2023, he was a James Beard Award semifinalist. Vang was named Chef of the Year by Esquire in 2024.

== Personal life ==
In 2021, Vang became a United States citizen.
