= Iron Chef: Quest for an Iron Legend =

American cooking show

- Genre: Cooking show
- Developed by: Daniel Calin
- Presented by: Alton Brown; Kristen Kish; Mark Dacascos
- Starring: Curtis Stone; Marcus Samuelsson; Dominique Crenn; Gabriela Cámara; Ming Tsai
- Country of origin: United States
- Original language: English
- No. of seasons: 1
- No. of episodes: 8

Production
- Executive producers: Daniel Calin; Eytan Keller; Ross Weintraub
- Production companies: Keller Productions; 3Ball Productions

Original release
- Network: Netflix
- Release: June 15, 2022

Related
- Iron Chef; Iron Chef America

Iron Chef: Quest for an Iron Legend is an American cooking show reboot of Iron Chef and Iron Chef America. Alton Brown returns to co-host the show with Kristen Kish, and Mark Dacascos again serves as The Chairman. Contestants challenge the Iron Chefs in a cookoff with a secret ingredient, and in this series, the highest scoring challenger battles with all five Iron Chefs one more time in hopes of becoming an Iron Legend. The series was released on Netflix on June 15, 2022.

== Format ==
Five new Iron Chefs have been introduced: Curtis Stone, Dominique Crenn, Marcus Samuelsson, Ming Tsai and Gabriela Cámara. Challenger chefs compete against the Iron Chefs to prepare a dish centered around a secret ingredient revealed by The Chairman. Hosts Alton Brown and Kristen Kish provide real-time commentary on how the competition proceeds, with Kish occasionally filling the role performed by Shinichiro Ohta on the original show and Kevin Brauch on Iron Chef America as floor reporter. Each episode has three judges, Nilou Motamed, Andrew Zimmern, and a third guest judge. Unlike prior iterations, Brown and Kish also try the dishes and participate in deliberation with the judges, although their votes are not counted in the final score. At the end of the season, the highest-scoring challenger returns to face off against all five Iron Chefs in hopes of becoming an Iron Legend and receiving a Golden Knife.

== Episodes ==
Each episode has three judges, Nilou Motamed, Andrew Zimmern, and a third guest judge.

Episode	Title	Iron Chef	Challenger	Challenger specialty	Secret ingredient(s) or theme	Winner	Final score
1	"Battle Street Food"	Curtis Stone	Mason Hereford	Sandwiches	Street Food (Theme) Lamb (Secret Ingredient)	Curtis Stone	85–78
2	"Battle Tailgate"	Marcus Samuelsson	Esther Choi	Korean Fusion	Tailgate (Theme) Ribs (Secret Ingredient)	Esther Choi	86–81
3	"Battle Milk"	Dominique Crenn	Curtis Duffy		Farm (Theme) Milk (Secret Ingredient)	Dominique Crenn	87–82
4	"Battle Medieval"	Gabriela Cámara, Dominique Crenn, Marcus Samuelsson, and Curtis Stone	N/A (Battle of Iron Chefs)		Medieval Times (Theme) Game birds, Mushrooms, and Grapes (Secret Ingredients)	Gabriela Cámara and Marcus Samuelsson	85–84
5	"Battle Chocolate"	Ming Tsai	Claudette Zepeda	Regional Mexican cuisine	Youth (Theme) Chocolate (Secret Ingredient)	Claudette Zepeda	81–77
6	"Battle Chili Peppers"	Gabriela Cámara	Yia Vang	Hmong cuisine	Chili Peppers (Secret Ingredient)	Gabriela Cámara	86–81
7	"Battle Live Sturgeon"	Ming Tsai	Gregory Gourdet and Mei Lin		Live Sturgeon (Secret Ingredient)	Ming Tsai	86–85
8	"Battle for Iron Legend"	All 5 Iron Chefs	Esther Choi		Sea (Secret Ingredient)	Iron Chefs	83–82

== Production ==
In January 2022, Netflix announced that it would reboot the Iron Chef franchise with a new iteration subtitled Quest for an Iron Legend for eight episodes, initially. The release date of June 15, 2022 was announced that May with Alton Brown returning to co-host the show with Kristen Kish and Mark Dacascos reprising as The Chairman.

Tsai, Samuelsson, Crenn, and Stone were previously challengers on Iron Chef America, with Tsai, Samuelsson, and Crenn having also competed on The Next Iron Chef. Samuelsson was also a challenger on the aborted Iron Chef USA pilot from 2001. Past Iron Chefs Masaharu Morimoto and Wolfgang Puck appear as guest judges during the first season. Morimoto was the third Iron Chef Japanese on the original Iron Chef and was one of the Iron Chefs on Iron Chef America, while Wolfgang Puck served as one of the Iron Chefs for the Iron Chef America: Battle of the Masters pilot miniseries before retiring.

== Reception ==
On the review aggregator website Rotten Tomatoes, 57% of 7 critics' reviews are positive, with an average rating of 5.8/10. Jim Vorel at Paste enjoyed the show appreciating the preserved balance of "patently absurd" and "undeniably impressive" from previous iterations. However, Wenlei Ma disagreed in her review for news.com.au feeling it lacked the weirdness of the original Iron Chef and was too polished, later calling it "soulless" and "not worthy of the Iron Chef name."
