= Dangerous Man Brewing Company =

Microbrewery in Minneapolis

- Type: Private
- Location: 610 Oak Ave N, Maple Lake, Minnesota, United States
- Opened: 2013
- Employees: 20
- Website: www.dangerousmanbrewing.com

Dangerous Man Brewing Company is a microbrewery previously located in the Sheridan neighborhood of Northeast Minneapolis.

After closing its taproom in 2023, Dangerous Man currently runs a brewing facility in Maple Lake, Minnesota, from which it distributes products to bars and liquor stores.

In March of 2025, Dangerous Man announced they would wind-down operations, distributing their final beer, the Last Call IIPA on March 25.

Five months after their closure, Dangerous Man announced they would be re-opening under new ownership while retaining founder, Rob Miller.

== Founding ==
Dangerous Man Brewing Company was founded by Rob Miller, a longtime homebrewer who had been considering opening a brewery for some time. After changes in Minnesota state law permitted brewery taprooms (and after additional changes in Minneapolis law allowed him to open a brewery across the street from a church) he located his brewery in a turn-of-the-twentieth-century building which was originally a bank. The brewery opened on January 25, 2013.

== Distribution ==
Dangerous Man did not distribute their beer until 2023, when they opened a production facility in Maple Lake, Minnesota.

In April 2015, Dangerous Man previously expanded their operation into an adjacent building to open a dedicated counter for growler and merchandise sales. The expansion was completed in November 2015, doubling the overall footprint of the brewery and triple their brewing capacity.

== Current use of previous space ==
Vinai, a restaurant by local chef Yia Vang, opened in the former Dangerous Man space in 2024.
