= Integration of Hmong people into urban society =

There are many destinations around the world for the Hmong diaspora. Hmong are living in Southeast Asia, China, the United States, France, and even Australia. The Hmong people, having fled Laos after the end of the Vietnam War in 1975, immigrated to these places in hopes of a fresh start. However, this mass exodus was not a smooth transition due to the very different lifestyle the Hmong people were accustomed to.

== Lifestyle of the Hmong in Southeast Asia ==
Hmong people living in Southeast Asia were subsistence farmers who, according to James C. Scott of Yale University, practiced "escape agriculture" in efforts of trying to flee states that were trying to conquer them. These practices of "escape agriculture" usually produced yields such as maize, millet, root crops, opium, and other highland crops which were carried out by swidden agriculture otherwise known as slash-and-burn agriculture. The Hmong had practiced this lifestyle for centuries. Agriculture was very much a part of everyday life for the Hmong community and so transitioning from an agrarian society to a more industrialized and urban society was challenging for them.

== Urban gardens ==
After immigrating to the United States after the Vietnam War, studies of Hmong women showed that many of them still practiced agriculture similar to that of when they were back in Southeast Asia. These "urban gardens" have become reconstructions of their former gardens. Although the gardens are no longer an essential part of everyday life, they still provide a way for Hmong refugees, especially women, to continue the practice of gardening and provide some fresh vegetables for their families. A study in Sacramento, California showed that out of 73 kinds of plants that were harvested and grown, 38 were used for food, 36 were used for medicine, three were used as ornaments and one of them was used for fiber. Many of these plants, however, had multiple purposes with 15 being used for both food and medicine, one being used as food and an ornament, one being used as medicine and for fiber, and one being used for food, medicine, and for fiber. Many of these plants were also used as food seasonings and additives primarily for chicken. All the Hmong women who were a part of this study were interviewed afterwards as to why they do what they do. Many of these same plants can be purchased at Asian markets in Sacramento and yet they choose to grow them themselves. The Hmong women's response was that it would be easier, more convenient, and more economical to grow their own crops. These agricultural techniques and way of living were passed down to them by their parents and grandparents back in Laos and as a result these are the few skills that they have available to them. After the Hmong immigrated to Sacramento, many of the Hmong women did not work and did not speak English and often sat alone at home in their apartments. This created challenges that got in the way of them understanding the American urban culture that was being forced upon. These "urban gardens" provided Hmong women the opportunity to utilize their skills where they could be productive and be valued for their work. This allowed Hmong women, especially elders, to overcome feelings of overdependence and uselessness. Not only that, this revealed a change that could be made to help Hmong people adapt and adjust to living in urban cities in the United States.

== Inter-ethnic political conflict in the United States ==
=== Political movements regarding resettlement after the Vietnam War ===
The actions of the U.S. military and the C.I.A. brought the Hmong into the war in Vietnam but in losing the fight they had left the Hmong behind. They could only afford to evacuate General Vang Pao and those who they thought the Pathet Lao would target. The United States did little to nothing to aid the Hmong trapped in Laos after 1975. Those that managed to flee to Thailand and become refugees immigrated to the United States. This has harvested bitterness that the Hmong immigrants have towards the American public which is unaware of the sacrifices that the Hmong people made for the United States. In order to somewhat alleviate some of the stress on Hmong people in the United States the U.S. Congress have modified the requirements for becoming a U.S. citizen for Hmong immigrants who are not proficient in English and know almost nothing about U.S. history and civics. Congress also passed the Hmong Veterans Naturalization Act (HVNA) in May 2000 although prior to the vote to pass the act, almost 2000 Hmong veterans participated in a rally in Washington D.C. In addition, July 22 was also declared to be Lao-Hmong Recognition Day to honor the sacrifices made by those during the war in Southeast Asia. Although the Hmong people have won all of these political battles it has arrived about 25 years too late to really influence resettlement after the war. Furthermore, there are still Hmong people in Laos hiding from the Laotian army. In 2003, two European journalists and a Hmong American interpreter managed to find about 600 Hmong soldiers and their families who were hiding from the Laotian army. The Hmong in hiding believed that the Americans were going to come back for them. Many of them were children and were not even alive when the Americans were still in Laos.

=== Racism ===
The Hmong people have experienced not only hardships in trying to integrate themselves into a new society but also faced hostility and racism from Americans in their communities. In the mid 1970s, before the arrival Hmong immigrants, the small towns of Eau Claire, Wisconsin and Rochester, Minnesota were nearly one hundred percent white. However, the arrival of Hmong refugees did not immediately spark hatred and hostility. As a matter of fact, local churches welcomed the refugees with open arms and provided basic necessities, taught the Hmong English, and helped them find jobs. However, despite the best efforts of the church and good Samaritans, the Hmong refugees have come to experience hate from the locals. Prejudice is common in many small Midwestern cities. This has been verified by an antiracism group in Rochester known as Building Equality Together who conducted a survey in Olmsted County where Rochester in located. The survey found that many locals had "distorted attitudes" about minorities. About forty percent believed that Southeast Asians did not maintain their properties as well as the whites and would rather have minimal contact between whites and minorities. Another survey was conducted in the La Crosse area of Wisconsin which also showed prejudice towards minorities. As much as forty-three percent opposed or strongly opposed the arrival of any more Hmong refugees because they were hurting the welfare system and taking jobs away from the locals and contributing to unemployment. A similar survey in Wausau displayed similar results where forty-seven percent of the residents felt that the quality of life had decreased since the arrival of Hmong refugees.

Cases of racism escalated to absurd accusations of Hmong people stealing dogs to eat which was a well-documented stereotype of Asians among whites. Accounts of racial discrimination were even reported at public schools where a teacher in Eau Claire reported that the Hmong, "have been accused of eating dogs and have received obscene and threatening phone calls. Their children have been harassed and even beaten." Housing discrimination was also quite prevalent in Eau Claire where white landlords would lie about a unit"s availability or explicitly say that they do not rent to Hmong people.

== Kidnapping for marriage ==
In January 1987, a local newspaper in Eau Claire began circulating about a "marriage-by-theft" case in La Crosse. The news article reported that a Hmong man had "abducted" and "impregnated" a Hmong woman against her will after obtaining permission from her parents to marry her. It is customary that this "kidnapping" takes place for Hmong marriages. Viewed as primitive and violent by the Americans this issue sparked many conflicts involving moral values and cultural customs. The Hmong wanted to preserve this custom because they did not want to lose a part of their culture, thus condemning them to becoming simply another minority whose customs are lost and stuck in poverty and illiteracy. Although these incidents have caused cultural disorder, the crime rates in Eau Claire have hardly been affected and the social control of the dominant group, the local whites, were not undermined. This is just another example of the difficulty Hmong people face integrating their culture within a new society.

== Hmong involvement and integration with politics ==
Despite all of this controversy, the Hmong community in Eau Claire not only endured but began to thrive. The Hmong have demonstrated involvement in the local politics which overthrew the stereotypes of Asian Americans being very acquiescent and passive. Charles Vue, the very first Hmong graduate from the University of Wisconsin—Eau Claire became the first Hmong person to run for political office in the city. He ran for a seat on the Eau Claire School Board in 1993. Three years later, Joe Bee Xiong won the third seat out of seven on the city council and easily won reelection two years later. Xiong declined to run a third time but coached Neng Lee who won the fourth seat out of seven on the council. After finishing his term, Lee declined to run for reelection, however, a grocery store owner by the name of Saidang Xiong won the second seat out of out eight possible candidates. In 2001, Kaxing Xiong became the first Hmong principal of a Wisconsin public school. These achievements could not have been possible without the votes of the native-born voters because at the time there were not enough Hmong voters to ensure electoral victory. Integration and participation of the Hmong people in Eau Claire not only included the politics but religion as well. In 1980, the first Christian church service in the Hmong language was held. It was led by an assistant Hmong pastor and numbered over 250 individuals who attended. The Hmong community also appointed leaders to each clan who would oversee problems within the community and help resolve them. The organization of social structure within the Hmong community and open participation within the overall community helped the Hmong transition into the urban, American way of life. They had achieved what the locals had thought was impossible.

== Integration into society and kinship ==
Although the Hmong have forsaken many aspects of their previous lifestyle such as swidden agriculture and living in rural areas, they still retain strong kinship with one another. These kin relationships allow the Hmong to quickly respond to changing conditions such as moving to urban cities. That is due to the nature of Hmong kinships. They generally consist of immediate family members those of direct lineage. Hmong kinship is also strongly connected spiritually to their ancestors meaning the power of clan membership transcends death itself. Much of the Hmong kinship and politics are operated by the Lao Family Community which is a social service organization in St. Paul-Minneapolis which also has ties to other Hmong leadership groups throughout the nation. Since 1977, whenever networks of Hmong assistance organizations have come together in large concentrations of Hmong refugees such as St. Paul-Minneapolis, there has been speculation about their true agenda. These speculations may have the wrong intentions because these associations simply want to provide a wide variety of services to the Hmong refugees. Assistance organizations such as the Lao Family Community are there to provide leadership and aid in resolving conflicts within the Hmong community. The creation of these organizations in order to elect leaders is, in a way, establishing self-identity and self-autonomy within urban areas where the Hmong can look for guidance. It creates assurance and a sense of belongingness that the Hmong people need to feel comfortable in a new setting. It is due to these factors that the Hmong have been able to adjust to living in these urban areas which are so different from the agrarian society they originate from.

== Cited works ==
- Corlett, Jan L.; Dean, Ellen A.; Grivetti, Louis E. (2003). "Hmong Gardens: Botanical Diversity in an Urban Setting". Economic Botany. 57 (3). Springer: 374–378. doi:10.1663/0013-0001(2003)057[0365:HGBDIA]2.0.CO;2. JSTOR 4256705. S2CID 28563603.
- Dunnigan, Timothy (1982). "Segmentary Kinship in an Urban Society: The Hmong of St. Paul-Minneapolis". Anthropological Quarterly. 55 (3). Washington, D.C.: The George Washington University Institute for Ethnographic Research.: 126–132. doi:10.2307/3318022. JSTOR 3318022.
- Hein, Jeremy (2006). "Chapter 4: Hmong". Ethnic Origins: The Adaptation of Cambodian and Hmong Refugees in Four American Cities. New York: Russell Sage Foundation. pp. 61–75. ISBN 0-87154-336-2.
- Scott, James C. (2009). The Art of Not Being Governed. New Haven, Conn.: Yale University Press. pp. 194–195. ISBN 978-0-300-15228-9.
