= Hmong American Farmers Association =

- Founded: 2011
- Location: Minnesota, U.S.

The Hmong American Farmers Association (HAFA) is a nonprofit organization founded in 2011 by a group of Hmong American farming families in Minnesota. The association was established to advance the prosperity of Hmong farmers through cooperative efforts, capacity building, and advocacy. The founders believed that the best way to support Hmong farmers was by having Hmong farmers themselves lead the change in response to challenges they face in the food system.

HAFA manages a 155-acre farm in Dakota County, near the Twin Cities, where its member families lease land to grow vegetables, fruits, and flowers. This farm acts as an incubator where farmers can develop their agricultural skills and business practices. The association also operates a food hub that aggregates produce from its members and sells it through community-supported agriculture shares, schools, retailers, and other institutions.

Since its founding, HAFA has grown to include over 100 farmers, helping them develop profitable and sustainable farming businesses in the Minnesota area.

== History ==
HAFA was established after Hmong farmers faced repeated challenges securing stable land access. Many Hmong growers had decades of experience but worked under short-term leases that made planning and investment in the land difficult. Some faced displacement from rented plots, threatening their livelihoods. HAFA leaders recognized that building intergenerational wealth required ownership rather than year-to-year leases. The association envisioned creating an incubator farm to provide long-term, predictable access to agricultural land close to the Twin Cities, where many Hmong farmers sell their produce.

In 2013, HAFA began leasing the Dakota County property through a social investor who bought the land with an understanding that HAFA would eventually acquire it. The arrangement was structured through a 10-year lease with a right-to-purchase agreement, and HAFA’s leadership had to navigate Minnesota’s corporate farming laws, which restrict non-family groups from owning farmland. To proceed, HAFA successfully applied for an exemption from the state Commissioner of Agriculture.

HAFA sought grants, partnerships, and community fundraising to make the eventual purchase feasible. The organization also benefited from Dakota County’s agricultural conservation easement program, which limits land development rights to preserve farmland and makes properties more affordable for agricultural use.

The final purchase in 2022 was made possible by $2 million in state bonding funds approved in 2020, alongside grants, community donations, and support from farmland access programs. HAFA leaders emphasized that owning the land would secure long-term access for over 100 farmers, helping them build stability and wealth while continuing traditional and sustainable farming practices.(1) The land purchase in Dakota County marked a major accomplishment after a decade-long effort to secure long-term farmland for Hmong farmers in Minnesota. The 155-acre property, located along U.S. Highway 52 in Vermillion Township, became the first Hmong nonprofit-owned and operated farm in the United States.

=== Threat from county road project ===
Shortly after HAFA's 2022 purchase of 155 acres in Dakota County, Dakota County officials proposed a new road interchange at Highway 52 and County Road 66 that threatened to condemn up to 20 acres of HAFA’s farmland, which would have displaced several farmers who had invested heavily in their plots. This proposal caused significant concern among HAFA members and community leaders who viewed it as inconsistent with the state’s prior support for HAFA’s land acquisition. In response, the Minnesota Legislature acted in 2023 by including protective language in the state bonding bill that prohibited any level of government from taking or condemning HAFA-owned land without the organization's consent. Authored by Representative Fue Lee, this legislation secured HAFA’s farmland and effectively ended the road project threat. Although Dakota County later deemed the interchange project too costly and stopped its planning, the law continues to safeguard HAFA’s land, ensuring long-term stability for the farmers.
