= Nilou Motamed =

Iranian-American magazine editor and TV personality

Nilou Motamed (Persian: نیلو معتمد; born April 19, 1971) is an Iranian-born American magazine editor and television personality. She is a recurring judge on the television series Iron Chef. Motamed is the former editor-in-chief of Food & Wine magazine and Condé Nast's Epicurious.

== Early life ==
Motamed was born in Tehran and spent her childhood in Iran. Her family fled to Paris after the Iranian Revolution, then to New York when she was a teenager. She attended Binghamton University in upstate New York and studied at the Sorbonne in Paris, earning dual degrees in Political Science and Philosophy. Motamed is fluent in four languages: English, French, Spanish, and Persian.

== Career ==
In 2000, Motamed joined the staff at Travel + Leisure as associate editor; she was soon promoted to food editor and ultimately to features director and senior correspondent.

For 14 years Motamed also directed Travel + Leisure's culinary and restaurants coverage. She was the instigator of the magazine's annual "Food & Travel" issue, along with the "Eat Like a Local" special. Her Travel + Leisure food coverage was nominated for eight James Beard Foundation Journalism Awards.

In collaboration with CNN, she created Travel + Leisure's "Eat Like a Local" special, combining print, digital, social, and broadcast in a global food platform. She has hosted several TV series, including the restaurant review show Reservations Required and Travel Channel's undercover series Travel Spies, appearing on outlets ranging from CNN to NBC's Today and CBS This Morning.

In 2013, Motamed was named editor-in-chief of Epicurious, Condé Nast's digital food site. In 2015, she became the first-ever Director of Inspiration for Conrad Hotels & Resorts, where she reimagined the guest experience and concierge programs for 24 luxury hotel properties around the globe Motamed created and curated the brand's "1/3/5" collection of local experiences.

In 2016, Motamed took charge of Time Inc.'s Food & Wine, overseeing editorial operations and content for an audience of more than 12 million. As editor-in-chief, Motamed managed all of F&W's tentpole franchises and partnerships, including the annual Best New Chefs showcase and the millennial food site FWx.

Beginning with Season 5 in 2008, Motamed has appeared often as a guest on Bravo's award-winning series Top Chef. For Season 16, set in Kentucky, she took on a more official role as recurring judge.

== Recognition ==
Motamed has been a panelist for the James Beard Foundation Restaurant and Chef Awards since 2007. She has been profiled in The New York Times. and was named one of AdWeek's "30 Most Influential People in Food".

== Personal life ==
Motamed met her husband magazine journalist Peter Jon Lindberg in 2000 while both were working at Travel + Leisure magazine.
