= Vinai (restaurant) =

Restaurant in Minneapolis, Minnesota, U.S.

- Interactive map of Vinai

Restaurant information
- Food type: Hmong
- Location: 1300 NE 2nd Street, Minneapolis, Minnesota, 55413, United States
- Coordinates: 45°00′04″N 93°15′59″W

Vinai is a restaurant in Minneapolis, Minnesota. It serves Hmong cuisine. The business was included in The New York Times's 2024 list of the 50 best restaurants in the United States.
