= Ban Vinai Refugee Camp =

Refugee camp in Thailand from 1975 until 1992

Coordinates: 17°55′50″N 101°54′51″E

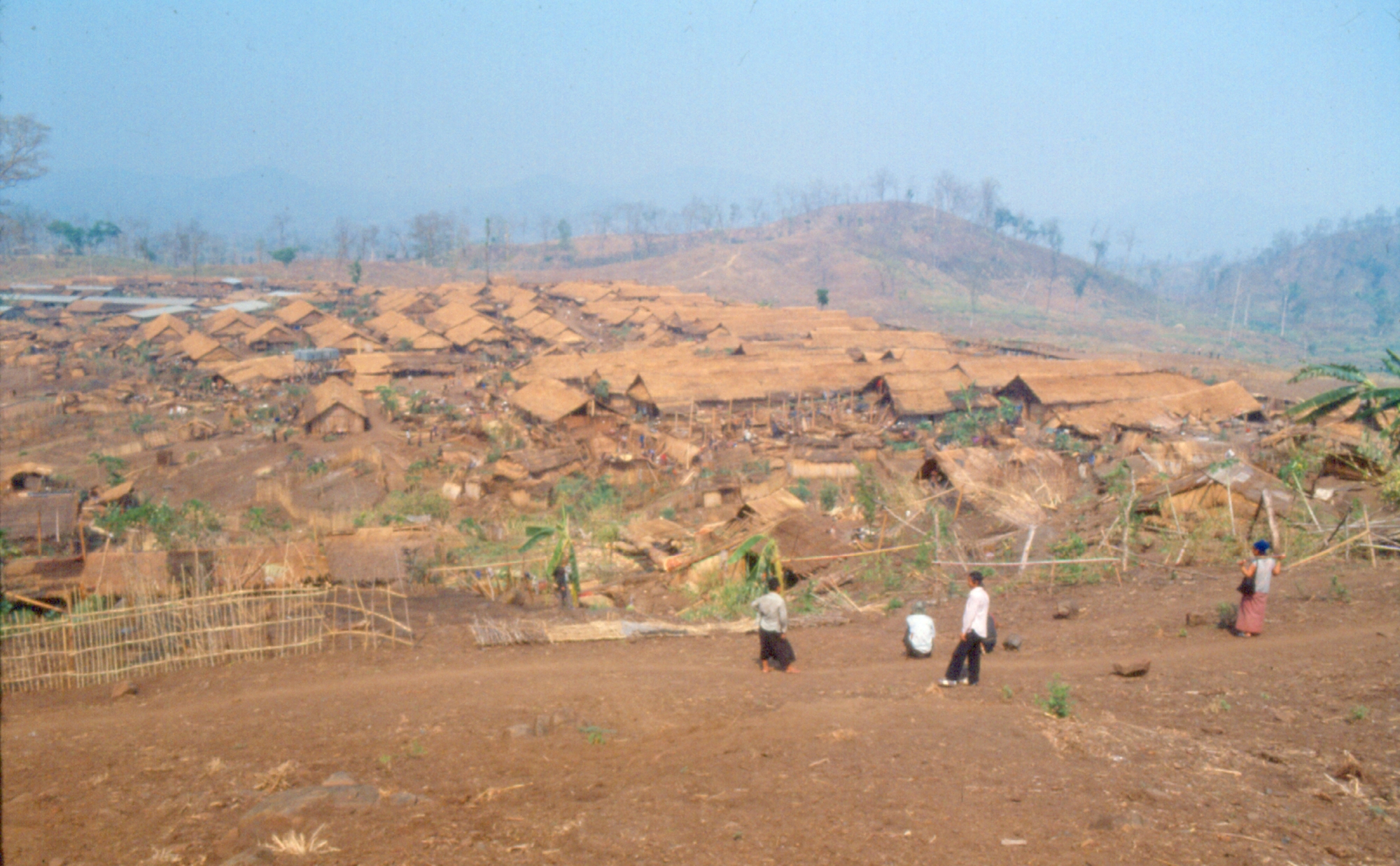
Ban Vinai refugee camp circa 1980-1991

Ban Vinai Refugee Camp, officially the Ban Vinai Holding Center, was a refugee camp in Thailand from 1975 until 1992. Ban Vinai primarily housed highland people, especially Hmong who fled the Hmong genocide in Laos. Ban Vinai had a maximum population of about 45,000 Hmong and other highland people. Many of the highland Lao were resettled in the United States and other countries. Many others lived in the camp for years which came to resemble a crowded and large Hmong village. The Royal Thai Government closed the camp in 1992, forced some of the inhabitants to return to Laos and removed the rest of them to other refugee camps.

== Origins ==
In May 1975, soldiers of the communist Pathet Lao and North Vietnamese Army captured Long Tieng, the headquarters of Hmong General Vang Pao and his 30,000 man CIA-supported army which had fought against the communists for nearly 15 years. Vang Pao and other Hmong leaders were evacuated to Thailand by the CIA's Jerry Daniels, and American civilian pilots. They took refuge in Nam Phong Military Camp. Vang Pao and a few others were soon permitted to come to the United States. In the wake of the evacuation, tens of thousands of Hmong, mostly former soldiers and their families, fled Laos by foot during the next few years, crossing the Mekong River into Thailand. While the fate of the Hmong remained uncertain, on August 8, 1975 Colonel Xay Dang Xiong (died 3-15-18) and his 80 volunteers were commissioned by the Interior Ministry of Thailand to clear a small forest in Pak Chom district to build the temporary refuge for asylum seekers. The team named the area Vinai to depict their loyalty and orderly manner. By late October, about 4,000 occupants mostly families of the initial were transferred from Nam Phong Military Camp to Ban Vinai. An official record stated that Ban Vinai was created in December 1975 to house the influx, hosting an initial population of 12,000 refugees. The CIA reportedly contributed several million dollars to build and run the camp.

== Description ==
The site of Ban Vinai is located in northeastern Thailand in Pak Chom district of Loei province, about 10 miles (16 km) south of the Mekong River and the border with Laos. The camp covered about 400 acres (160 ha) and was crowded with makeshift shacks built by the refugees themselves, plus administration buildings, dormitories, warehouses, health care centers, and other facilities. Ban Vinai had the appearance of an overgrown Hmong village, albeit seriously overcrowded.

The population of Ban Vinai remained around 12,000 until 1979 when it climbed rapidly as a result of an increased flow of Hmong from Laos. By 1985, the population reached a peak of about 45,000 people. Ninety-five percent were Hmong, but other ethnic groups represented included the Htin (Phai people), Yao (Mien), Lu, Khmu, Lao Theung, Tai Dam, Musor (Lahu), Haw (Hani), and lowland Lao.

The camp commander was a Thai, chosen by the provincial government and the Thai Ministry of Interior which oversaw the camp. Originally, (between 1976 and 1979) the camp was divided into five sectors, each with a refugee leader who together formed the Refugee Committee. In 1979, when the refugee camp at Nong Khai was closed by the Thai government, sectors 6th, 7th, and 8th were added to create more space for those refugees coming from Nong Khai camp. Sector 9th was known to the refugee camps in the Ban Vinai as the eternal sectors for those who died in the camp. Later in the mid 1980s when the refugee camp at Nom Yau was closed, sector 9th was created by building on top of the dead. The United Nations High Commissioner for Refugees (UNHCR), with donations from the United States and other countries, funded most assistance to the refugees, including food, housing, education, and health. More than a dozen international charitable non-governmental organizations worked in the camp implementing programs and running facilities on behalf of UNHCR, other donors, and the refugees.

== Resettlement, repatriation, and closure of the camp ==
Initially, all the refugees in Ban Vinai were granted temporary asylum in Thailand with the expectation that they would either soon return to Laos or be resettled in a third country. Thailand refused to grant Hmong the right to remain in Thailand permanently. However, in the 1980s, many refugees refused to return to Laos and did not seek resettlement to the United States or other countries. They demanded instead that the Lao government guarantee their safe return to Laos and autonomy. Some of the reluctance of the Hmong to resettle was fear of the challenges of moving to an industrial society. In Ban Vinai, the Hmong were able to maintain a semblance of their traditional culture and society. Reluctance was also based on the reported influence of Vang Pao and other leaders urging them to remain in Thailand as a prelude for a return to Laos and the overthrow of the communist government. Some of the Hmong used Ban Vinai as a base for resistance to the government of Laos. The reluctance to resettle began to change in 1985. A younger generation of Hmong was willing to adopt new customs and lifestyles and the Thai government was pressuring refugees to accept resettlement or to be forcibly repatriated to Laos. By 1986, the average length of time residents had lived in the camp was nearly seven years.

The government of Thailand initiated a program called "humane deterrence" to make life more difficult for refugees and to discourage additional refugees from coming to Thailand. In 1983, Thailand closed Ban Vinai to new arrivals, although several thousand Hmong were able to slip into the camp during the next several years. In 1985, the Thai began to "push back" Hmong and other Lao attempting to cross the border into Thailand and began forcible repatriation of Hmong from Ban Vinai to Laos. Human rights organizations opposed the forced repatriation and cited evidence in 1987 that returnees were arrested upon their return to Laos. To placate the Thai government and reduce the forced repatriations and "push backs" of Hmong refugees, the U.S. government doubled its quota for resettlement of Lao, including Hmong, from 4,000 to 8,000 annually in early 1988.

After several years of increased resettlement of Hmong abroad, declining numbers of new refugees, and repatriations to Laos. Thailand closed Ban Vinai Refugee Camp at the end of 1992. The remaining Hmong and Lao refugees in Thailand were distributed to other camps and refugee centers, notably Wat Tham Krabok.

== Notable people ==
- Yia Vang, Hmong American chef born in the camp. He runs a restaurant called Vinai, named after the refugee camp.
- May Lee-Yang, Hmong American poet and playwright born in the camp
- Kao Kalia Yang, Hmong American author born in the camp
- Mai Xiong, a businesswoman and politician serving for District 13 in the Michigan House of Representatives. She is the first Hmong American to serve in the Michigan legislature.
