= Denzil Angus Carty =

African American Episcopal priest and civil rights activist

- Born: March 30, 1904; St. John's, Antigua
- Died: August 24, 1975 (aged 71)
- Monuments: Carty Park
- Education: City College of New York; General Theological Seminary; Wayne State University
- Employer: St. Philip's Episcopal Church

Denzil Angus Carty (March 30, 1904 – August 24, 1975) was an American civil rights leader and a priest in the Episcopal Church. He advocated for fair housing and against discrimination, primarily in St. Paul, Minnesota.

== Early life and education ==
Denzil Angus Carty was born on March 30, 1904, in St. John's, Antigua. He attended primary and secondary school in the New York City Public School System, and completed a bachelor's degree at the City College of New York and a bachelor of divinity degree from General Theological Seminary in New York. He did graduate work at Xavier University; earned a master of arts degree in psychology at Wayne State University; and eventually graduated from the Episcopal seminary in 1934.

== Military service and early career ==
Over the course of the 1930s, Carty worked in three parishes across New York City: All Souls' Church, St. Philip's Episcopal Church, and the Church of St. Luke in the Fields. The dancer Donald McKayle was among Carty's congregants at St. Luke's. In 1944, Carty entered the U.S. Military and served as a chaplain and captain of the 512th Port Battalion in Europe. He served until 1946.

Carty then worked as a principal at Weber Elementary School in Baldwin, Michigan, before coming to Minnesota in 1950. There, he became rector of St. Philip's Episcopal Church where he served until his retirement in 1975.

== St. Philip's Episcopal Church and activism ==
St. Philip's Episcopal Church was a primarily Black congregation in the Summit-University neighborhood of St. Paul, Minnesota. In 1955, Carty oversaw the construction of a new building for the church after its 1905 structure at 457 Mackubin Street was demolished.

While rector at St. Philip's, Carty was involved in numerous church-related groups and committees. He was director of the Episcopal Society for Cultural and Racial Unity and was one of the founders of the Christian Social Relations Department in the Minnesota Episcopal diocese, where he served as vice chair and director. In these roles he advocated for training for civil rights leaders and also participated in actions such as negotiating with St. Paul construction trade unions and employers to increase the number of African American construction workers, and advocated for the desegregation of St. Paul public schools.

He was also active in other civic and political groups outside of the church. He served as chair of the Minnesota conference of the NAACP: as president, Carty took part in a campaign to persuade University of Minnesota Vice President W.T. Middlebrook to include an anti-discrimination clause in a property sales contract. He was also director of the St. Paul Urban Coalition and president of the St. Paul Urban League; chairman of the Minnesota Council for Civil and Human Rights; chaplain for the American Legion; and a board member of the Hallie Q. Brown Community Center and the Children's Home Society. In addition, he was active in the Minnesota Council of Churches; the Minnesota Jewish Council; and Fair Employment Practices Commission.

In 1961, Carty lobbied in front of the Minnesota legislature for the passage of the Minnesota Fair Housing Act, which aimed to prevent housing discrimination. The bill passed and went into effect in 1962. In 1963, Carty was part of a 58-person contingent from Minnesota to attend the March on Washington for Jobs and Freedom in Washington, D.C. The following year, in 1964, Carty led a "prayer intercession" at the Minnesota state capitol building in support of the Civil Rights Act of 1964. The action brought together an audience of about 300 people who were called to encourage their senators to pass the bill.

During his career, Carty worked closely with Jeannette Piccard, the first female Episcopal priest, at St. Philip's and supported her ordination. In 1973, at the General Convention, a proposal to recognize female priests had been struck down, and in July 1974, Carty escorted Piccard and other members of the Philadelphia Eleven as they were ordained. Piccard became the first female Episcopal priest in the nation and the church recognized her ordination in 1977.

== Personal life ==
Carty was married to Sylvia O. Carty, who was also a civic and community activist and was Director of Day Care at the Hallie Q. Brown Community Center. They had three daughters.

In 1957, Carty was initiated into the Kappa Alpha Psi fraternity and was an active member of the St. Paul-Minneapolis (MN) Alumni chapter.

== Awards and legacy ==
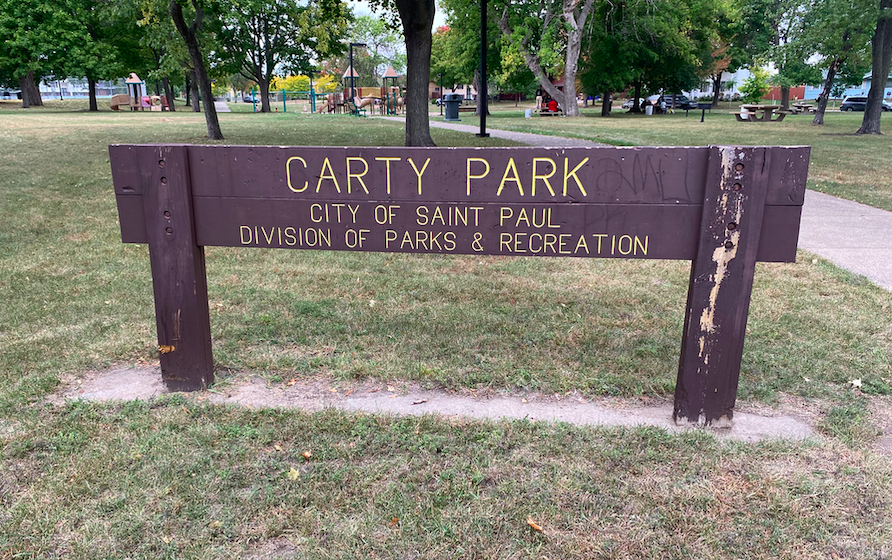
Carty Park in St. Paul

In 1973, Carty was awarded the Liberty Bell Award by the Ramsey County Bar Association, which honors non-lawyers who have made contributions to the broader understanding of the law.

In 1975, Carty Park at Iglehart Avenue and St. Albans Street in St. Paul was named after Reverend Carty following his death that year. The first "I Remember Rondo Day Celebration" was held in Carty Park, which celebrated the residents of the historically Black neighborhood of Rondo.

In 2007, the senior living facility Carty Heights opened in the Lexington-Hamline neighborhood of St. Paul, named for Reverend Carty.

Beginning in 2011, Holy Trinity Episcopal Church, in St. Paul Minnesota, celebrated Father Carty's birthday annually on March 30. Holy Trinity was founded in 2012 following the merger of St. Philip's Episcopal Church and St. Thomas Episcopal Church, another predominant Black Episcopal congregation in Minneapolis, back in 2008. In 2015, the 78th General Convention of the Episcopal Church in the United States passed Resolution C006 to include Carty in Holy Women, Holy Men, a liturgical commemoration of the saints.
