= Summit-University, Saint Paul =

Summit-University
- Neighborhood
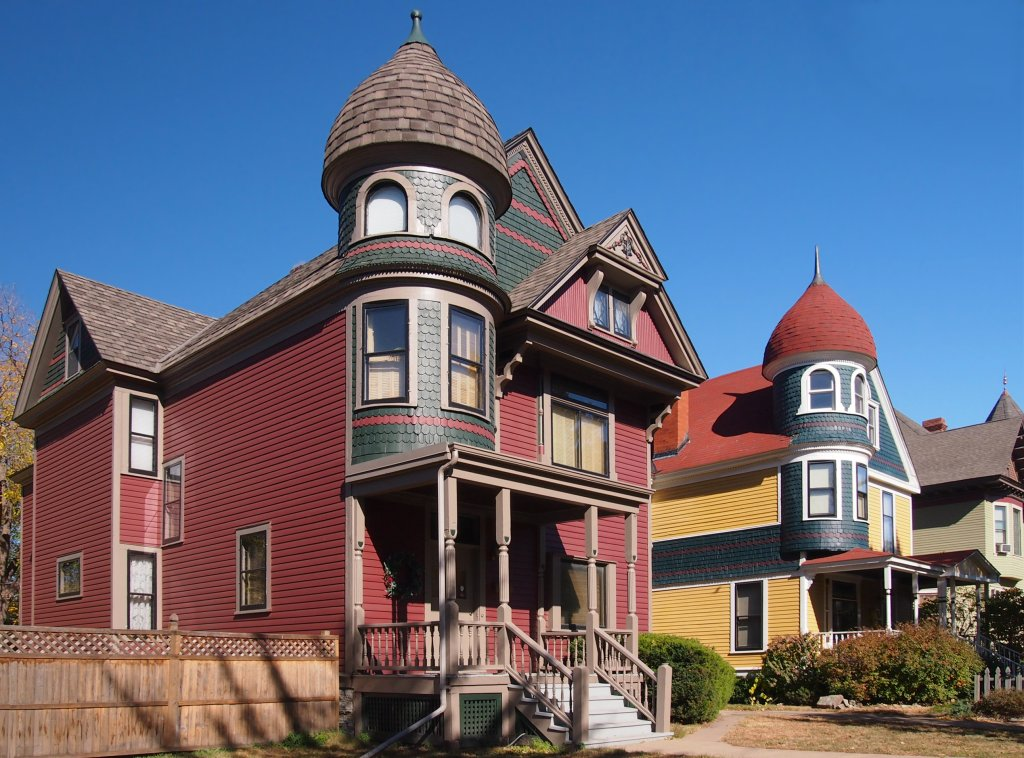
- Houses in the Woodland Park District of Summit-University.
- Nicknames: Cathedral Hill, Rondo
- Coordinates: 44°57′6″N 93°7′35″W
- Country: United States
- State: Minnesota
- County: Ramsey
- City: Saint Paul

Population (2010)
  - Total: 18,707
- Time zone: UTC-6 (CST)
  - Summer (DST): UTC-5 (CDT)
- Area code: 651
- Website: https://www.summit-university.org/

Summit-University is a neighborhood in Saint Paul, Minnesota, United States, that stretches roughly from University Avenue in the north, Lexington Parkway to the west, Summit Avenue to the south and to the east along John Ireland Boulevard, Kellogg Boulevard and Marion Street. Summit-University, Selby-Dale, St. Anthony Hill, Cathedral Hill, Woodland Park, Crocus Hill, Ramsey Hill, Hill District, Historic Hill District, Uni-Dale, North Quadrant, and Central Village all refer to parts of the neighborhood that is broadly known as Summit-University.

The neighborhood is an ethnically and economically diverse community. In 1983 the neighborhood was home to Saint Paul's largest concentration of minority residents. Among the many groups living in Summit-University are the Hmong community as well as the city's other Asian communities, of whom Vietnamese, Laotians and Cambodians are represented in large numbers. Summit-University also includes the historic Cathedral Hill neighborhood, as well as what remains of "old Rondo" - a former neighborhood of the city. Rondo was the center of Saint Paul's African-American community since the Civil War, but was broken apart by the construction of Interstate 94 in the 1960s. Famous Summit-University natives include baseball great Dave Winfield. Writer F. Scott Fitzgerald was born in this neighborhood, although he is generally associated with the Summit Hill neighborhood where he later lived.

== Early history ==
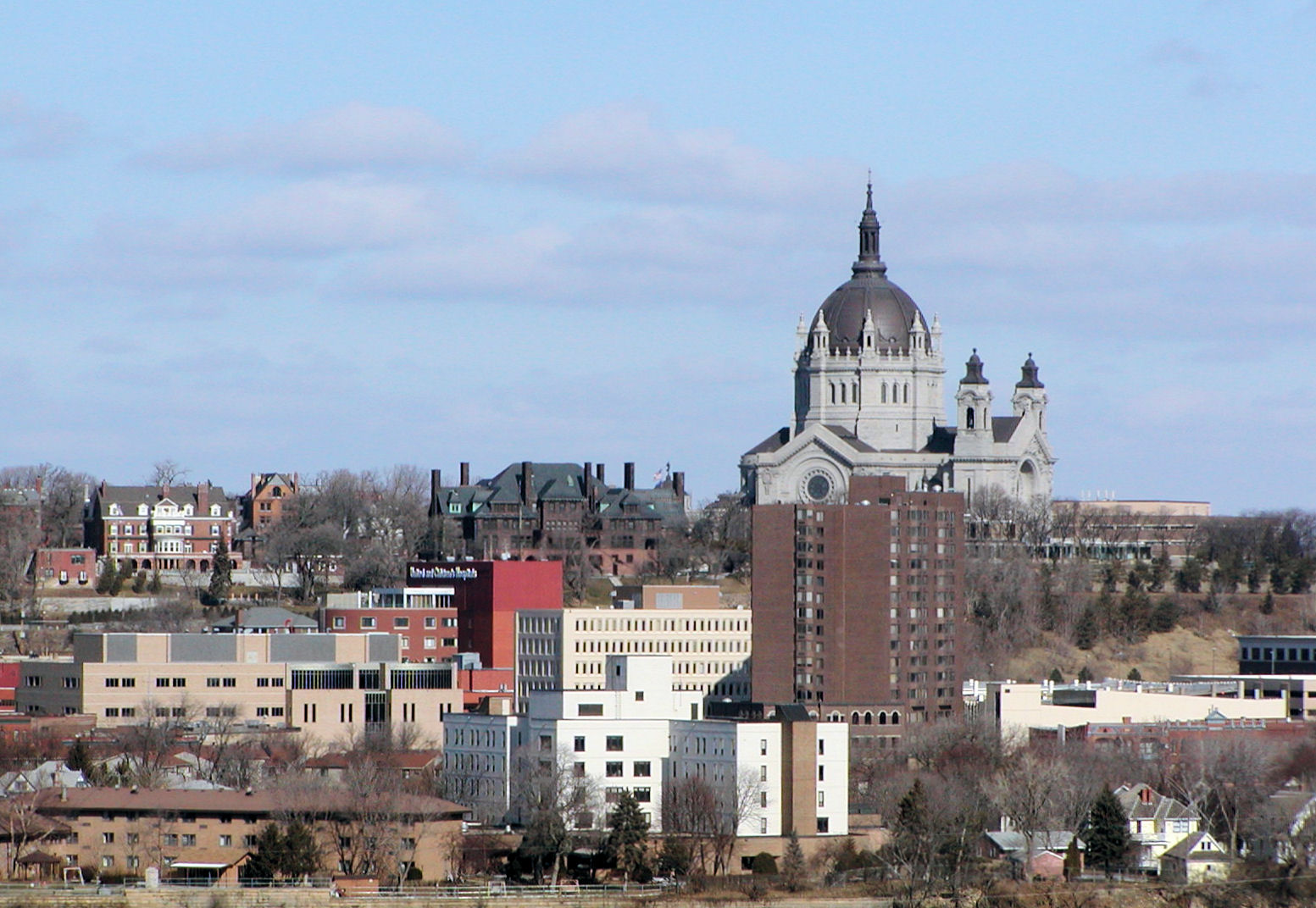
Hill by Summit Avenue showing the James J. Hill House and Cathedral

The neighborhood was settled in the 1880s and 1890s with duplexes and apartment building settled alongside mansions. Early development of the area was limited due to the steep slopes of Summit and Ramsey hills. By the 1880s a portion of Summit-University had become the neighborhood in Saint Paul, after streetcar service made it accessible. Not all of Summit-University was populated by the rich, but the neighborhood was always middle class or better. The best housing was along the southern and eastern edges. Closer to University Avenue the housing was less grand. The whole area was predominately residential. Neighborhood stores were located along the streetcar routes but little industry intruded.

For decades Summit-University was protected from downtown encroachment by the physical barricade of the bluff, and by the pace of downtown development. With the advent of easy automobile travel in the 1920s, the city's elite began moving away from the neighborhood. The great mansions along Summit Avenue and Crocus Hill declined somewhat but were not subdivided allowed to decay as were similar areas in many American cities. This genteel area of the neighborhood's southern and eastern fringe helped preserve it. The Saint Paul Pioneer Press claimed the Hill District was the “largest solid home community” in the country in the early 1930s.

== Decline ==
External image
- Summit-University neighborhood in 1923. Note the density of buildings.

The northern fringe provided another sort of anchor. Since the 1880s, Saint Paul's small black community had lived along the railroad corridors slightly north of Summit-University. By the beginning of urban renewal, the section of the city with a concentrated black population was still small by big city standards, but concentrated. Expansion to the north was effectively blocked by the rail corridor, and the dislocations of the Eastern and Western redevelopment projects and freeway construction in the 1950s and 1960s drove African Americans into parts of the Summit-University neighborhood. Houses were subdivided and fell into disrepair as their white owners participated in the national "white flight" era, moving west into newer city neighborhoods or to the suburbs. Some houses and businesses were abandoned. Selby Avenue, the commercial heart of the district, became increasingly deteriorated. The wealthy homes originally for the white elite then housed lower income residents. Many of the homes were subdivided and in disrepair.

By the early 1950s Summit-University clearly had many of the classic signs of urban decay and disinvestment. Late in that decade Summit-University residents began to petition the city government for renewal. Those displaced in the renewal areas to the north and from the freeway construction places pressure on the area, and the ensuing deterioration obviously required some action. Planners, politicians and residents knew that Summit-University needed help, and considered urban renewal the answer. The community was the HRA's top priority after slum clearance projects then in progress were completed.

For more than a decade, major problems plagued renewal efforts in Summit-University despite the city's and residents’ determination to improve the area. Considerable conflict over the renewal arose between the city and HRA leaders on the one side, and community leaders on the other. These conflicts were intensified by the fact that community leaders came from three different sources. First there were the “professional” leaders – ministers and social agency workers. During the years of decline, the Summit-University acquired a number of social agencies including the Hallie Q. Brown Community Center, and local chapters of the Urban League and the NAACP, that continued to play an important part in the life and health of the area. Traditional black organizations and black ministers resisted the city's efforts to conduct renewal without the substantial resident involvement.

Businessmen comprised the second leadership group through their commercial clubs. The third group of leaders came out of indigenous citizen organizations. Often these groups formed in response to some unwanted city action. The Dale-Selby Action Council, for example, formed in the early 1960s to protest HRA plans to construct a public high rise for the elderly on the abandoned Neill School site on the corner of Laurel and Farrington. Residents felt the Neill playground was vital play space in a crowded neighborhood. The HRA built the high rise despite the protest but the organization survived and formed one core of resident power. Some of these organizations were funded by “War on Poverty” money from the federal government. Other citizen groups were formed by the middle-class residents who were beginning to try to restore old homes in the area.

== Urban renewal ==
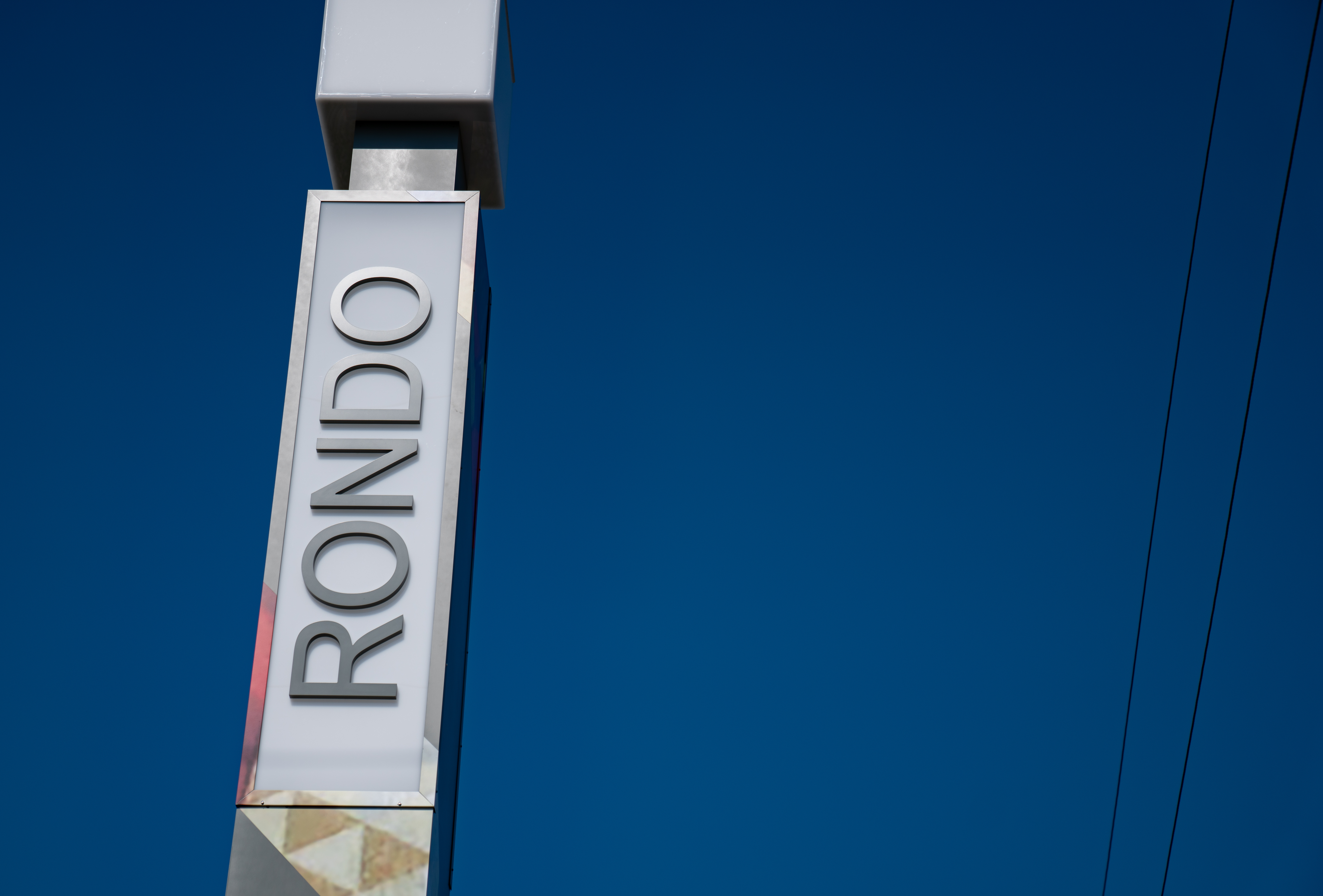
Rondo Commemorative Plaza sign

=== Early plans ===
The Cathedral project of the early 1960s was to have been the first stage of renewal of Summit-University. The HRA received a planning grant in 1962 partly in response to those displaced by the construction of I-94. The project area covered 282 acres and was to have been renewed in three stages, but only the first stage, comprising 48 acres, was achieved. Cathedral I had a specific client, the Saint Paul School Board, which proposed an unusual method of renewal. The board was looking for a site for a technical school, so the HRA clear an area alongside the Saint Paul Cathedral. The housing cleared was a mixture of aging single-family and multi-family dwelling that were not, by 1960s standards, worth saving. A decade later, with the rehabilitation craze in full swing, much of this housing stock would probably have been salvaged. The remained of the Cathedral project was later incorporated into the Summit-University project.

The first application for a planning grant for Summit-University (called Selby-Dale- at that point by the HRA) was denied by HUD. The federal officials felt that the HRA was unable to handle more projects until the Eastern and Western redevelopments were complete. By 1964 planning had finally begun under the conventional renewal rules (and with federal money). In 1966, an impressive covey of Saint Paul business, religious, labor, and governmental notables made a trip to Washington D.C. to lobby for approval. They were successful. At the time of its approval in 1969, the Summit-University project, as it was called by this time, was the largest neighborhood development project in the country. It totaled 1,034 acres and housed 21,700 residents.

But the divisions of the last decade had not been healed by the mission to Washington, D.C., and another legislative change provided a powerful mechanism for resident activism. No sooner had Summit-University been finally approved with the Model Cities Act was passed, which delayed the project. The act proposed to cure the perceived ills of urban renewal – already in much public disfavor – by giving residents a strong voice in the process and progress of renewal. Saint Paul planners considered Summit-University a logical place for this kind of Great Society social experiment given the wide mix of social groups, a history of effective community politics, and enough social and physical decay to interest the bureaucrats in Washington, D.C. the availability of more federal money provided a big incentive for an area to be declared a demonstration project for the Model Cities program. In Saint Paul this idea was pushed from two quarters: city government under the directions of Saint Paul Mayor Thomas R. Byrne, and community groups, led largely by black organizations and religious leaders, black and white. The program for the neighborhood began in 1969.

Another hiatus delayed renewal of Summit-University while officials from the HRA and Model Cities program fought over control of the renewal effort. They struggled over control of the federal money and the professional staff who would carry out renewal in the area. For more than two years, successive vituperative public meetings did little to resolve differences. Meanwhile, Neighborhood Development Program money was used to selectively clear substandard housing then in the neighborhood. In late 1969 HUD issued an ultimatum: the city had thirty days to decide how it would operate its Model Cities district. A compromise was worked out; the Model Cities Neighborhood Planning Committee would have some control over both money and staff, and the city government, through the HRA, would retain a share of the power. An uneasy, but functioning, partnership ensued.

=== Projects are implemented ===
By late 1970 the project was finally implemented, and redevelopment began in 1971. Arguments continued over clearance and relocation, especially within the black community. During the decade that the renewal project was being contested Summit-University became home to most of Saint Paul's black population, and now renewal efforts threatened many with another displacement. But renewal could not be stopped. By 1978 more than $32 million in direct aid had been spent on Summit-University. The Model Cities program ended in 1974, but the tradition of citizen involvement continued.

Summit-University is the Twin Cities’ best, and perhaps only, example of extensive gentrification. The considerable public expenditures during and after renewal formed the base for gentrification and rehabilitation in this area, and the city is still investing in it. Even the deteriorated commercial strip along Selby Avenue started to finally being revived with the new commercial and residential development, aided by the city government in the late 1980s. It is not as evident that the goal of maintaining a healthy (1970s urban planning ideal) mix of different racial, social, and economic groups has been realized, The mix does exist, but poorer people are still being pushed to the west and north. The tensions between the dual goals of renewal persist. A 1984 WTCN broadcast video, “Nuthin’s the Same Anymore: The Gentrification of a Neighborhood,” though not a balanced view of renewal poignantly evoke the resentments and fears of many black residents. They were pushed out of the Rondo area by the freeway and now fear being pushed out of Summit-University by rising property values. They think that too much of the money spent in Summit-University has been to attract middle-class people and not enough to help poor people. Conflicting goals have plagues renewal and improvement efforts in this community from the start.

== Post urban renewal ==
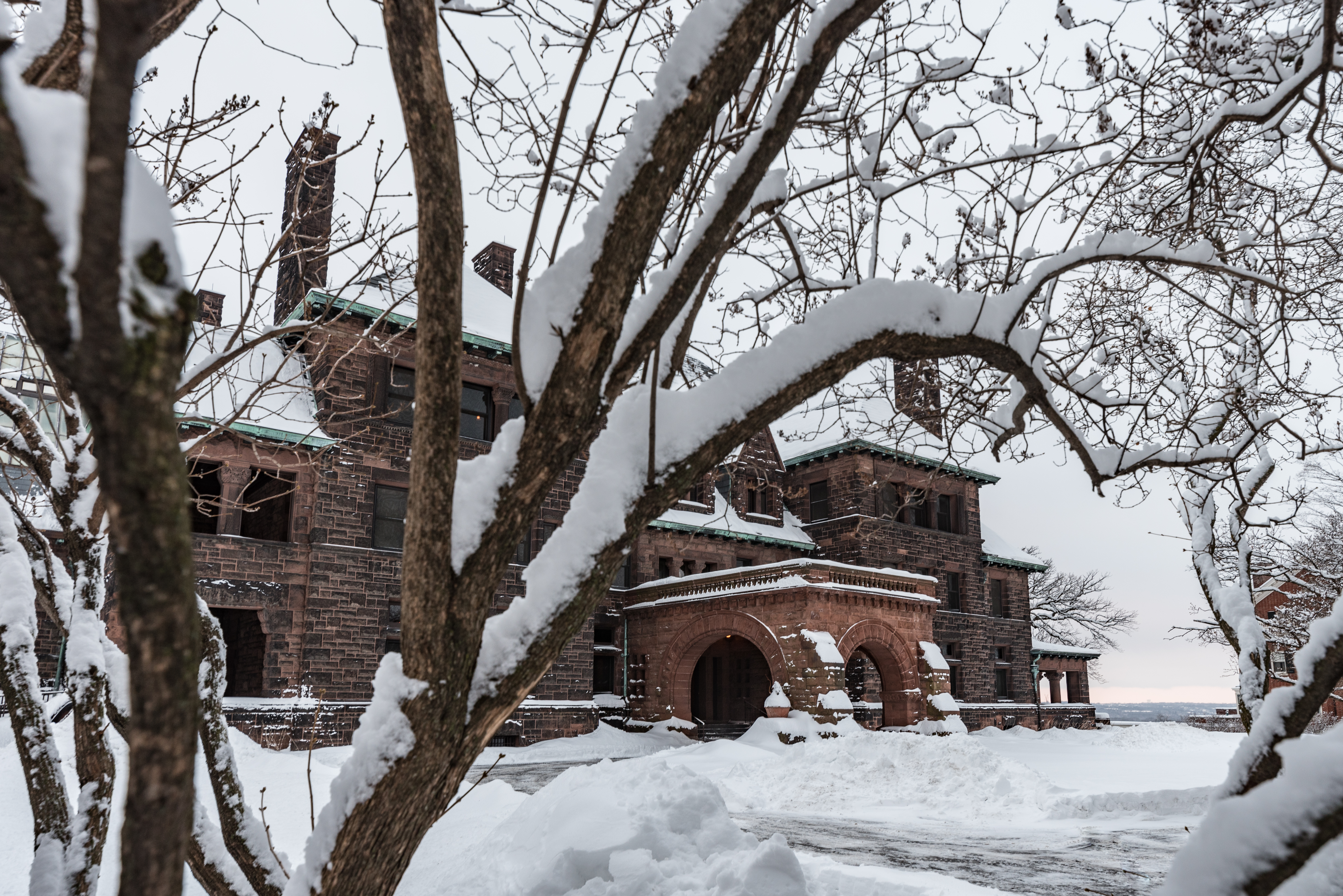
The James J. Hill House, now a museum.

The renewal of Summit-University had (and has) a dual focus: preserving the historic landscape and creating a cosmopolitan community. The two thrusts have often worked at cross purposes. Both have been at least partly achieved, though the preservation effort is more secure. The HRA did extensive house moving within the district to promote its historic ambience – an innovation that troubled HUD auditors for years. The preservation of the physical character of the area was clearly important to keeping and attracting middle-class households to the area. Summit-University provides an elegant urban setting that suburbs cannot match.

Summit-University is a large area whose renewal results have not been uniform. North of the freeway, in the north quadrant of the original project area is Central Village, a bit of suburb-in-the-city designed to retain St. Paul's black middle class. It was built in the late 1970s as part of the Western Redevelopment Project. Next to it at the corner of Dale Street and University Avenue, Unidale Mall has been less successful. Ideally, this project was to create a suburban shopping mall in the heart of the city. Even by generous standards, it has failed. Forced on city planners by neighborhood activists, the mall suffered the perennial problem of finding suitable tenants. Some that it did attract, such as a welfare office, are scarcely the stuff of suburban dreams.

== Cultural Influence ==
The destruction of the Rondo neighborhood in the 1960s through the construction of 1-94 was the focus of Josh Wilder's play "The Highwaymen", which was directed by Jamil Jude and performed at the History Theater in February 2016.

== NRHP listings ==
- Woodland Park District
- S. Edward Hall House
- Pilgrim Baptist Church
- David Luckert House
- Saint Joseph's Academy (Saint Paul, Minnesota)
- Cathedral of Saint Paul, National Shrine of the Apostle Paul
- James J. Hill House
- Blair Flats
- Burbank–Livingston–Griggs House
- F. Scott Fitzgerald House
- Vienna and Earl Apartment Buildings
- Horace Hills Irvine House
- Historic Hill District
