= Hiawatha Golf Course =

- U.S. National Register of Historic Places
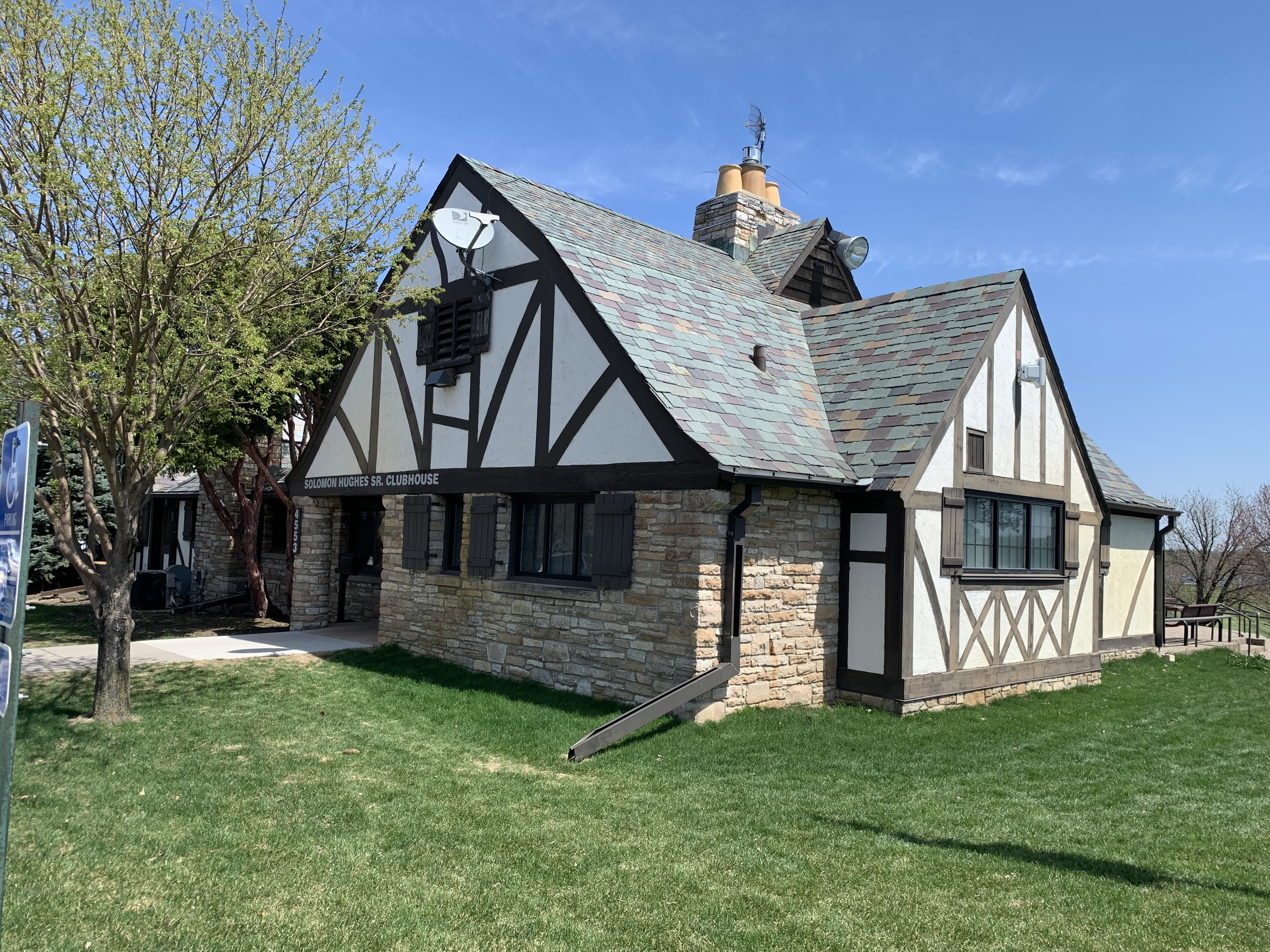
- Solomon Hughes Sr. Clubhouse

- Location within Minnesota Location within the United States
- Interactive map of Hiawatha Golf Course
- Location: 4553 Longfellow Avenue, Minneapolis, MN
- Coordinates: 44.92504°N 93.24467°W
- Area: 140.3 acres (56.8 ha)
- Built: 1929-1935
- Built by: Henry F. Olson (clubhouse)
- Architect: William D. Clark (golf course);Stravs, Dorr, Bersback, and Chapin (clubhouse)
- Architectural style: Late 19th and 20th century revivals/Tudor Revival
- NRHP reference No.: 100008905

Hiawatha Golf Course is a golf course adjacent to Lake Hiawatha in Minneapolis, Minnesota. The golf course was listed on the National Register of Historic Places in 2023 for its association with the African American community. The Minneapolis Park Board developed five golf courses in the first three decades of the 20th century, since golf was a relatively new sport at the time and interest was peaking. Black residents in Minneapolis were concentrated in a few neighborhoods, including Southside, so Hiawatha Golf Course became an important social and recreational center for that neighborhood.

== History ==
Lake Hiawatha was once known as Rice Lake. In 1922, the Minneapolis Park Board purchased 232 acres (94 ha) of land that had been a dairy farm. The park board had previously developed courses at Theodore Wirth Park (known as Glenwood Park at the time) in 1916, Columbia Park in 1919, and Gross Golf Course in 1925, all in the northern part of the city. Land on the south side of the city was getting hard to come by, so the park board bought 207 acres (84 ha) in Hopkins in 1925 and built Southwest Golf Course, later renamed Meadowbrook. The Rice Lake marsh was dredged to a depth of 33 feet, and the dredged soil was placed on the west side, to form the rolling landscape where the golf course was built. The golf clubhouse, designed by the firm of Stravs, Door, Bersbeck, and Chapin was constructed in 1932, and the golf course, designed by William B. Clark, was opened in July, 1934 (first 9 holes only, the full 18-hole course opened the next summer). It was quickly heavily used by Minneapolis residents. The dredged soil tended to compact and sink, requiring repairs to the early course, and a 1939 work relief project added shore retaining walls to prevent erosion, since the dredged shoreline was especially susceptible to erosion from waves.

The course was frequently used by metro-area African-American golfers, including several famous local figures like Solomon Hughes Sr. and Jimmy Slemmons. During the 1930s, many African-American residents lived in an area between 34th Street on the north, 46th Street on the south, Nicollet Avenue on the west, and Chicago Avenue on the east. Because of restrictive covenants and redlining, the Southside was one of the few places where African-Americans could live, along with the Northside in North Minneapolis and the Cedar-Riverside neighborhood. Hiawatha Golf Course was popular with Black members of the community because of its proximity to the Southside. As in the other courses in Minneapolis, a private club was organized as an affiliate of the public course. The Hiawatha Golf Club opened in 1936, and prospective members were accepted only by a unanimous vote of the board with no provision for an appeal, so the club only had white members for decades. Black golfers founded their own association, the Twin City Golf Club, and met at Black community centers such as the Hallie Q. Brown Community Center and the Sterling Club.

== Present state ==
Following a 2014 flood that caused extensive damage to the course, and the subsequent discovery of unpermitted groundwater pumping, the park board embarked on the development of a new master plan for the site. The planning process resulted in a recommendation to reduce the course from 18 holes to 9 holes, enhance the learning facilities for golf, use a greatly expanded wetland space to manage flooding and treat pollution, and introduce several new park amenities like boat rentals and concessions. The plan was met with resistance by golfers who wished to retain 18 holes. After several failed votes and years of debate, the plan passed on a 6–3 vote in September 2022.
