= Hawona Sullivan Janzen =

American poet and performance artist

Hawona Sullivan Janzen is an American writer, poet, and performance artist based in Minnesota. Her work explores the nature of love, loss, grief, and hope. She was born in Shreveport, Louisiana

== Career ==
Sullivan Janzen's poetry has been read on National Public Radio. She sings improvisational jazz with the Sonoglyph Collective.

She is a consultant for Forecast Public Art and the Hennepin Theatre Trust, as well as the gallery coordinator for the Urban Research and Outreach Engagement Center at the University of Minnesota. She is the coordinator for the Literary Witnesses poetry reading series.

In 2017, she participated in Poetry of Resistance and Change, where her work was featured in large scale on the side of public buildings. The project, organized by Monica Sheets Larson under the moniker Sister Black Press, featured an installation of hundreds of letterpress printed cards and broadsides featuring poetry from Junauda Petrus and others. The poetry was displayed outside the Soap Factory for three weeks in 2017, and a public event was held that started with an artist-led bike ride, featured poetry readings, and was printed live using a mobile bicycle printing press.

In 2019, she was a Naked Stages Fellow and put on a performance art piece titled Hydro’s Phobia. In 2020, she and Kathy McTavish created a 638-hour-long performance piece titled A Coming Together: A Performance for Our Time.

=== Rondo Family Reunion ===
In 2016, Sullivan Janzen, alongside Minnesota poet Clarence White and photographer Chris Scott, partnered with Springboard for the Arts to create the public art project Rondo Family Reunion. This project revolved around the Rondo neighborhood of St. Paul, which was a thriving Black community from the 1930s until it was torn apart by the construction of Interstate 94 in 1955. The highway displaced hundreds of residents and businesses; one in every eight African Americans in St. Paul lost a home to the construction. The three artists met with community elders to document their stories and displayed lawn signs over the neighborhood with photography and poetry telling the stories of the Rondo diaspora. The project received funding from the McKnight Foundation and the Minnesota Arts and Cultural Heritage Fund.

After the shooting of Philando Castile during a traffic stop in 2016, Sullivan Janzen found herself wondering "Why is it that the only time the media comes to talk about us is when we are suffering from grief and experiencing loss?" Rondo Family Reunion came out of a need to lift up joyous and everyday stories of the community rather than focusing on the loss.
