= Woodland Park District =

Historic district in Minnesota, United States

- U.S. National Register of Historic Places
- U.S. Historic district
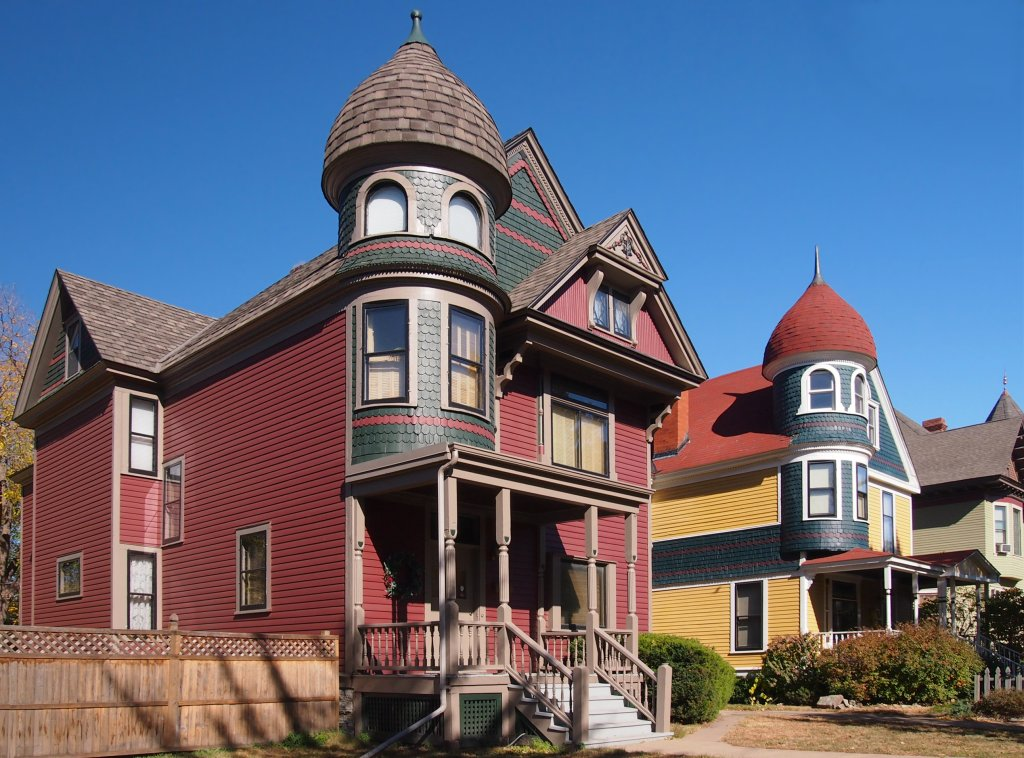
- The 1889 L.J. Gates and A. Bettingen Houses

- Location within Minnesota Location within the United States
- Location: Saint Paul, Minnesota
- Coordinates: 44°56′52″N 93°7′21″W
- Built: 1880–1910
- Architect: Multiple
- Architectural style: Late 19th and 20th Century Revivals, late Victorian, Queen Anne
- NRHP reference No.: 78001559
- Added to NRHP: May 12, 1978

The Woodland Park District is a historic district of 63 single and multi-family houses in Saint Paul, Minnesota, United States, roughly bounded latitudinally by Marshall and Selby Avenue and longitudinally by Arundel and Dale Street. It is an island within the Historic Hill District, added to the National Register of Historic Places in 1978.
