= Penumbra Theatre Company =

African-American theatre company in Saint Paul, Minnesota

Coordinates: 44°56′57″N 93°7′23″W

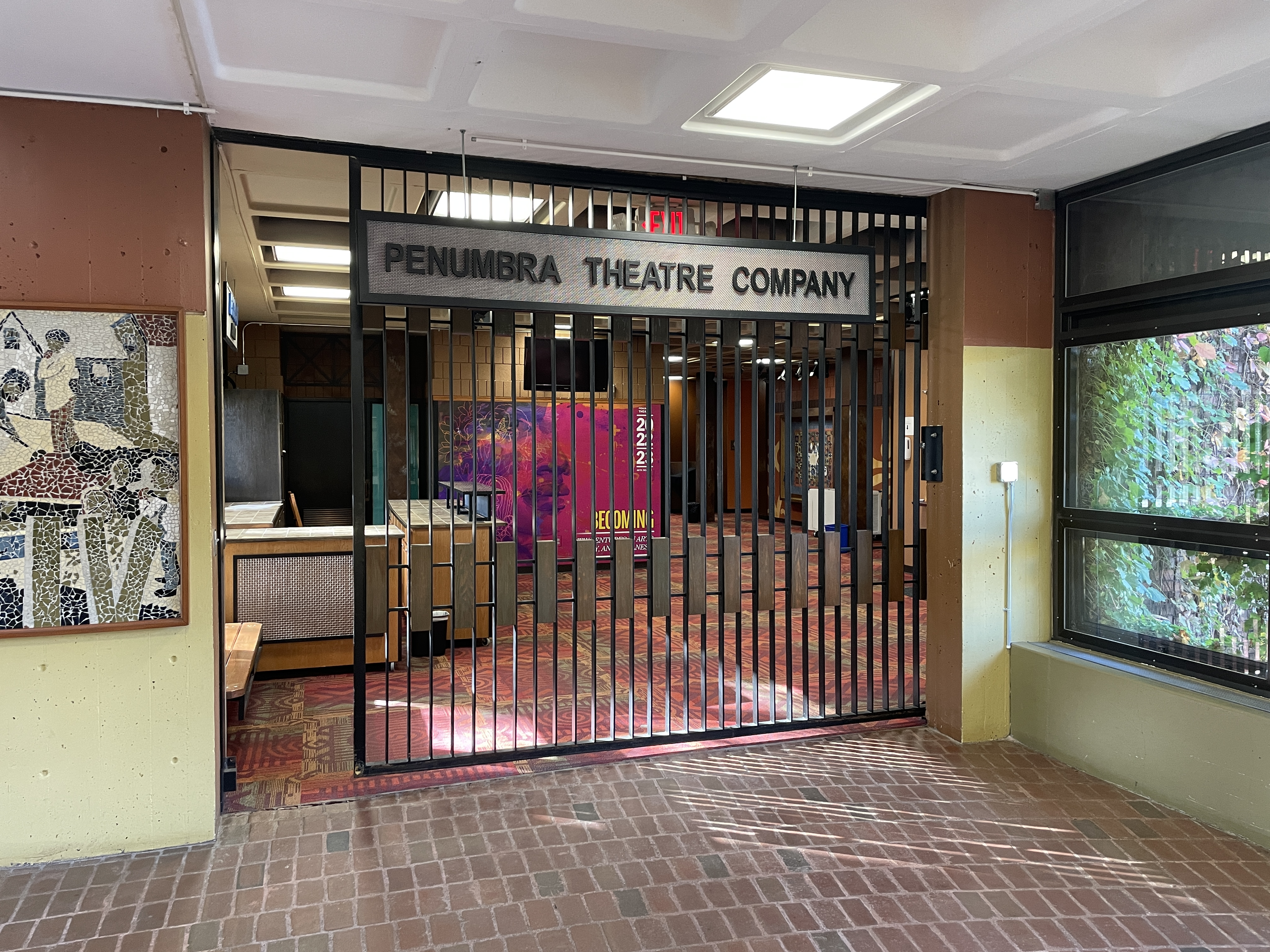
The entrance to the Penumbra Theatre Company in the Rondo -Dale neighborhood of Saint Paul, Minnesota.

The Penumbra Theatre Company, an African-American theatre company in Saint Paul, Minnesota, was founded by Lou Bellamy in 1976. The theater has been recognized for its artistic quality and its role in launching the careers of playwrights, including two-time Pulitzer Prize-winner August Wilson.

In 2020, the company announced its transformation into The Penumbra Center for Racial Healing.

== Origins ==
Due to displacement and segregation in the nineteenth and early twentieth centuries, many African Americans were aided by settlement homes for not only economic and social services, but programming for the arts as well. The Hallie Q. Brown Community Center of Saint Paul, Minnesota, much like the South Side Settlement house in Chicago and Henry Street Settlement house in New York, wanted to invest more in its art programming because it gave community members the tools to craft a voice within a community through visual arts, music, literature, and theatre. These centers were not only a popular outlet for entertainment, but also a critical part of the Black Arts Movement where African Americans spoke out about racial inequalities and allowed them to shape a sense of identity. The Hallie Q. Brown Community Center's second executive director, Henry R. Thomas, drafted a construction plan to incorporate a fully functional theater within its Martin Luther King Jr. facility to support these demands.

In 1976, the Comprehensive Employment and Training Act (CETA) awarded the Hallie Q. Brown Community Center a $150,000 grant to further develop its cultural arts programming. The CETA funding enabled the appointment of Lou Bellamy, a theatre arts graduate student at University of Minnesota, as the center's cultural arts director where he later founded the Penumbra Theatre Company. In 1991 Penumbra transitioned to a separate organization, independent of the Hallie Q. Brown Community Center.

== Early Seasons ==
Eden (1976) by Steve Carter was the first production to launch of the 1977–78 season of the Penumbra Theatre Company. It explores diversity of ethnicities within the African-American community. The Negro Ensemble Company had recently premiered this performance, giving the Penumbra a direct tie to the Black Arts movement. Another relation to the movement is Ed Bullins, a prominent editor, theorist, and playwright who wrote Penumbra's second production, the 1975 Broadway transfer of The Taking of Miss Jane. The third production, Heartland, Louisiana, showcases original work by Penumbra's resident playwright, Horace Bond, who was Bellamy's former graduate advisor and mentor. Bond focused mainly on developing African-American productions, particularly in the south. This proved successful in captivating and connecting African-American audiences who either grew up in the heavily segregated south and moved to northern cities or had relatives that had done so. For the fourth production, the Company staged the historic work of William Wells Brown’s The Escape; or, a Leap for Freedom. Penumbra chose to actively produce plays that dealt with the implications and practices of minstrelsy in an effort to further investigate the history of African-American theatre.

Penumbra initially identified itself as a multiracial company. While the company’s members, staff, and audience has always been ethnically diverse, their leadership and productions have a distinguishable dominance of African-American culture. As its first few seasons continued, it began to fully emerge as an African-American theatre company.

== Black Theater ==
In Penumbra, Bellamy and the other founders explored what black theater could be. "What has emerged is a style informed and shaped by the community in which this theater resides," Bellamy said. "I want to reflect that community and speak to it." Over time that has come to mean specifically black theater for black audiences, but open to everyone; incorporating historical works of Langston Hughes, new works of August Wilson, adaptions of Zora Neale Hurston's stories and Black Nativity, Penumbra's annual Christmas show, all infused with the essence of black vernacular. Twin Cities theater critic Peter Vaughan attributed Penumbra's national success to these factors: strong artistic quality, solid long-range strategic plan, emphasis on hiring experienced administrators, and increased corporate and foundation support.

"Bellamy.. insists that black theater – which he defines as stories of the black experience, rooted in the black community, as told by blacks – can only be done correctly with a deep understanding of black literature and culture, including the impact of slavery. Without that background, Bellamy says, a director is likely to overlook or misread clues embedded in the text – everything from West-African story motifs to the tendency of a race cowed by slavery to hide learning rather than to celebrate it."

== Company Members ==
=== Original ensemble ===
Estelene Bell, Phil Blackwell, Danny Clark, Gordon Cronce, Laura Drake, Mazi Johnson, Ruth Lasila, Tia Mann, Jay Patterson, Claude Purdy, Faye M. Price, Abdul Salaam El Razzac, G. Travis Williams, James A. Williams, Marion McClinton, and August Wilson

=== Original staff ===
Ken Evins, W. J. E. “Strider” Hammer, Scott Peters, Scott Price, Anne Deem, Craig Thiesen, Richard Thompson, Ron Schultz, and Mary Winchell

=== Notable company members ===
August Wilson. Penumbra helped launch Pulitzer-Prize-winning playwright and poet August Wilson early in his career. Encouraged to move to St. Paul from his native Pittsburgh in 1978 by his friend Claude Purdy, he started to write from his experience. Wilson's first play, Black Bart and the Sacred Hills (1977), and later Jitney! (1982) premiered at the Penumbra Theater. His work is still regularly played on the Penumbra stage.

“We are what we imagine ourselves to be, and we can only imagine what we know to be possible. The founding of Penumbra Theatre enlarged that possibility. And its corresponding success provokes the community to a higher expectation of itself. I became a playwright because I saw where my chosen profession was being sanctioned by a group of black men and women who were willing to invest their lives and their talent in assuming a responsibility for our presence in the world and the conduct of our industry as black Americans." - August Wilson, Written to commemorate the 20th anniversary of The Penumbra Theatre Company in 1996

Lou Bellamy founded the Penumbra theater in 1976, and remained the artistic director of the company until 2017, when the position was filled by his daughter, Sarah Bellamy. He has served as the Associate Professor at the University of Minnesota in the Department of Theatre Arts and Dance for over 30 years. Lou Bellamy is largely credited for the artistic success of the Penumbra theater, as he is responsible for hiring and gestating some of the theater's more celebrated artists (Including writer August Wilson and director Claude Purdy). In May 2001, Lou Bellamy won an Obie award for his directorial contribution to August Wilson's Two Trains Running.

== Programming ==
The 135-seat theater serves as a space to showcase the exploration of the African-American experience. Each year, Penumbra performs for over 40,000 people and conducts educational outreach workshops for more than 5,000 students. The theater employs more actors, choreographers, dancers, directors, and administrators of color than all other theaters in Minnesota combined. Located at St Paul's Hallie Q. Brown Community Center in the Martin Luther King Center building, the Penumbra is the largest of three African-American theaters in the United States, has nurtured important talents and created unique spaces for the black voice past and present.

=== Cornerstone ===
In 1984, Penumbra theatre launched the Cornerstone New Play Contest to provide a realistic opportunity for new black playwrights who were just starting out. They intended to continue performing black classics, but wanted to expand in to new work as well. Cornerstone was instantly successful as Jitney by August Wilson was the first script produced that year. Ten years later, over 300 scripts were submitted for consideration, and Penumbra became able to offer a cash award thanks to a grant from the Jerome Foundation.

=== Outreach initiatives ===
In addition to theatrical performances, the Penumbra Theater also runs public events, dialogues, workshops and a variety of other events aimed at social awareness. Programs include the Fund for Improvement of Post-Secondary Education, workshops on race, a summer institute for teenagers, and performances and internships for students.

== Critical reception and awards ==
- In 2000, Danny Glover presented the Penumbra Theatre company with the Jujamcyn Award in New York City, putting the company on the top list of regional theatres.
- In 2020, the Ford Foundation awarded Penumbra a $2.5 million grant through their American Cultural Treasures initiative. In 2021, MacKenzie Scott's foundation awarded Penumbra Theatre with a $5 million gift.
