= Selby Avenue =

Street in Saint Paul, Minnesota

Coordinates: 44°56′48″N 93°9′2″W

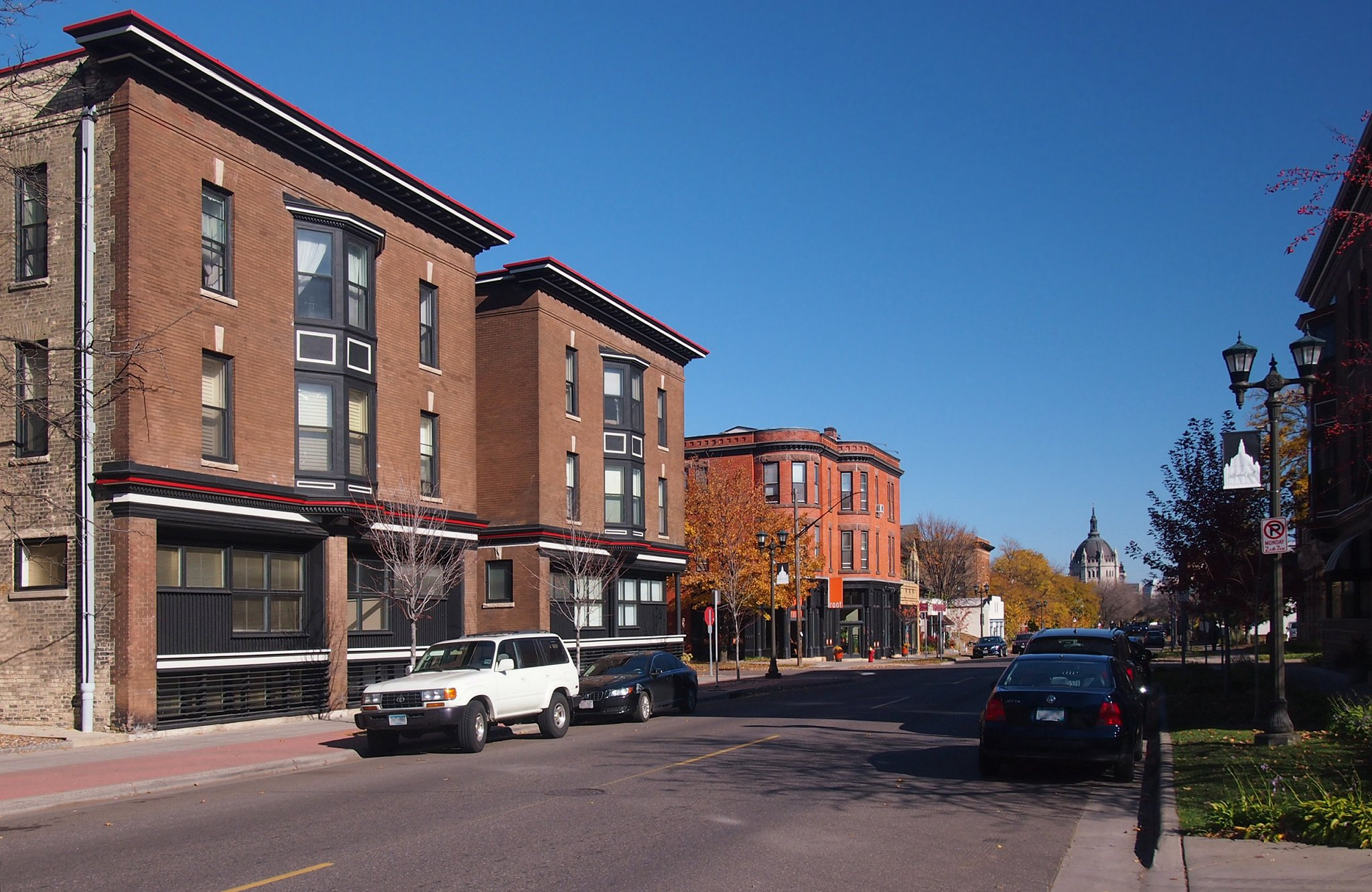
Eastern end of Selby Avenue with the Cathedral of Saint Paul in the background

Selby Avenue is a street in Saint Paul, Minnesota, United States, that runs east–west from Summit Avenue near downtown toward the Mississippi River. The street runs through the Summit-University and Union Park neighborhoods. The street, especially between Dale Street and Snelling Avenue, has been associated with Saint Paul's black community. The far eastern end of the street has historically been more densely developed and architecturally significant.

== Beginnings ==
Selby was first named in 1854 as part of Dayton and Irvine's Addition. The street was named after Jeremiah W. Selby, who owned a farm on St. Anthony Hill, the present location of the Cathedral of Saint Paul. Selby paid $50 per acre for his 40-acre farm in 1847. Henry Mower Rice scoffed at Selby buying a plot of land so removed from Downtown Saint Paul, swampy and inaccessible due to the river bluff. The street name was also published on an 1857 map published by Goodrich & Somers called "Map of the City of Saint Paul".

A cable car line was built from Downtown Saint Paul to Selby and St. Albans in 1887. It opened January 16, 1888. The line traveled along Broadway, Fourth, and Third streets before climbing the bluff and traveling along Selby. The line was extended to Fairview Avenue in 1890. In the 1890s, Selby Avenue outshone Grand Avenue with many more large buildings, commercial buildings, apartments and duplexes.

The portion of Selby Avenue between Fairview Avenue and Cleveland Avenue, lies in what is referred to as the Second Addition to Merriam Park. Originally this portion of Selby Ave was named Mabel Avenue, and later changed to Hague Avenue. It was decided with City of St. Paul Ordinance No. 1,094, on February 7, 1889, that this portion would be renamed Selby Avenue.

== Streetcar era prosperity ==
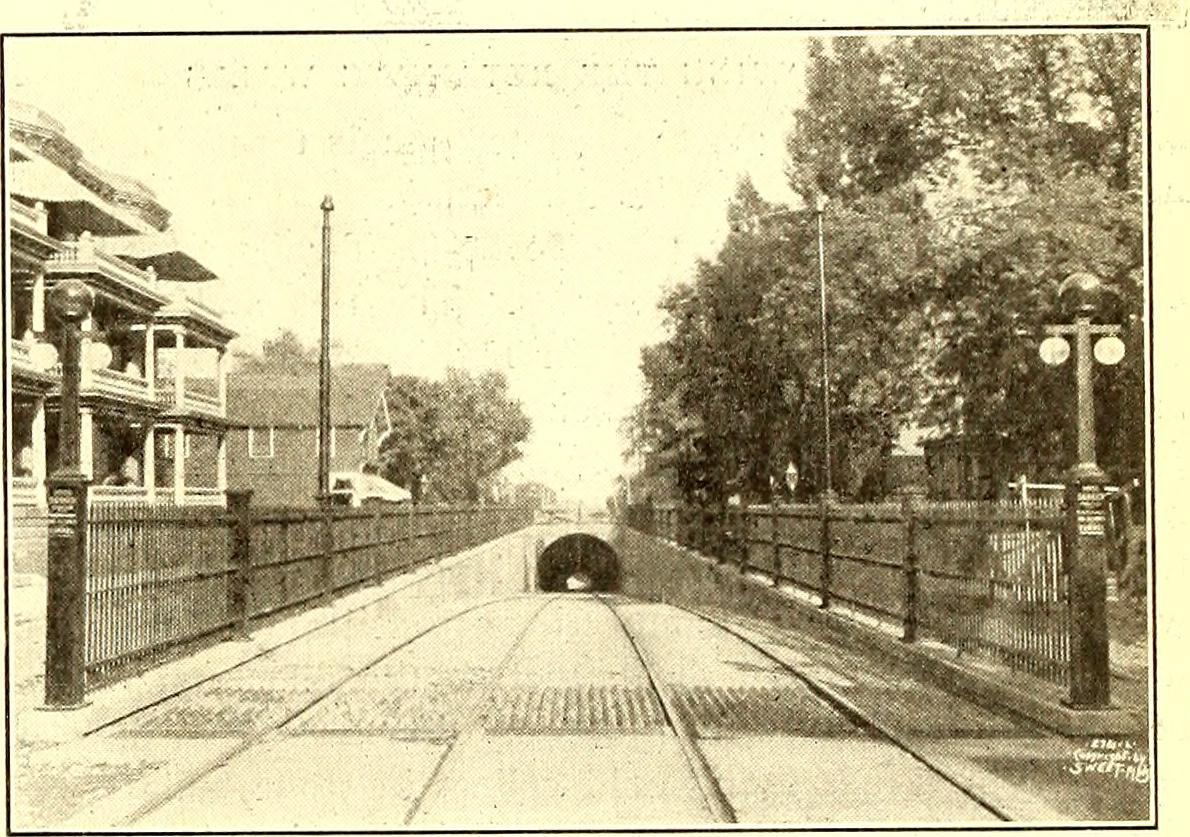
Entrance to the Selby Avenue streetcar tunnel, 1907

The 16% grade on the hill towards Selby Avenue from downtown was difficult for streetcars to climb. A complex system of counterweights helped streetcars travel up the hill. The Twin City Rapid Transit Company built a 1,500 foot tunnel that changed the grade to 7%. The tunnel is 15 feet high and 23 feet across. The tunnel entrance at the base of the hill is still visible and has been sealed closed. Construction of the tunnel significantly decreased travel time and caused a sudden increase in development of the neighborhood along the line.

The St. Paul Curling Club has been housed on Selby since 1912. To meet the demands of downtown workers and young couples there was a boom of apartment building construction in the 1920s. In the 1920s and 1930s several ill-fated automobile dealerships existed along Selby. Into the 1950s the avenue had a mix of business, homes, and apartments. Saint Paul's Jewish population briefly settled along Selby Avenue after becoming more successful before moving to Highland Park. Many stores and businesses were owned by Jewish residents along Selby. After the destruction of the Rondo neighborhood, caused by the construction of Interstate 94, many of Saint Paul's black families moved south to Selby Avenue giving the Summit-University neighborhood a dramatic change in demographics. The area experienced white flight as families moved out of the area.

== Decline ==
Wong Chow Mein Cafe at Selby Avenue and Western Avenue, 1976

The destruction of Old Rondo and construction of Interstate 94 partially led to Selby Avenue's decline. Highway planners also envisioned the need to widen Marshall Avenue and Selby Avenue after Interstate 94 met its peak carrying capacity sometime in the 1970s. The possibility of this widening and taking of homes along these streets inhibited investment along those corridors. In the 1960s and 1970s the area around Selby-Dale had some of the worst housing and street crime in Saint Paul. According to merchants, broken windows, bomb threats and slashed tires were common. During this time many businesses chose to locate on Grand Avenue or University Avenue rather than Selby.

On the night of August 30, 1968 four policemen were shot, hundreds of youths were tear-gassed, 20 policemen were injured, 26 people were arrested, and 11 fires were set in the area after a disturbance at a music performance in Downtown Saint Paul. The event was the worst racial disturbance in Saint Paul's history. On January 13, 1969, black youth shouting "Black Power" smashed the windows of four businesses with baseball bats. The businesses never reopened and after two others business' windows were smashed they too closed. When businesses found they could no longer get insurance for their properties on Selby Avenue they moved leaving vacant storefronts. The disturbances effectively destroyed the viability of the commercial strip to the benefit of neighboring streets.

In 1980, the area had a mix of low-income, blue-collar and middle- to upper-class professionals, of which 56% rented. Twenty percent of residents lived below the poverty line and 44% of residents were black with 43% white. Saint Paul City Council member Bill Wilson attempted to rename the street after Roy Wilkins in the fall of 1982. Three of the corners at Selby Avenue and Dale Street were empty or vacant in 1986. The City of Saint Paul owned the lots on southwest and northeast corners of Selby and Dale in 1988 and was actively trying to sell them to a developer.

== Present day ==
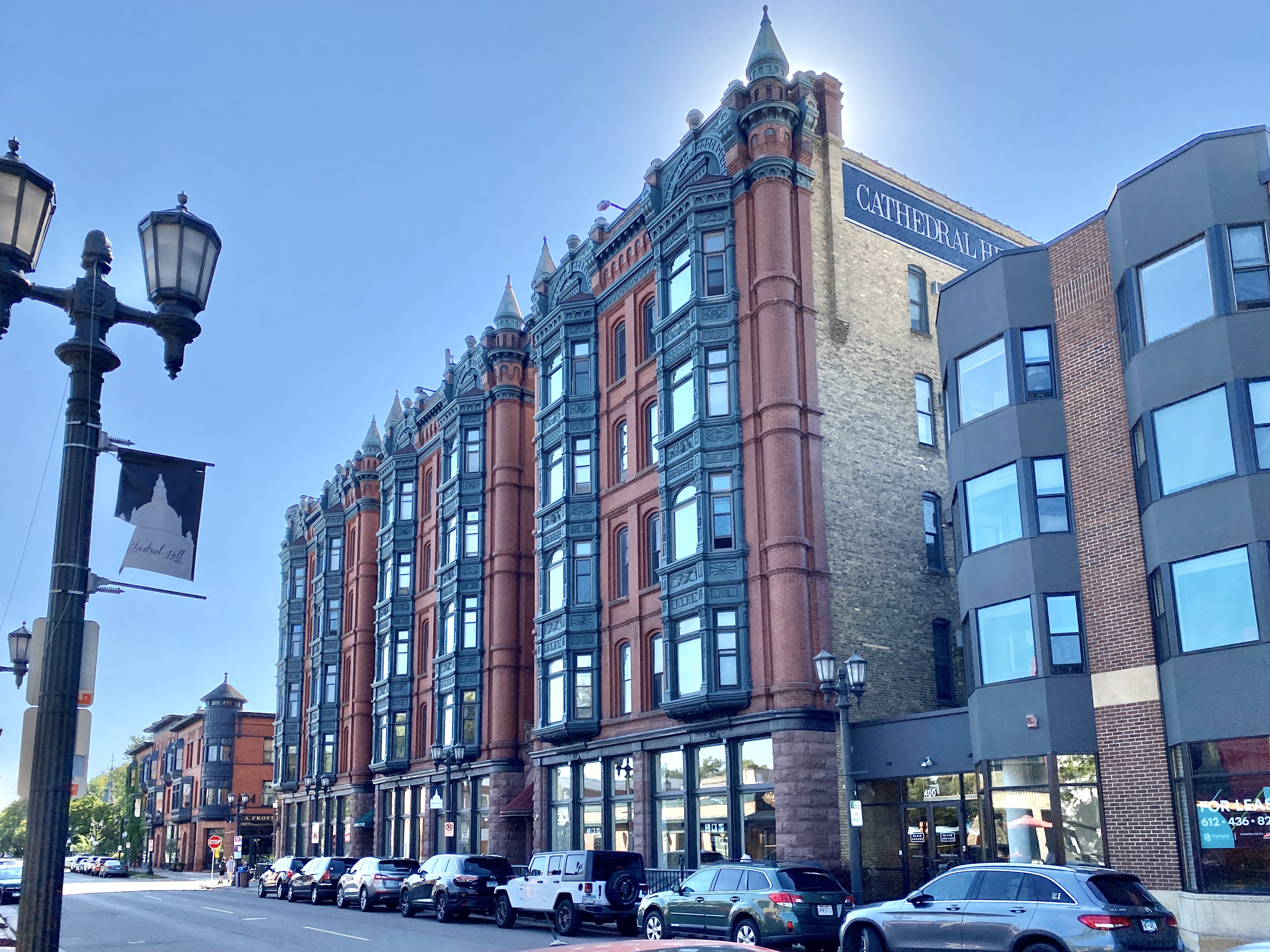
The Blair Flats at Selby Avenue and Western Avenue, built in 1887 and listed on the National Register of Historic Places, were restored in the 1980s

The intersection of Selby and Western experienced a burst of upscale developments in the 1980s. The two empty lots on Selby and Dale were not filled in until the late 1990s with the construction of a co-op grocery store, Mississippi Market, and restaurants opening on the other corner. These developments led to hopes that Selby Avenue would have a resurgence and become a more successful commercial strip like nearby Grand Avenue. The present day East end of Selby Avenue is home to a number of thriving businesses, including cafes, restaurants, gastropubs and boutiques, and renewed efforts to push this development West of Dale.

The Metro B Line is the main public transit service along Selby Avenue, running along or parallel to the street for its entire length. The B Line replaces Metro Transit Route 21, which was one of the region's busiest bus routes. The B Line continues west across the Lake Street-Marshall Bridge to West Maka Ska, Minneapolis via Lake Street, and east to Saint Paul Union Depot.

The northern end of Ayd Mill Road currently feeds into Selby Avenue. Significant congestion can occur from traffic traveling between I-94 and I-35E via Snelling, Selby, and Ayd Mill Road.
