= Lou Bellamy =

American theatrical director

- Born: March 10, 1944 (age 82); Chicago, Illinois
- Occupations: Actor, Educator, Founder, Artistic Director
- Years active: 1976–present
- Known for: Penumbra Theatre Company founder
- Spouse: Colleen Bellamy
- Awards: IVEY Lifetime Achievement Award, McKnight Foundation Distinguished Artist, Obie Award, Kay Sexton award

Lou Bellamy (born March 10, 1944) is an American stage director, actor, producer, entrepreneur, and educator. He is the founder and artistic director, Emeritus of Penumbra Theatre Company in St. Paul, Minnesota. He taught at the University of Minnesota from 1979 until his retirement as an associate professor in 2011.

== Education ==
Bellamy received his B.A. in psychology and sociology at Minnesota State University, Mankato in 1967, and received his M.A. in theater arts at the University of Minnesota in 1978.

== Personal life ==
Louis Bellamy was born on March 10, 1944, in Chicago, Illinois, to ElVeeda Luckett Bellamy and James Kirk. In 1950, his mother married Maurice Leonidas (Tiny) Bellamy, who soon after adopted Lou. Bellamy graduated from Saint Paul Central High School in 1962. Bellamy and his wife, Colleen Bellamy, are the parents of two adult children, Sarah and Lucas.

== Career ==
At the University of Minnesota he taught classes in acting, directing, and communication as well as specialized classes in Black theater. In 1976, the Hallie Q. Brown Community Center received a grant geared to cultural arts programming. The CETA funding enabled his appointment as the center's cultural arts director, where he launched the Penumbra Theatre Company. At Penumbra his numerous productions included 23 world premieres. He had a particularly close relationship with playwright August Wilson, and Penumbra produced more plays by Wilson than any other theater in the world. Bellamy's directing there has earned an Obie award. In 2014 his daughter Sarah Bellamy succeeded him as leader of Penumbra.

Bellamy has been quoted regarding Black theater as saying: "There's a little pressure now to widen my work, with agents and artistic directors asking if I want to do Chekhov. I can, but I don't want to. There are only a few people who get chances to be where I am in my career. I want to use it for putting the lens on Black people and showing them in all their beauty, their facets and warts. These are people who I care about and love and want to see in all their complexity on the stage."

Bellamy also directed plays at Arizona Theatre Company, Denver Center for the Performing Arts, Signature Theatre, Oregon Shakespeare Festival, The Cleveland Play House, Indiana Repertory Theatre, The Guthrie Theater, The Kennedy Center, and Hartford Stage Company

== Recognition ==
In 2005 he was awarded IVEY Lifetime Achievement Award

In 2006 he was named Distinguished Artist by the McKnight Foundation.

In 2007 he won an Obie Award for directing a New York production of Wilson's Two Trains Running.

In 2017 he won the Kay Sexton award for his career as a teacher, mentor, director and promoter of African American Literature.
