= Rondo neighborhood =

Historically Black area in Saint Paul, Minnesota

Rondo
- Historic Neighborhood
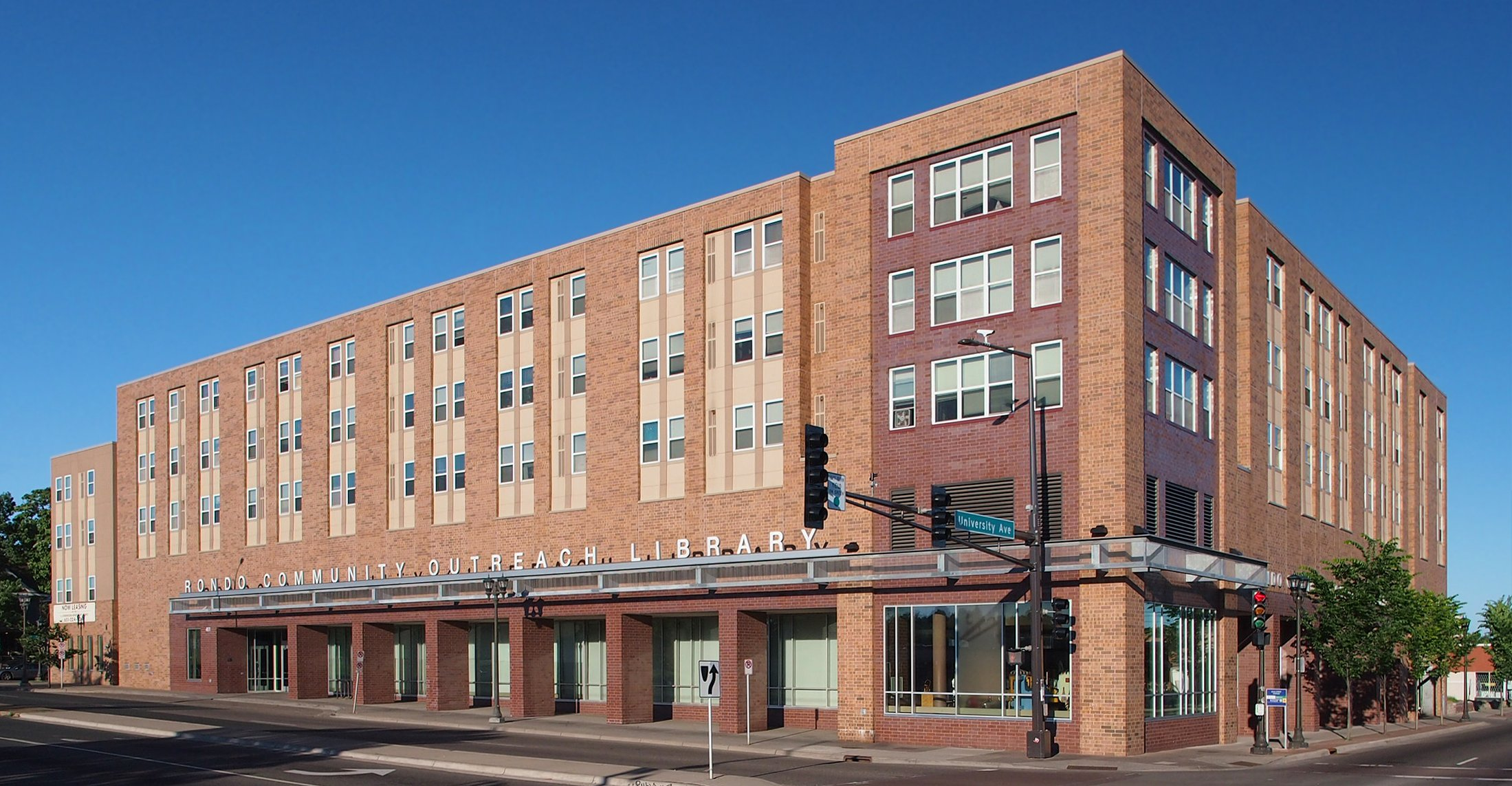
- Rondo Community Outreach Library, 2016
- Center of Rondo in Saint Paul
- Country: United States
- State: Minnesota
- County: Ramsey
- City: Saint Paul
- Time zone: UTC-6 (CST)
  - Summer (DST): UTC-5 (CDT)

The Rondo neighborhood, or simply Rondo, is located within the officially designated Summit-University district in Saint Paul, Minnesota. The boundaries of the historically black neighborhood are sometimes referred to as Old Rondo. For much of the 20th century, Rondo was an important cultural and residential center of the black community in the Minneapolis–Saint Paul metropolitan region. The core of Old Rondo was demolished between 1956 and 1968, to make way for the construction of the Interstate 94 freeway. At least 650 families were displaced from the neighborhood, as well as many businesses and community locations. The neighborhood, although scarred by highway construction, remained a notable area in Saint Paul with a strong sense of cultural identity. Popular media and historians have explored the impacts of highway construction and gentrification on Rondo residents past and present. In the 2000s, residents and public officials have discussed ways to reconnect the former community.

== Overview ==
The Rondo neighborhood is located in the City of Saint Paul, Minnesota. From the late 1800s, it has been an important center of the Black community in the Twin Cities. As it developed, the Rondo neighborhood became an economically diverse community, supported by social clubs, religious organizations, community centers and an active business community. With the availability of Federal block funds, Rondo's central area was destroyed between 1956 and 1968, for the construction of the Interstate 94 freeway. (Note: "Last summer, St. Paul's mayor issued an apology for the racially motivated routing of a highway through the Rondo neighborhood. " U.S. Secretary of Transportation Anthony Foxx) Families and businesses that did not accept the low financial amounts offered and willingly move were met with violence from the authorities. The displacement from the neighborhood of families, businesses and organizations had a negative impact on the well-being of the Black community in the Twin Cities.

== Geography ==
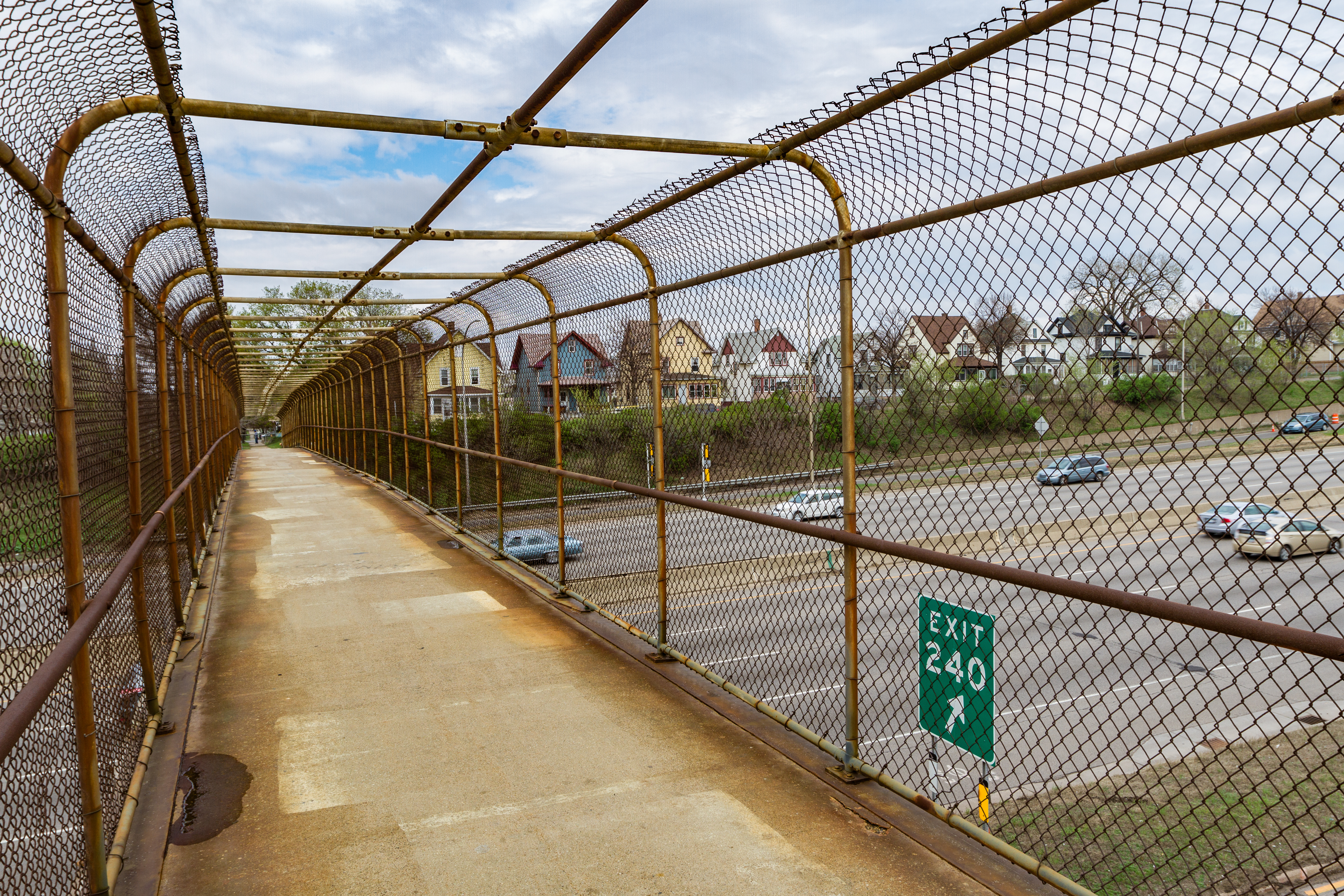
Pedestrian bridge over Interstate 94 at Grotto Street North

In 1950, Rondo was bounded by Lexington Avenue to the west, Rice Street to the east, Marshall Avenue to the south and University Avenue to the north.

The Interstate 94 freeway runs east–west, centered between what had been Rondo Avenue and St. Anthony. Originally Rondo Avenue and St. Anthony Avenue were thoroughfares that ran parallel, both beginning at Rice Street. Rondo ended at Dunlop Street and St. Anthony went the full length to Cretin Avenue at the Town and Country Club Golf Course. The construction of I-94 took the north portion of Rondo and the south portion of St. Anthony. The remainder of both Rondo and St. Anthony became freeway service roads, and Rondo Avenue was renamed Concordia Avenue.

Four bridges over I-94 connect the two halves of what had been Rondo neighborhood: Lexington Avenue, at the western boundary of Rondo; Victoria Avenue; Dale Avenue; and Western Avenue, close to its eastern boundary. East of Western Avenue in 1966 Saint Paul College) built a new single-building campus at 235 Marshall Avenue.

The area south of I-94 was absorbed into the Summit-University neighborhood. The neighborhood of Frogtown starts at University Avenue and extends northward, but does not include the section of what had been Rondo between University Avenue and I-94.

== History ==
=== Early history ===
The street which lent the neighborhood its name, Rondo Avenue, was named for an early settler of the area, the voyageur Joseph Rondeau. Rondeau, an employee of the Hudson's Bay Company, was evicted from his log cabin near Fort Snelling and staked claims near what is now downtown St. Paul in the late 1860s. Rondeau sold his claims in 1872, but his name stuck to the area. Intensive settlement of the area began after 1890, when a streetcar line was built along University Avenue. The neighborhood quickly attracted working-class migrant populations fleeing poor conditions in the flood-prone West Side Flats. Among these populations were German Lutherans, Irish Catholics, Eastern European Jews, and Black migrants from the South. By the late 1920s, the neighborhood came to be defined by Black and Jewish residents. Jewish inhabitants mostly left the neighborhood (often for Highland Park) after World War II, strengthening the identity of Rondo as a Black neighborhood.

=== Established Black community ===
Rondo was the backbone of the Black community in St. Paul. Black homeownership thrived in Minnesota from 1900 on. Organizations in Rondo included the St. Paul chapter of the National Association for the Advancement of Colored People in which Roy Wilkins was involved; Black newspapers included the St. Paul Echo between 1925 and 1927, the Appeal, the Northwest Bulletin, and the St. Paul Recorder (now the Minnesota Spokesman-Recorder). The St. Paul Echo was published by Earl Wilkins, brother of Roy Wilkins.

The St. Paul chapter of the Urban League, the Hallie Q. Brown Community Center, the Phyllis Wheatley Community Center and many other community resources took form in Rondo. (Note: Jamil Jude, director of "The Highwaymen" describes the ongoing presence of Rondo in the Black community, "As a Black artist, when you move here, the first question people ask you is, ‘Do you know about the history of Rondo?' I've been wondering why people always want to tell Black artists that story and I think it's because there is a desire to remember the history, the beauty of that community and what a disastrous — to the community — event the construction of the highway was," says Jude. "So I feel like the seeds of this story were planted in me in 2011, when I moved to town.")

Black baseball remains an enduring part of the Rondo legacy. Famous players include Toni Stone, one of three women who played in the Negro leagues in the early 1950s; and Roy Campanella, Hall of Fame catcher for the Brooklyn Dodgers, who lived in Rondo during the late 1940s while with an earlier version of the Saints. Dave Winfield, the Hall of Fame outfielder whose career spanned the 1970s to early 1990s, grew up in Rondo until his family was displaced by the highway construction project.

=== Routing of Interstate 94 ===
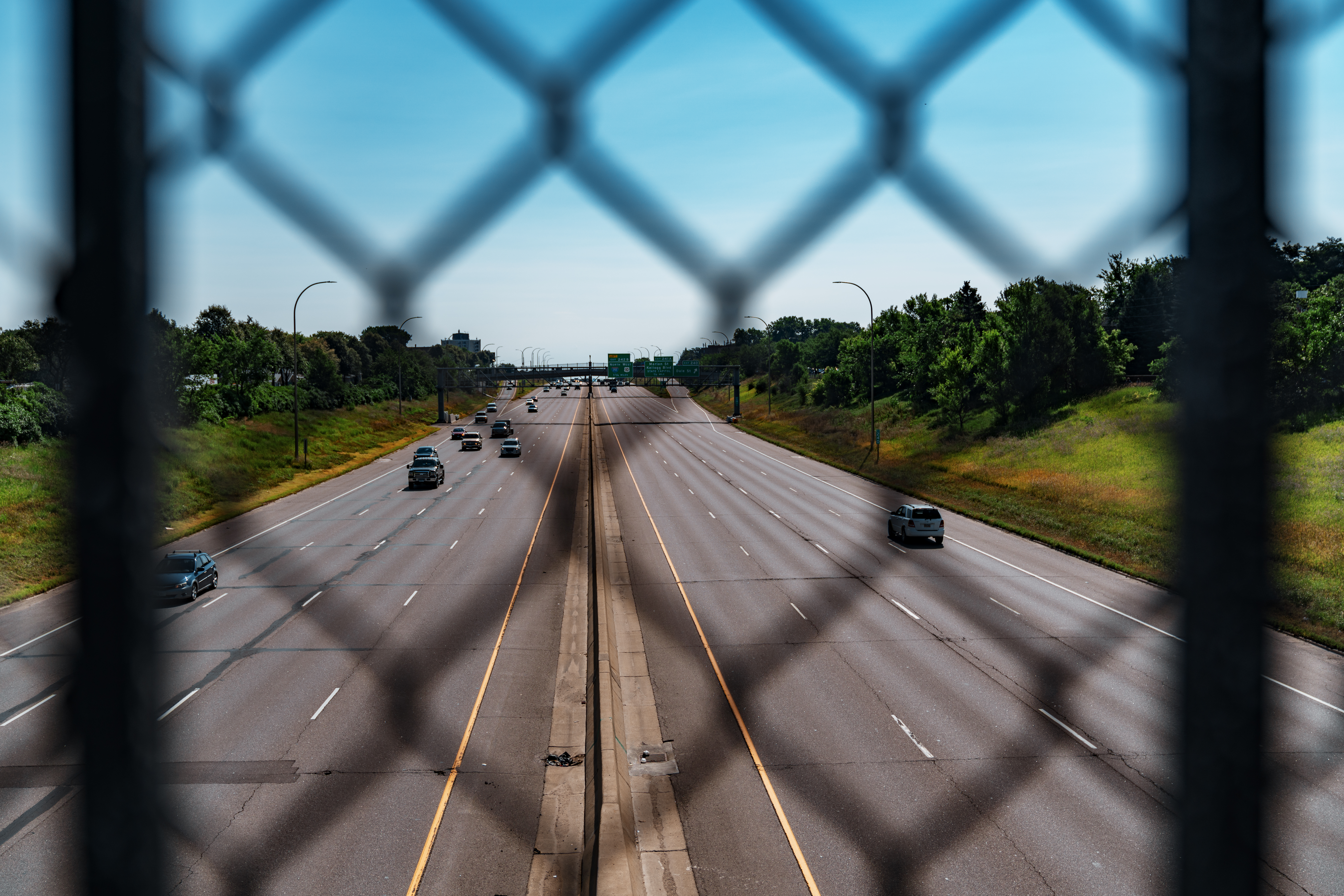
Interstate 94 at Victoria Street

The Federal Aid Highway Act of 1956 provided funding to American cities to build a network of freeways, necessitated by greater automobile use nationwide. A choice of routes existed; one other option was farther north, along abandoned rail tracks. The more central route—through the majority-Black neighborhood of Rondo—was chosen. In hindsight, there is widespread agreement that the negative ramifications of this construction fell disproportionately on the residents of Rondo. (Note: "That Rondo's residents were black, that many were poor, that they were marginalized politically made the neighborhood the path of least resistance for the project.") (Note: "All across this country, where interstates were built, the urban poor — and, specifically, communities of color — were displaced," says Jude. "It's hard to say that highways are not what Minneapolis and St Paul needed. They did need them. But, at the same time, did we have to go where we decided to go? Who loses when progress has to happen?") (Note: "Today we acknowledge the sins of our past, regret the stain of racism that allowed so callous a decision as the one that led to families being dragged from their homes, creating a diaspora of the African-American Community in St. Paul." St. Paul Mayor Chris Coleman, 2015)

The black community of Rondo was weakened. Some black residents moved to other areas in the Twin Cities including Maplewood, Brooklyn Center, Robbinsdale and Crystal. Those who stayed suffered from fewer black establishments and the geographic interruption of neighborhood by the freeway.

Other negative outcomes of the route chosen include the separation of the Minnesota State Capitol building from the commercial district of Downtown St. Paul, and some inconvenience for the Prospect Park neighborhood in Minneapolis.

=== Light rail transit ===
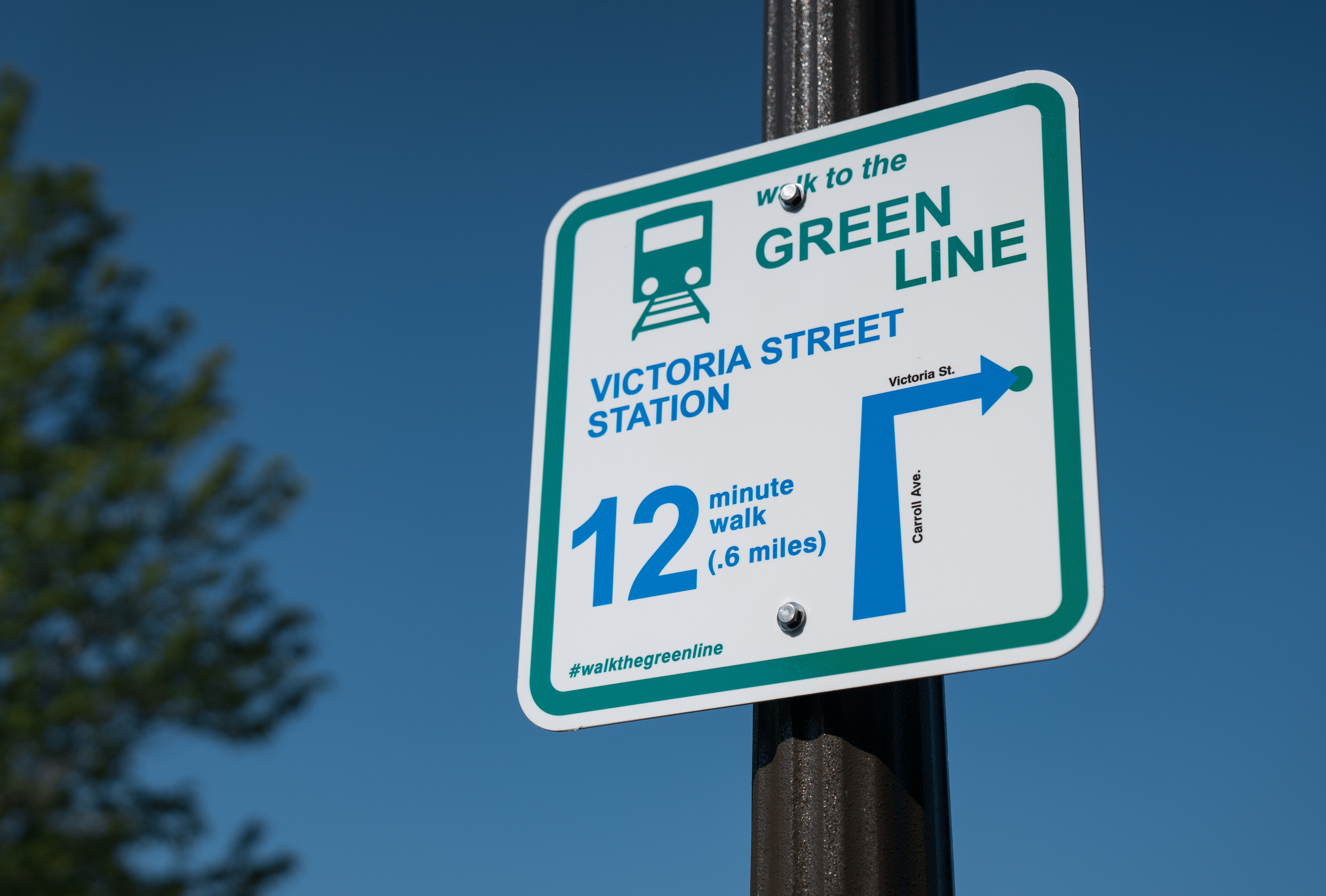
Light rail street sign

During the years of planning and preparation for the Green Line (the second main route of the Twin Cities Light Rail Transit system, originally known as the Central Corridor project), attention was re-focused on the Rondo Neighborhood and its history. Since the Green Line was planned to go on University Avenue, just a few blocks away from I-94, the same groups were affected. Communities were concerned about the past repeating itself. A number of groups formed in order to ensure that this process was different.

Future St. Paul Mayor Melvin Carter was among those who ran for and won the seats on the St. Paul City Council in 2007 for the main purpose of improving the Green Line project as it related to Rondo. A specific action taking by groups concerned about the Green Line was a lawsuit filed against local project planners and the Federal Transit Administration by the NAACP, Alliance for Metropolitan Stability, Rondo residents and businesses and other organizations including Pilgrim Baptist, the state's first Black church. They charged that the Metropolitan Council inadequately engaged in mitigating efforts on poor people and minorities, potentially repeating Rondo's results. From the actions including that lawsuit, three additional stops were added to better serve Rondo/Frogtown residents. Also, additional funds to address parking and business-loss concerns during the construction process were made available. On the national level, the Federal Transit Administration changed its so-called cost-effectiveness index, which had given preference to shorter travel times and longer distances between stops. Instead, under FTA administrator Peter Rogoff, transportation issues were being examined from a civil rights perspective. Social equity and livability factors, including economic development and congestion relief, were added to the decision-making process.

=== Reconnecting ===
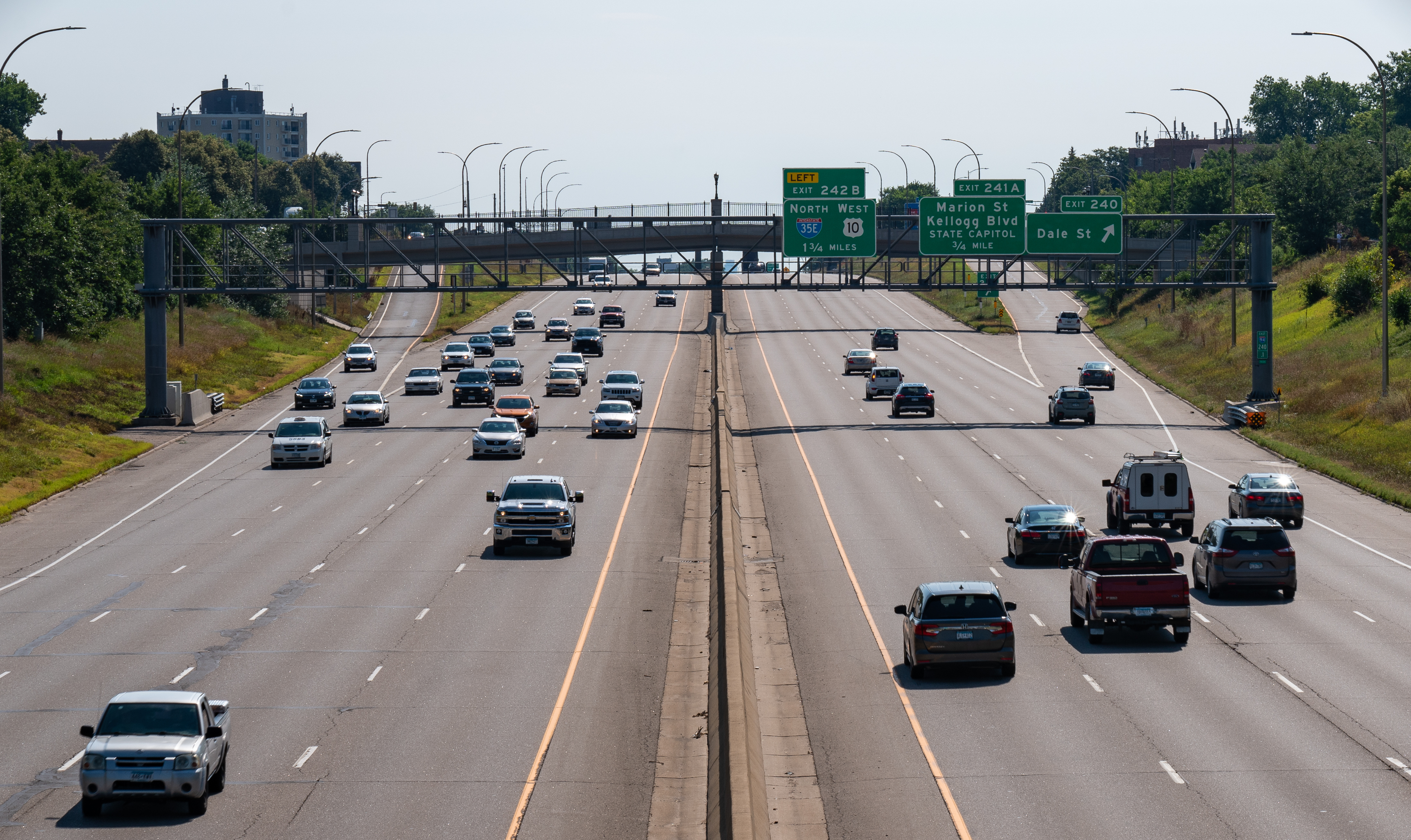
Interstate 94 at Dale Street

In 2016, MNDOT Commissioner Charlie Zelle and St. Paul Mayor Chris Coleman together formally apologized for the way the interstate construction was handled. (Note: "American freeways tended to twist and curve to avoid wealthy neighborhoods and then straightened out into swaths of destruction through the neighborhoods of the poor, the disenfranchised and the non-white," St. Paul Mayor Chris Coleman, 2015)

A land bridge, which would cover I-94 and reconnect the northern and southern halves of Rondo, has been under discussion the 2000s. At the federal level, the 'Infrastructure Investment and Jobs Act' passed in 2021 focused on infrastructure included the 'Reconnecting Communities' program, which seeks to address harms caused by transportation infrastructure. Pedestrian walkways over or under existing freeways are explicitly included as goals of that legislation. The Rondo Land Bridge freeway lid concept has been discussed in the Minnesota Legislature. It is envisioned as 15 to 21 acres of buildable land extending across I-94, possibly between Chatsworth Street and Grotto Street, or alternatively from Lexington Avenue to Rice Street.

== Legacy ==
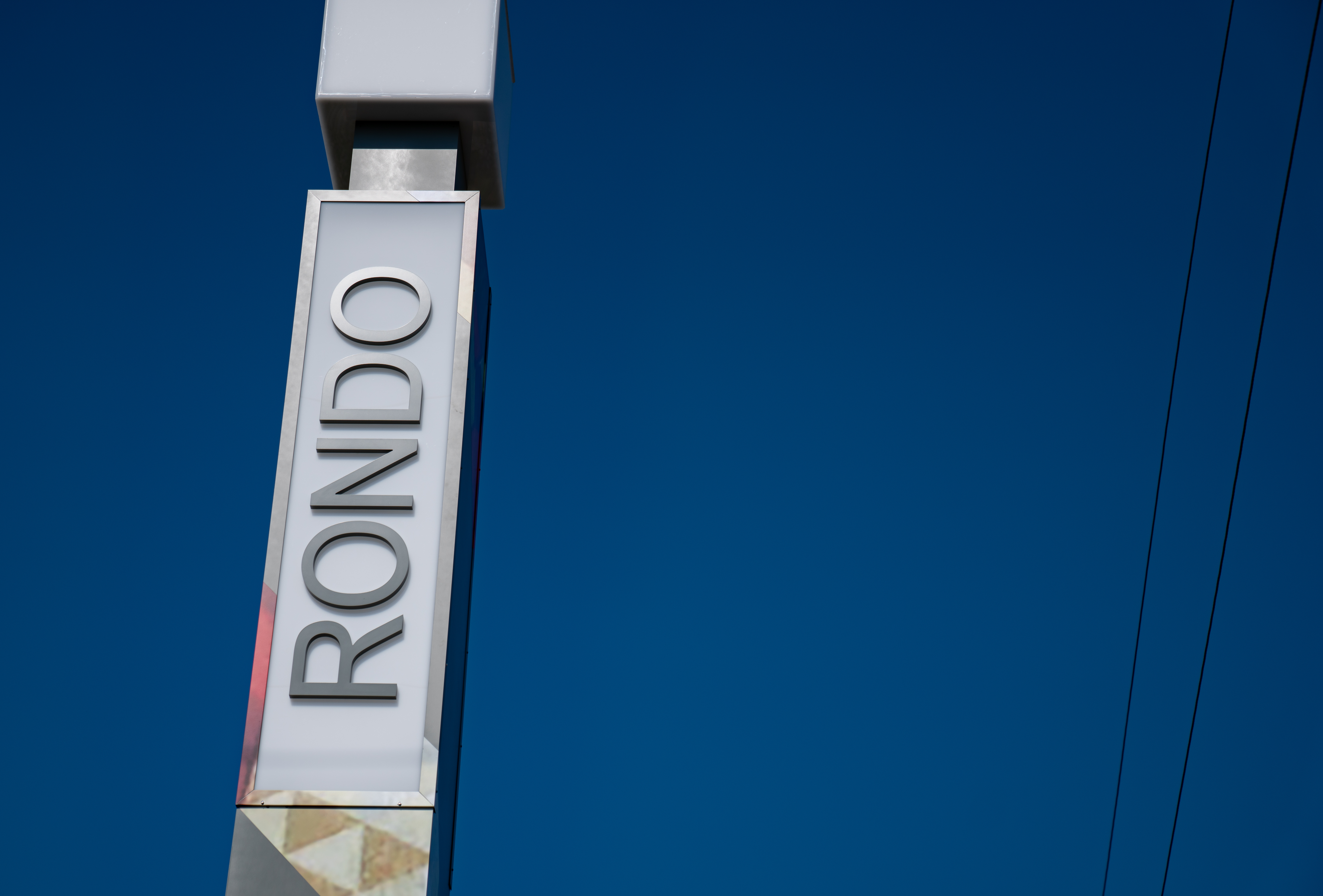
Rondo Neighborhood sign

Rondo Days is a weekend-long celebration of the spirit of the Rondo community, first held in 1983. Two prominent members of the Black community who were Rondo residents, Marvin Roger Anderson and Floyd G. Smaller, founded an organization called Rondo Avenue Inc to turn Rondo history into a current, ongoing awareness; they launched the annual festival in 1982. Initial celebrations included a parade and senior supper, the event has continued to grow and develop each year through the efforts of the Rondo-diaspora community and now also includes the Northern Lights Drill and Drum International, a competition that draws drill and drum teams nationwide.

In 2006, the St. Paul Public Library opened a new building at University and Dale Street to serve as both library and mixed-income housing. Called the Rondo Community Outreach Library, it holds special collections related to the Rondo neighborhood and its history.

Macalester College in St. Paul initiated a collaboration with Rondo Avenue, Inc. (RAI) to team-teach a multi-faceted "History Harvest" course about Rondo, within Macalester's emphasis on community-engaged curriculum, culminating in "Remembering Rondo: A History Harvest", with the partnership of the Macalester Civic Engagement Center (CEC). Students from the St. Paul High School for Recording Arts, in conjunction with the St. Paul Almanac and the St. Paul Neighborhood Network created the documentary Rondo: Beyond the Pavement. The work of Reconnect Rondo continues.

In 2017, three artists connected to Rondo: Hawona Sullivan Janzen, Clarance White, and Chris Scott, created the public art project Rondo Family Reunion. The three documented the histories of the Rondo Diaspora through lawn signs featuring historic photographs and poetry from community members. The project, which was sponsored by the McKnight Foundation, the Minnesota Arts and Cultural Heritage Fund, the Center for Urban & Regional Affairs, and Springboard for the Arts, featured live poetry readings and culminated in a printed book.

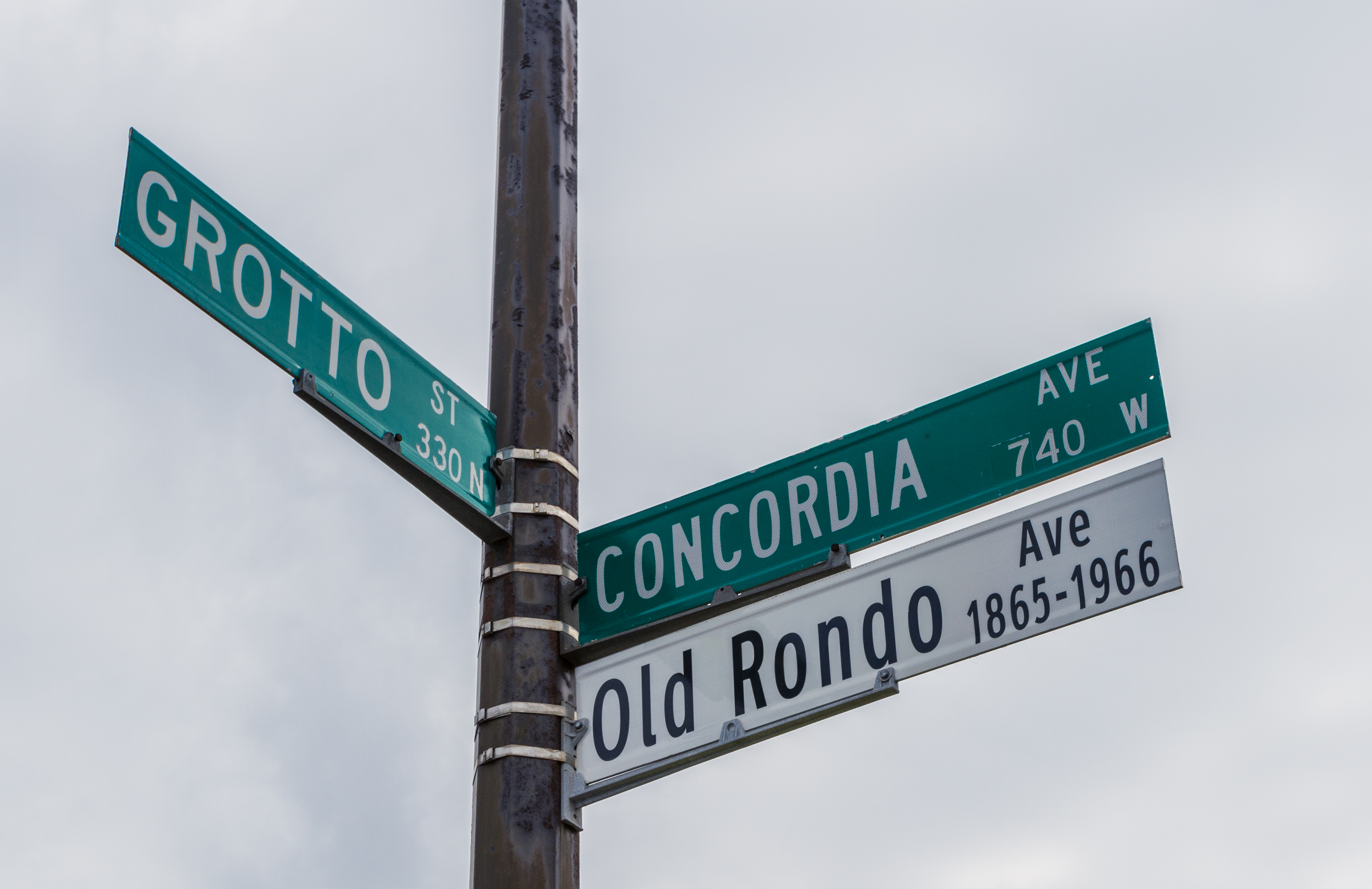
Old Rondo commemorative street sign

The Rondo Commemorative Plaza was installed in July 2016 on Old Rondo Avenue (Concordia Avenue) just west of North Fisk Street. It includes a vertical exhibit displaying the Rondo story, benches, a performance area, and a tower with a lit beacon that is visible from I-94. Funds were provided by a variety of sources, including a Community Development Block Grant from the City of St. Paul and donations from several local foundations and the 3M African-American Employee Network.

In 2017, the Minnesota History Theater presented a work called The Highwaymen to explore how freeway construction affected the neighborhood and people.

The history of Black baseball and the cultural significance of Rondo are included in the St. Paul Saints City of Baseball Museum, unveiled in 2019. Saints Senior VP and General Counsel Michael Goldklang: "We have a photo frame of the Rondo highlights. It talks about how players would come in and stay in hotels and played baseball... "Black baseball is central to the history of St. Paul."

In 2022, the Hallie Q. Brown Community Center released a board game to promote Rondo history. Called Rondo-opoly, the game design incorporates the traditions of Monopoly with the details replaced by historical facts about Rondo's history. The Hallie Q. Brown center, in operation since 1929, drew from its archives to prioritize historical locations and substantiate details about Rondo in creating the game.

== Notable residents ==
- Reverend Robert Hickman (1830 – 1900), founder of the Media related to Pilgrim Baptist Church (St. Paul, Minnesota) at Wikimedia Commons
- Roy Wilkins (1901 – 1981), Civil Rights activist
- Toni Stone (1921 – 1996), female professional baseball player
- Dave Winfield (b. 1951), professional baseball player
- Stacy Robinson (1962 – 2012), professional football player
- Melvin Carter (b. 1979), Saint Paul mayor
- Dua Saleh, musician and actor

== See also ==
- Lou Bellamy
- The Death and Life of Great American Cities
- Jane Jacobs
- Roy Wilkins Auditorium
