= Blair Flats =

- U.S. National Register of Historic Places
- U.S. Historic district – Contributing property
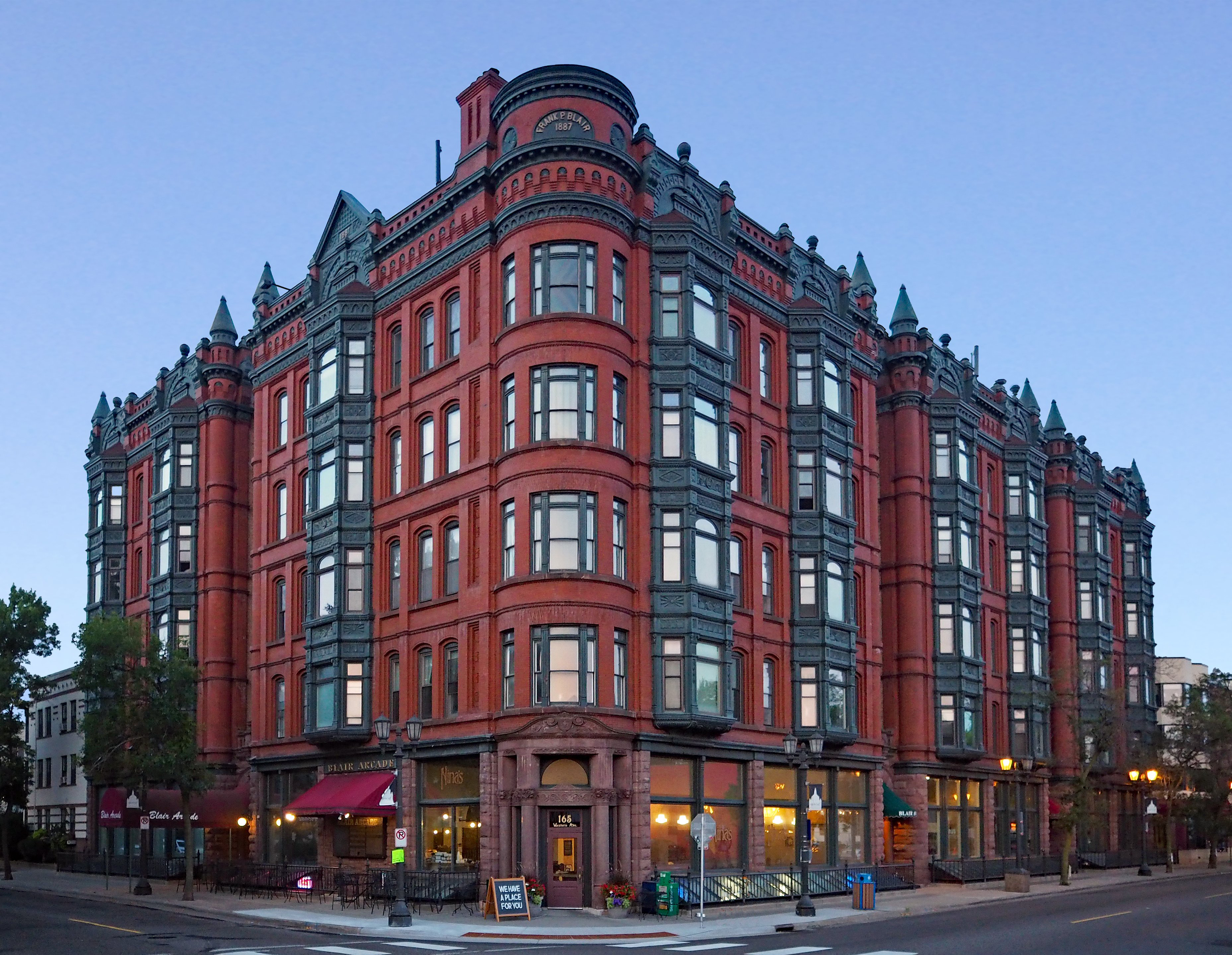
- Blair Flats from the northeast

- Location within Minnesota Location within the United States
- Location: 165 Western Avenue; Saint Paul, Minnesota
- Coordinates: 44°56′47.25″N 93°6′58.5″W
- Built: 1887
- Architect: Hermann Kretz and William H. Thomas
- Architectural style: Late Victorian
- Part of: Historic Hill District (ID76001067)
- NRHP reference No.: 75001006
- Added to NRHP: July 18, 1975

Blair Flats, also known as the Blair Arcade Building, is a Victorian residential building designed by Hermann Kretz and William H. Thomas in 1887, located in Saint Paul, Minnesota, United States. The building is located on the intersection of Western and Selby Avenues. It is also a contributing property to the Historic Hill District. Construction materials are sandstone and brick. The building has been used as apartments, hotel, and condominiums.

== History ==
Blair Flats was constructed in 1887 as apartments, with each unit consisting of five or six large rooms accessible from private halls. The parlors had large bay windows with stained glass transoms and a cherry-mantled fireplace. The kitchens were modern for the time with gas stoves. The building represented high Victorian architectural design and cost over $300,000.

In 1893, the apartments were converted into hotel rooms and suites and the building became the Albion Hotel. The lobbies were paneled with oak and beveled mirrors. In 1911, the building was purchased by Thomas Lowry and was renamed the Angus Hotel after one of Lowry's oil wells. He sold the building in 1918, and it changed hands several more times as te neighborhood changed. The building operated as a hotel from 1893 to 1971. Though deteriorated, the 1893 fixtures remained and were restored.

In 1985, the building reopened as a mixed-use complex of apartments, offices, and retail. From 2006 to 2012 the lower level of the building housed Common Good Books, an independent bookstore owned by Garrison Keillor.

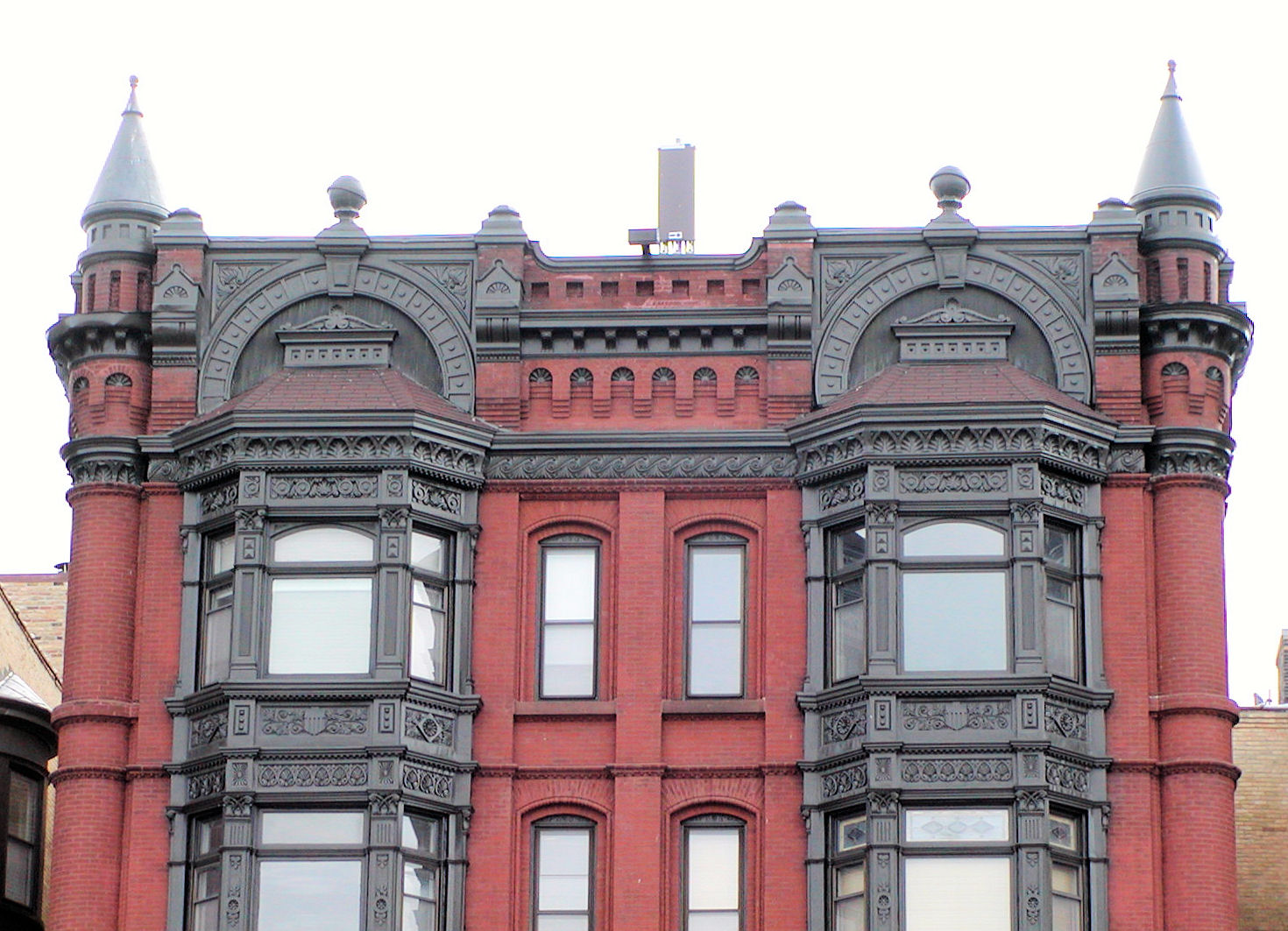
Detail of the elaborate roof

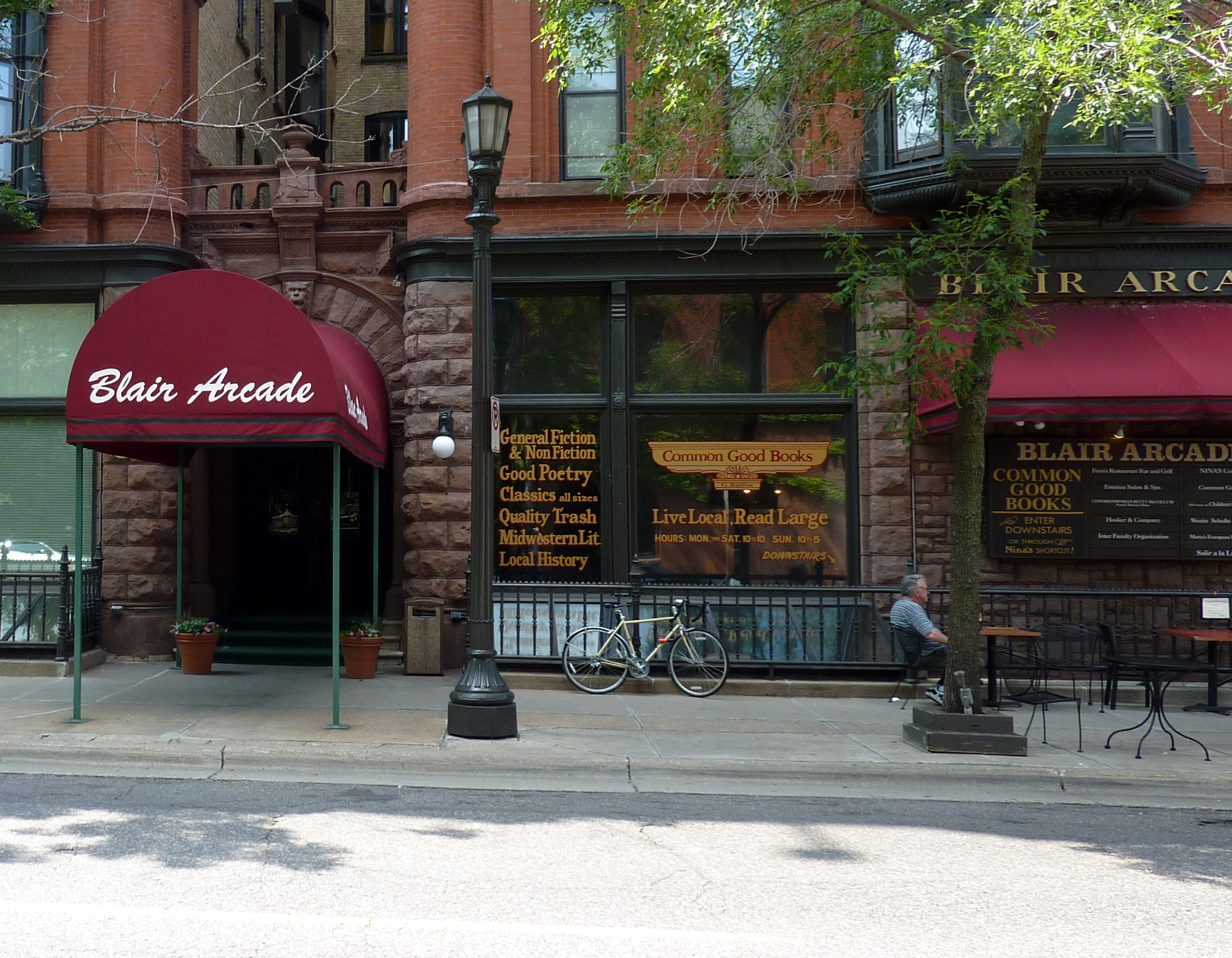
"Common Good Books, G. Keillor"
