= Hallie Q. Brown Community Center =

Not-for-profit social service agency

- Founded: 1929
- Type: Non Profit
- Legal status: Active
- Purpose: Community Center
- Headquarters: Saint Paul, Minnesota
- Location: 270 N Kent St, St. Paul, Minnesota 55102
- Origins: 1908
- Website: hallieqbrown.org

Hallie Q. Brown Community Center is an African-American not-for-profit social service agency located in the Rondo neighborhood of Saint Paul, Minnesota, US, founded in 1929. Its slogan is 'Lighthouse of the Community'. The Hallie Q. Brown Community Center (HQB) is one of the largest African American non-profit organizations in the state of Minnesota. The center is named for Hallie Quinn Brown (1849–1950) a famous Black educator, activist, orator and writer agitating for civil rights, and women's rights. She also called out the injustices of the convict lease system. The organization supports the community with a full range of services including early childhood education (preschool and daycare), before and after school care, basic needs (food shelf, clothing, supportive resources, etc.), senior programming, historical archives, and anti-racism and equity programming. HQB administers the Martin Luther King Service Center which consists of a little over half of the building and houses other agencies and organizations providing programming in the arts, recreation and other social and civic issues, including the nationally recognized Penumbra Theater Company. The City of Saint Paul administers the Martin Luther King Recreation Center, which consists of the remaining part of the overall building.

== Overview ==
The Hallie Q. Brown Community Center began as a settlement house aptly named Hallie Q. Brown House. It has been serving the community since 1929. It currently provides services every year to as many as 50,000 people, including food support, child care, senior programs, and cultural activities. It is also home to a historical archive of Rondo neighborhood information and resources. Programming of the center ranges from basic - food drives and clothing closet - to social, developmental and professional opportunities such as 'Prepare and Prosper' - free tax preparation services from January through April; and Project CHEER - free piano and guitar lessons - supported by the Schubert Club. They are also a fiscal agent, and support smaller organizations by providing mailboxes, phone lines, and office-space.

== Organization history ==
=== Context ===
The history of Black life in Minnesota extends back to the eighteenth century, with George Bonga and Dred Scott. Over 100 Black men fought for the North in the Civil War, and in 1868 the State of Minnesota gave Black men the right to vote. Some of the first Black community organizations included the Sons of Freedom, founded in 1968 to provide information on jobs, housing and apprenticeships to new residents of Minnesota. The Robert Banks Literary Society formed in 1875 for social issues exploration and discussion. Black residents of 15 counties formed the Minnesota Protective and Industrial League in 1887 in St. Paul, to support homeownership, jobs and education.

=== Founding ===
The origins of the Hallie Q. Brown Community Center date back to 1908, in the Rondo neighborhood. Black members of two St. Paul organizations (the Odd Fellows and the Masons) purchased six lots on Aurora Street between Kent and Mackubin, to organize efforts to serve the local Black community. An additional goal was to form more positive bonds with the white community. The first new organization resulting from these efforts was the Union Hall Association, which opened in 1914 and built a neighborhood center on one of the lots. The St. Paul Urban League and the YWCA working together supported programming there from 1923 to 1929. In 1929, the independent community center formed to continue its activities. Originally located in the former Central Avenue Branch of the YWCA at 598 Central Avenue, HQB moved in 1930 into a former Masonic Hall at Aurora and Mackubin. In 1972 the center moved to its current location in the Dr. Martin Luther King Jr. Center at Kent Street and Marshall Avenue.

=== Named for Hallie Quinn Brown ===
The center held an essay content to determine its name, with the winning essay on the subject of Hallie Quinn Brown. Hallie Quinn Brown was the daughter of slaves who were highly educated and very active in the Underground Railroad. After graduating from Wilberforce University (a historical Black college) in 1873, Hallie began her work as educator in the black community. She served as Dean of Women of Tuskegee Institute with Booker T. Washington during the 1892/1893 year. She helped found the National Association of Colored Women (NACW). She returned to St. Paul twice, in 1929 and in 1947, speaking to Black churches and organizations. Her most popular publication, “Homespun Heroines” is the collection of life portraits of 60 history making African American women.

=== Services ===
The center started off as an independent human services provider, and has grown into a multi-service center. HQB provides the services that the community needs, as demonstrated by participation and by leadership awareness. In the past, new or temporary activities have included participation in polio vaccine programs, AIDS prevention, COVID vaccinations, and public community forums. HQB provides administration of the MLK Center, which houses partners offering specialized services and programs. The Penumbra Theatre Company is also located in the MLK center. The city of St. Paul operates the MLK recreation center, also located in the MLK building. One of HQB's core programs is its food shelf and related services. HQB's food shelf is stocked with pantry items as well as fresh produce donated by local grocery program partners. The center incorporates volunteers into much of its activities. Ta-coumba Aiken and Seitu Jones have worked with the center on art shows for children at the center.

== Notable programs ==
=== Penumbra ===
The Hallie Q. Brown Community Center supported growth in its art programming including visual arts, music, literature, and theatre. As a result, the Black Arts Movement got its start and flourished. HQB's executive director at the time, Henry R. Thomas, formed a goal of launching a theater, and that became Penumbra. In 1976, the Comprehensive Employment and Training Act (CETA) awarded the Hallie Q. Brown Community Center a $150,000 grant to further develop its cultural arts programming. The CETA funding enabled the appointment of Lou Bellamy, a theatre arts graduate student at University of Minnesota, as the center's cultural arts director where he later founded the Penumbra Theatre Company. Penumbra transitioned to a separate organization in 1991, still located at the Martin Luther King Jr location.

=== Covid impact ===
The effect of the Covid pandemic on HQB has been intense, including a 400% increase in food-shelf usage. HQB increased their activities to meet that need, and also expanded their range to serve as a food hub for the Twin Cities. People from across the Twin Cities metro area made use of HQB's food shelf, including residents of Lakeville, Coon Rapids and Rochester. During the pandemic HQB provided between 50,000 and 100,000 pounds of food to other community partners every month. During the pandemic HQB did not hire additional staff, and had fewer volunteers than usual.

=== Hallie Q. Brown Archive Project ===
The Hallie Q. Brown Archive Project was completed in 2018, and its purpose is both to serve as a storehouse of history about the Rondo neighborhood and its members (including the center), and support awareness of Rondo's continuing legacy. It was sparked by a historical photograph of black men and women in tuxedos and evening gowns. When community members started to identify family members in the photo, the archive project was launched. (Note: the photo was of a gathering at the Sterling Club, the oldest Afro-American men’s social club in the country that still exists today.) Volunteer services and other support for the project was provided by BlueCrossBlueShield of Minnesota, the University of Minnesota, Macalester College, the Minnesota Historical Society and the Ramsey County Historical Society.
