= History of Saint Paul, Minnesota =

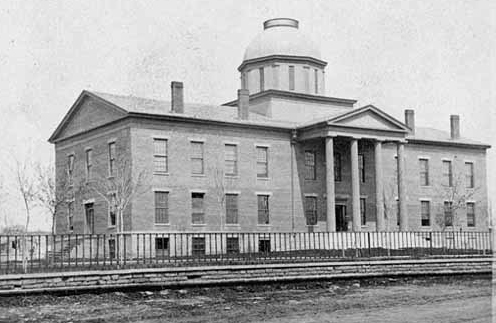
Minnesota's first capitol building, built in 1854, c.1860

Saint Paul is the second-largest city in the U.S. state of Minnesota, the county seat of Ramsey County, and the state capital of Minnesota. The origin and growth of the city were spurred by the proximity of Fort Snelling, the first major United States military installation in the area, as well as by the city's location on the northernmost navigable port of the Upper Mississippi River.

Fort Snelling, originally known as Fort Saint Anthony, was established in 1819, at the confluence of the Mississippi and Minnesota rivers in order to establish American dominance of the fur-trading industry on the rivers. As the whiskey trade started to flourish, military officers in Fort Snelling banned distillers from the land the fort controlled. Pierre "Pig's Eye" Parrant, a retired French Canadian fur trader turned bootlegger, was a particular source of irritation to military officers. In 1838, Parrant moved his bootlegging operation downstream about 5 miles (8.0 km) to Fountain Cave, in the north bank of the river near what is now Saint Paul's West Seventh Street neighborhood. There, Parrant established the area that became known as "L'Œil de Cochon" (French for "Pig's Eye"), and the location began to be settled by fellow French Canadians, as well as others exiled from Fort Snelling. An 1837 treaty with local Native Americans secured the city for white settlement. In 1841, the settlement was named Saint-Paul by Father Lucien Galtier, a priest from France, in honor of Paul the Apostle. By the early 1840s the area had become important as a trading center, a stopping point for settlers heading west, and was known regionally as Pig's Eye or Pig's Eye Landing. The Minnesota Territory was formalized in 1849 with Saint Paul as its capital. Saint Paul was incorporated as a city in 1854, and in 1858, Minnesota was admitted as the 32nd state of the union with Saint Paul as its capital.

Natural geography played a role in Saint Paul's settlement and development as a trade and transportation center. The Mississippi River valley surrounding the city has numerous stone bluffs lining both sides of the river. Saint Paul developed around Lambert's Landing, the last easily accessible point to unload boats coming upriver, some 14 miles (23 km) downstream from Saint Anthony Falls, the geographic feature that defined the location of Minneapolis and its prominence as the "Mill City". This made Saint Paul a gateway to the Upper Midwest for settlers westbound to the Minnesota frontier or the Dakota Territory. In 1858, more than 1,000 steamboats unloaded cargo and passengers at Saint Paul. The Saint Anthony Trail, a cart and wagon road, led from Saint Paul to the Red River valley. The trail was followed by numerous railroads headquartered in Saint Paul, such as the Great Northern Railway and Northern Pacific Railway, which are today part of the BNSF Railway. For well over 100 years, Saint Paul was a frontier town and a railroad town. By the late 20th century, the city became more influenced by commerce, as well as its role as the state capital. It has been called "The Last City of the East".

The city's character has been defined by its people, beginning with Indigenous people such as the Kaposia band of the Mdewakanton Dakota, who have for centuries called the area that is now Saint Paul their home. Throughout its history, first-generation immigrants have been a dominant force in Saint Paul, introducing their languages, religions, and cultures. The influx of peoples is illustrated by the city's institutions, built by French, French Canadian, German, Swedish, Irish, Czech, Austro-Hungarian, Polish, Italian, Mexican, Somali, and Hmong people.

== Geological history ==
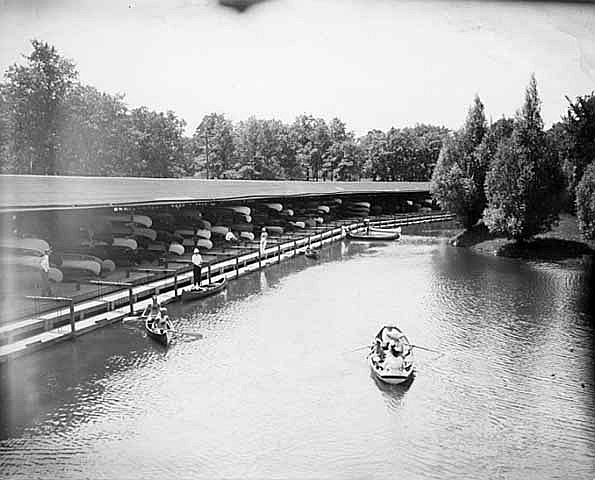
Lake Phalen in 1905

During Upper Cambrian and Ordovician time, about 505 to 438 million years ago, shallow tropical seas covered much of then-equatorial southeastern Minnesota. During this time, the sedimentary rocks that constitute the bedrock of St. Paul were deposited. The most visible of these are the 156-foot (48 m) to 166-foot (51 m) thick layer of St. Peter Sandstone, the lowest layer of sedimentary rock above the Mississippi River in Saint Paul, which is overlain by a thin—3-foot (1 m) to 5.5-foot (2 m) thick—layer of Glenwood Shale and capped by a 28-foot (9 m) thick layer of Platteville Limestone. These units are overlain by the fossiliferous Decorah Shale, which is in some places completely eroded and in others up to 95 feet (29 m) thick, and exposed at the brickyards, a popular fossil hunting location in Lilydale Park. All the units exposed on the surface in St. Paul are of Ordovician age. Marine fossils can be seen embedded in limestone structures, such as the Henry Hastings Sibley House.

About 20,000 years ago, the area was covered by the Superior Lobe of the Laurentide Ice Sheet, which left the St. Croix moraine on the Twin Cities as it receded. Later the Grantsburg Sublobe of the Des Moines Lobe also covered the area. These thick layers of ice cut through the Platteville limestone cap rock with tremendous force, forming tunnel valleys, and released glacial meltwater. The result was a series of troughs in the limestone, which were filled by glacial till and outwash deposit as the glaciers receded. Sometimes the sediment was mixed with huge chunks of ice, which left voids, or kettles, in the soil. These kettles later filled with water and became Lake Como and Lake Phalen.

Glacial River Warren was a prehistoric river that drained Lake Agassiz in central North America between 11,700 and 9,400 years ago. Lake Agassiz, which was up to 600–700 feet (~200 m) deep, and at various times covered areas totaling over 110,000 square miles (~300,000 km^{2}), was formed from the meltwaters of the Laurentide Ice Sheet during the Wisconsonian glaciation of the last ice age. This lake's enormous outflow carved a wide valley now occupied by the much smaller Minnesota River and the Upper Mississippi River below its confluence with the Minnesota. Blocked by an ice sheet to the north, the lake water rose until about 9,700 years Before Present (BP), when it overtopped the Big Stone Moraine, a ridge of glacial drift left by the receding glacier, at the location of Browns Valley, Minnesota. The lake's outflow was catastrophic at times, creating a wide valley to Saint Paul, where the massive River Warren Falls once graced the landscape. Over 1700 years this waterfall retreated upstream and undercut the Mississippi at the site of Fort Snelling. The falls then split. The Mississippi falls migrated upstream to form Saint Anthony Falls and create Minnehaha Falls in Minneapolis. The River Warren falls receded west in the Minnesota River valley until they reached an older buried river valley about two miles (3 km) west of the confluence, where the falls were extinguished. The high bluffs on either side of the river represent the channel dug by the River Warren as it carried massive volumes of water through Saint Paul.

== First people ==
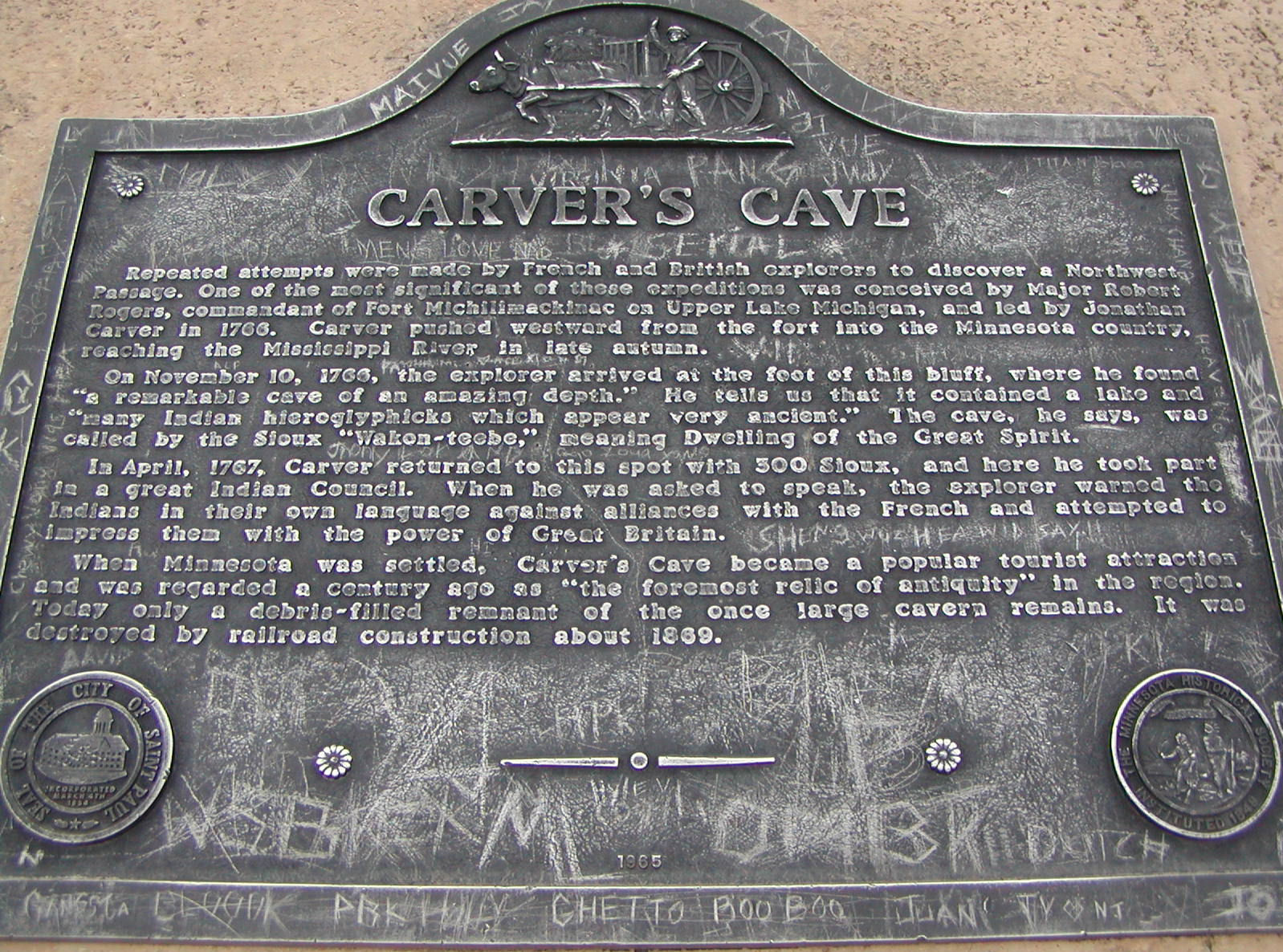
Plaque above Carver's Cave

About 2,000 years ago, as many as 37 burial mounds were constructed by the Hopewell culture, one of several Native American Mound builders at present-day Indian Mounds Park. The dead were buried with artifacts, indicating a religious tradition. The Hopewell culture's mounds were built in a distinctive fashion, burying the deceased's ashes; the Dakota people later used the same site to bury their dead, wrapping the bodies in animal skins. The Dakota lived near the site of the mounds in the village of Kaposia. Below the mounds was a large cave at the base of the bluff. The Dakota called Carver's Cave "Wakan Tipi" ("sacred lodge", or "dwelling of the sacred"). Petroglyphs of rattlesnakes and bears were cut into the sandstone walls. After the 1837 Treaty of St. Peters, the roughly 200 Dakota living on the bluffs of Saint Paul vacated the area and moved to the west side of the Mississippi River. The land was soon colonized by French Voyageurs, who staked claims to plots on Dayton's Bluff.

Dakota people refer to the area encompassing Saint Paul as Bdóte, which they considered a site of creation.

== European-American settlement ==
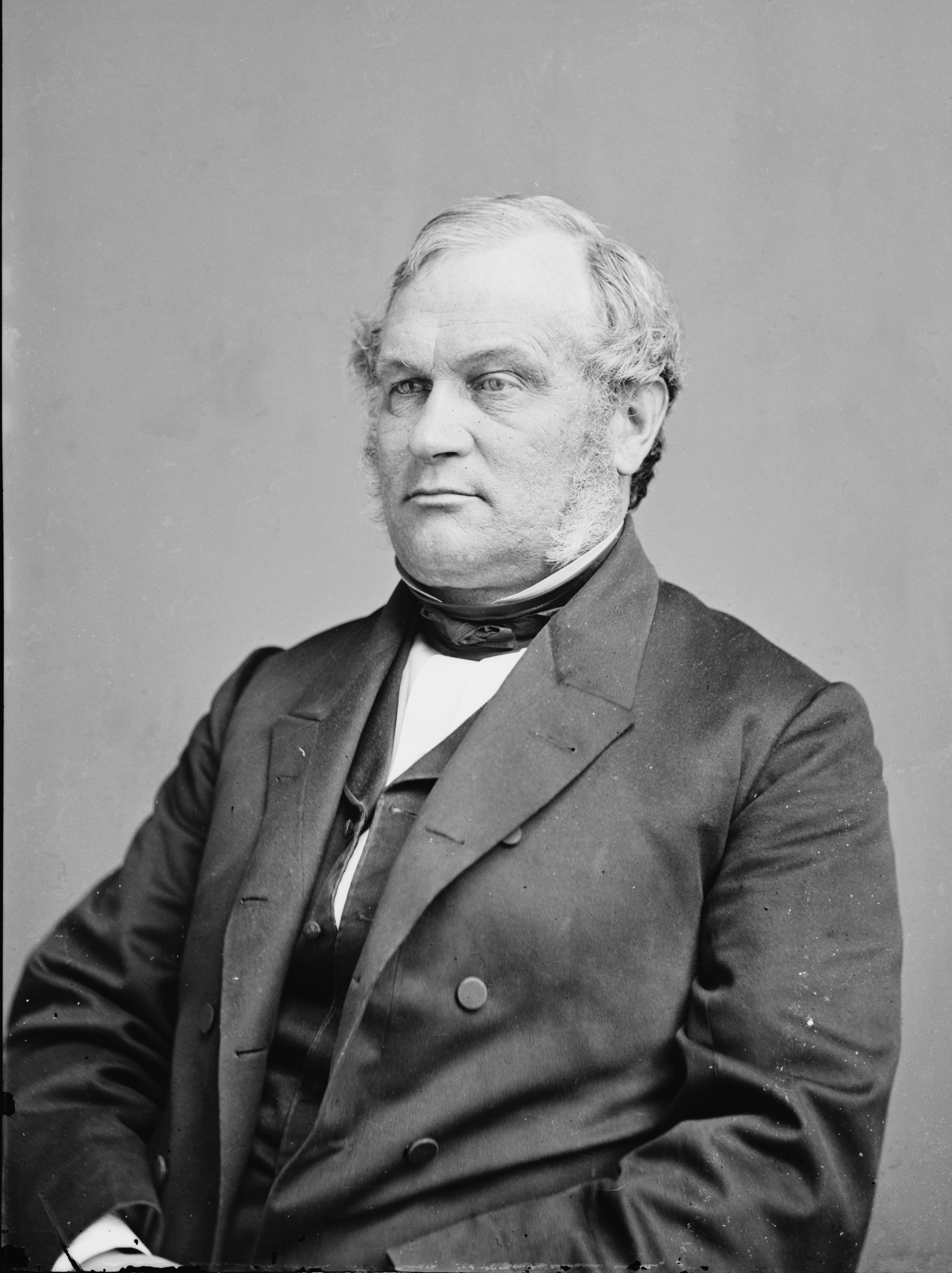
Alexander Ramsey, Saint Paul's fifth mayor

England claimed the land east of the Mississippi and France, then Spain, and again France claimed the land west of the river as further territory of New France. In 1787, land on the east side of the river became part of the Northwest Territory. Between the 1780s and 1800s, Spanish traders from St. Louis traded through the region, including Manuel Lisa and José María Vigó (also known as Francisco Vigó). From 1837 to 1848, Saint Paul grew from a few traders of mostly French and French Canadian origins, with tents and shacks on the riverside, to a small town with settlers starting to put down roots; in 1840, the town had only nine cabins scattered between the Upper and Lower Landings. Some were members of Manitoba's failed Red River Colony. They were soon joined by first-generation American pioneers. No structures have survived from this period. In 1841, Father Lucien Galtier established a Catholic chapel, Saint Paul's Chapel, on the bluffs above the landing (near present-day Second Street and Cedar Street), naming it in honor of his favorite saint and because of the pairing with Saint Peter's Church in Mendota, 5 miles (8 km) upstream and across the river. While it is said that the area had until that time been called "Pig's Eye" (French: L'Oeil du Cochon) or "Pig's Eye Landing" after the tavern of settler Pierre "Pig's Eye" Parrant, the landing by the chapel gradually became named known as "Saint Paul's Landing" and the chapel's name was gradually applied to the entire settlement. The name Saint Paul was first used in official records at the marriage of Vetel and Adele Guerin on January 26, 1841. In 1847, the Baptist schoolteacher Harriet Bishop came from Vermont (via New York City) and opened the city's first school in a cabin at St. Peter Street and Kellogg Boulevard. There she taught children of diverse ethnic, racial, and religious backgrounds and supported the temperance movement. Harriet Island was named for her. In 1849, the Minnesota Territory was formalized and Saint Paul was named its capital. Justus Ramsey's older brother, Philadelphia politician Alexander Ramsey, moved there to become the first territorial governor. In 1850, the city narrowly survived a proposed law to move the capital to Saint Peter when territorial legislator Joe Rolette absconded with the approved bill.

== Early boom years, 1849–1860 ==
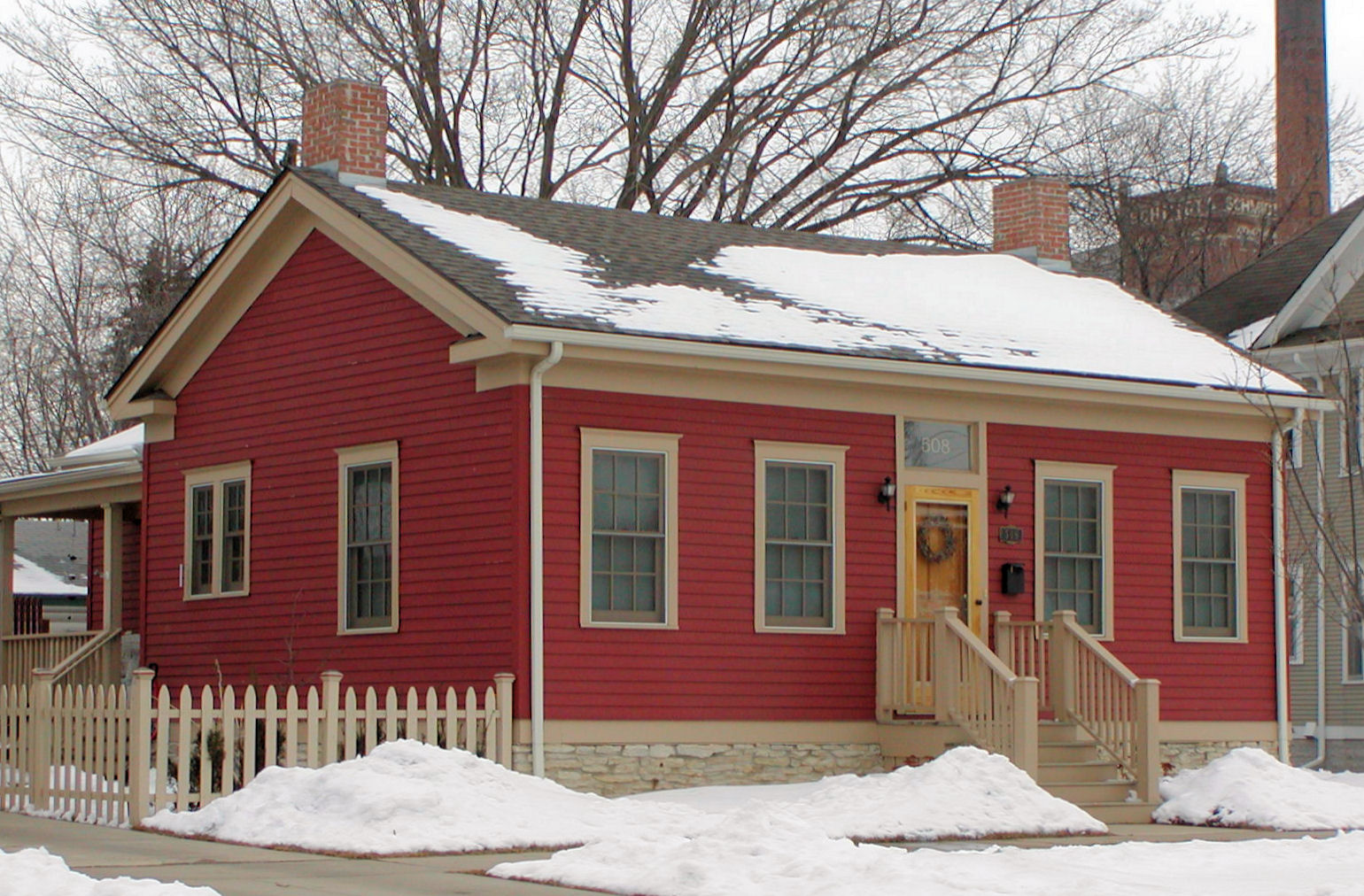
William Dahl House (1858). Ninety percent of homes from this era were wood-frame construction

In the decade following its designation as the territorial capital, Saint Paul's population grew from 900 in 1849 to 10,000 in 1860. William Williams described this boom town during a visit on June 14, 1849:

awoke early, found out Boat landed at St. Paul's discharging flour. I took a walk up the steep bluff and took a view of the town generally. The Upper or new town is laid out on a wild looking place situated on high bluffs which have a steep face to the River & Rocks projecting. The lower, or Old French town, is composed of about 10 or 15 houses, some of them bark roofs. In this part is found Half breed Indians & French and Canadian French. This part stands on a lower ground just above a ravine where Carver's Cave is. Site of upper town is more broken and it stands on a succession of benches of sand. There is a great many of people here. Many of them have for a covering their wagons and tents. There is two large frame hotels going up and a great many small frame building scattered among the bushes, for the greater part of the ground where the new town stands is not yet grubbed out, full of hazel bushes and scrub oaks. They area asking as high as $500 for lots. I think they will have a great deal of work to do here before they will have things as they should be. There is a slough 100 yards wide between the town and the river, over which they build a causeway to get from the River to the town. Between the river and the slough there is barely room for three or four warehouses. Two are here erecting.

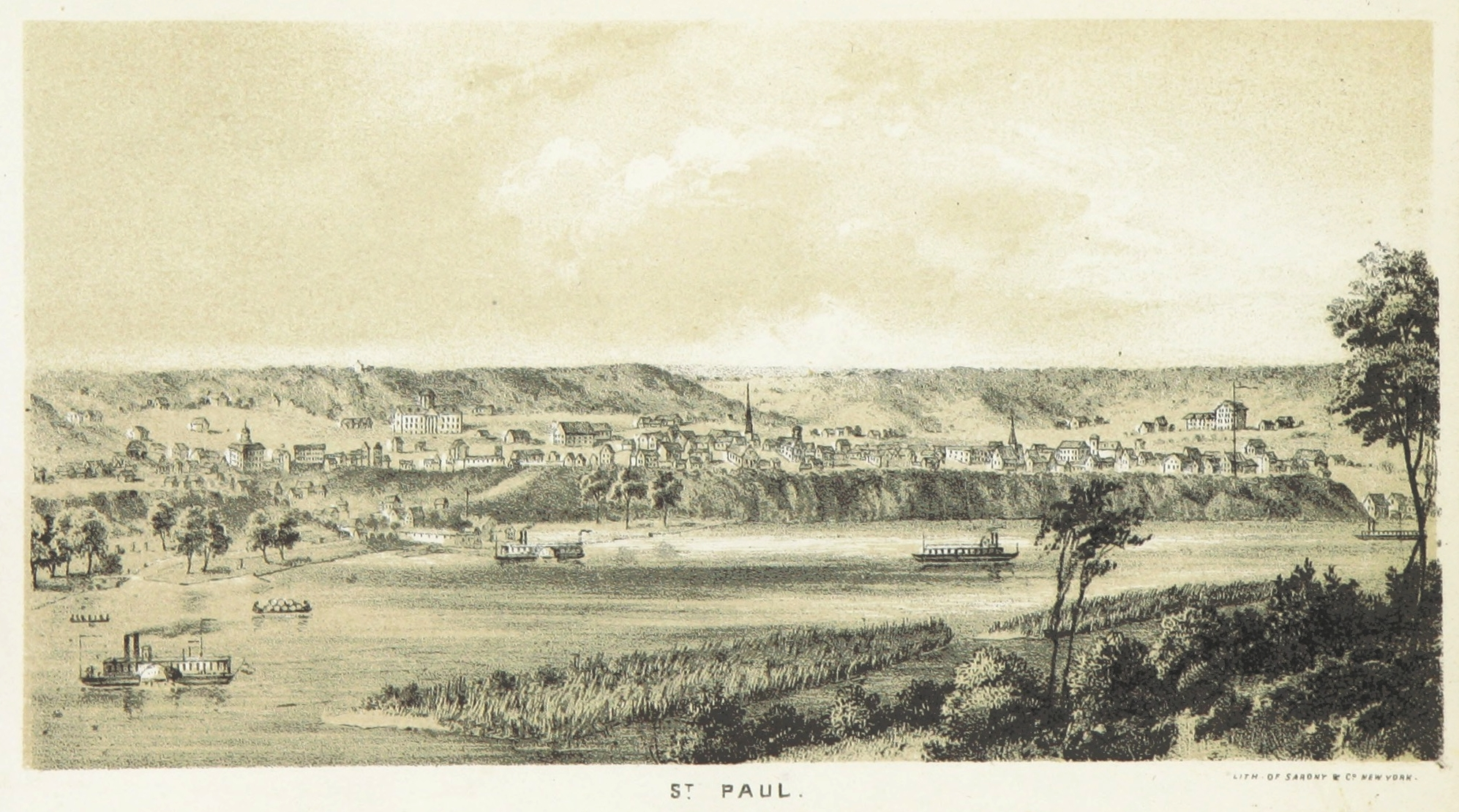
An illustration of the city from the 1856 book Minnesota and Its Resources by John Wesley Bond, held by the British Library.

Minnesota's first newspaper, the Minnesota Pioneer, the forerunner of today's St. Paul Pioneer Press, was established by James M. Goodhue in 1849. Just west of downtown Saint Paul is the neighborhood of Irvine Park; it was platted by John Irvine and Henry Mower Rice in 1849, and Saint Paul's oldest house, the Charles Symonds House (1850) is there. Other surviving homes from this period include the Justus Ramsey Stone House (1851), the Benjamin Brunson House (1856), the William Dahl House (1858), the David Luckert House (1858), and the Johan and Maria Magdalena Schilliger House (1859–1862). By mid-decade, a primitive capitol, a courthouse (a Greek Revival building designed by David Day), and a small prison had been built. The first bridge to cross the Mississippi River in Saint Paul was the Wabasha Street Bridge, a wooden Howe Truss bridge completed in 1859. Saint Paul saw early population growth from many regions and different ethnic groups. But a principal factor in its early population growth was the Quebec diaspora of the 1840s-1930s, in which a million French Canadians moved to the US, principally New England, Minnesota, Wisconsin, and Michigan. As the population grew, so too did religious and cultural institutions. German-Jewish pioneers formed Saint Paul's first synagogue in 1856 and the German cultural society Leseverein built Athenaeum, a Deutsches Haus for theatrical productions. In the early 1850s, the city's Catholic parish was divided into three factions; the French, German, and Irish groups each held services in their native tongues in one building. By 1856, the Diocese allowed the German Catholics to have their own parish, and the first Assumption Church was built. A Presbyterian minister founded the Baldwin School in 1853 and the College of Saint Paul in 1854; these later combined to become Macalester College. The city's musical traditions began with informal concerts in homes; pianos and melodeons were brought up the river by steamship. The first telegraph line reached Saint Paul in 1860.

== Full-steam growth ==
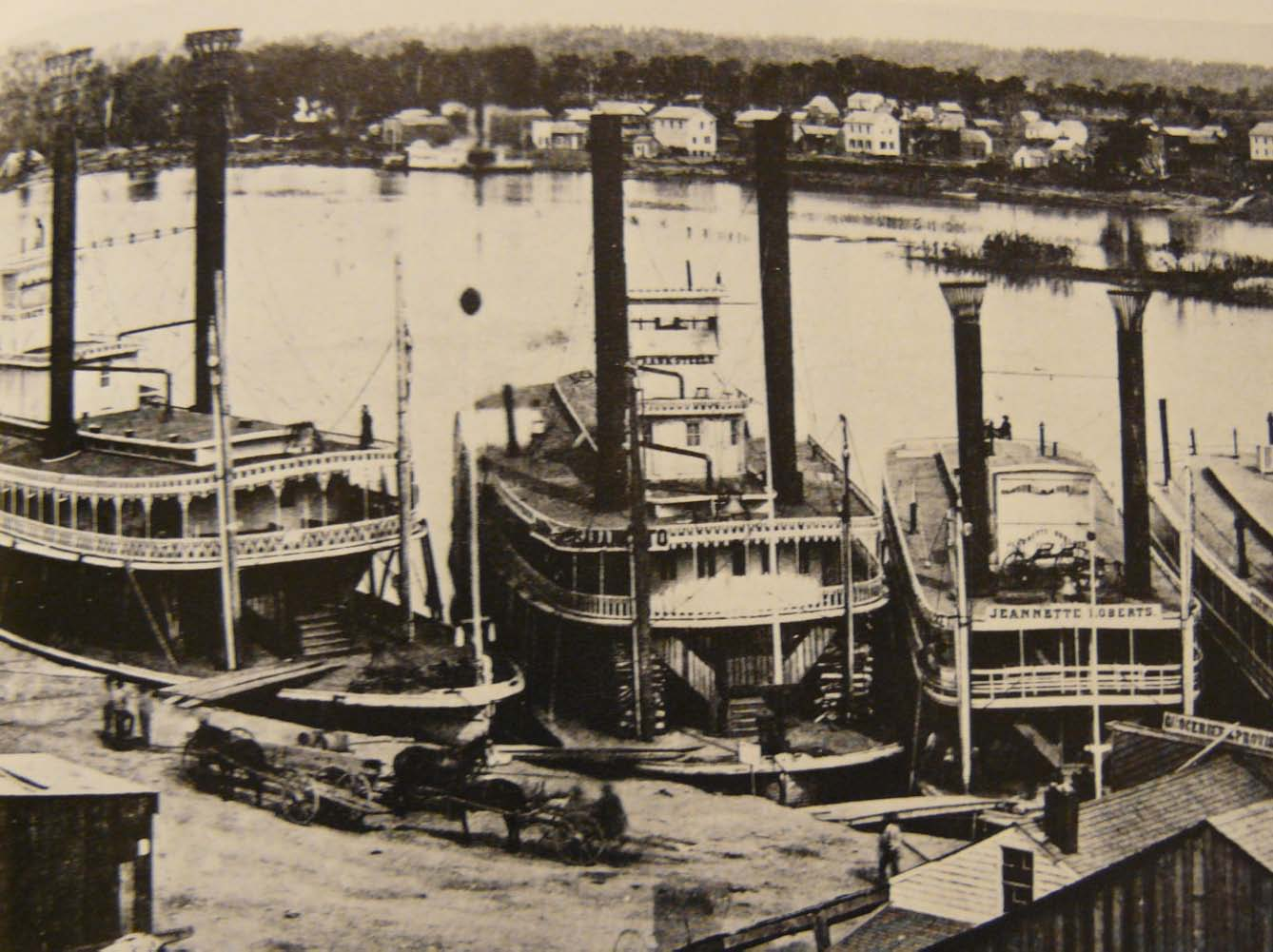
steamboats docked at Saint Paul in 1858

As Saint Paul grew, and its close neighbors Saint Anthony and Minneapolis grew even faster, the docks at Lower Landing and Upper Landing bustled with activity. The state population reached 200,000 by 1860, and most of those had arrived by riverboat, disembarking in Saint Paul. Farms were staked out in the vast countryside, including the Davern Farm (1862) and the Spangenberg Farm (1864). Wealthy businessmen such as James C. Burbank, the owner of the Minnesota Stage Company, which held a statewide monopoly controlling 1,600 miles (2,575 km) of stage-lines by 1865, started to spend their fortunes building grand estates. Burbank's Home (1862–1865) was one of the first mansions to be built high on the bluffs on Summit Avenue. By the end of the 19th century, his was only one of hundreds of impressive edifices in the Historic Hill District, the West Summit Avenue Historic District, the Woodland Park District, Dayton's Bluff, and the Irvine Park Historic District, where the powerful and wealthy resided.

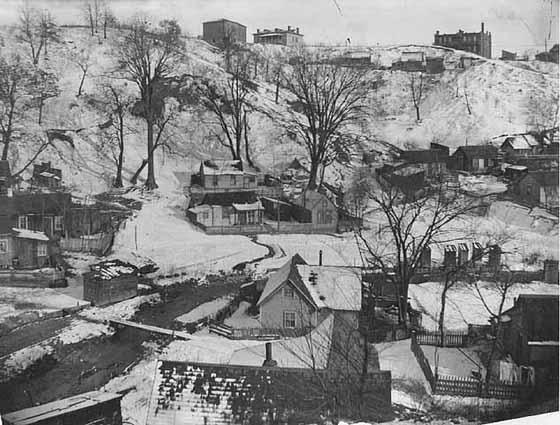
Swede Hollow, ca 1910

On the east side, new immigrants from Sweden with little wealth and poor English language skills settled in the ravine of Phalen's Creek, or Swede Hollow. The creek, named for Edward Phelan, runs from Lake Phalen to the Mississippi. Many lived in shanties in the creek valley, which served as an open sewer; the creek also provided water power for industries such as Excelsior Brewery (later Hamm's Brewery). Connemara Patch was a similar community for Irish immigrants just downstream.

The downtown area was home to several well-known brothels; the first opened in 1868, providing employment for some women in the untamed frontier town. One stylish madam, Mary Robinson, reported property worth $77,000 in 1870. Others were not so fortunate. Kate Hutton was shot and killed by a lover, and presumably other sex workers were victims of violence; Henrietta Charles died of syphilis at age 38. In 1872 Horace Cleveland visited the city and proposed a citywide park system; shortly thereafter Lake Como was purchased, eventually becoming the anchor of Como Park, Zoo, and Conservatory. In 1899, the city also purchased Lake Phalen.

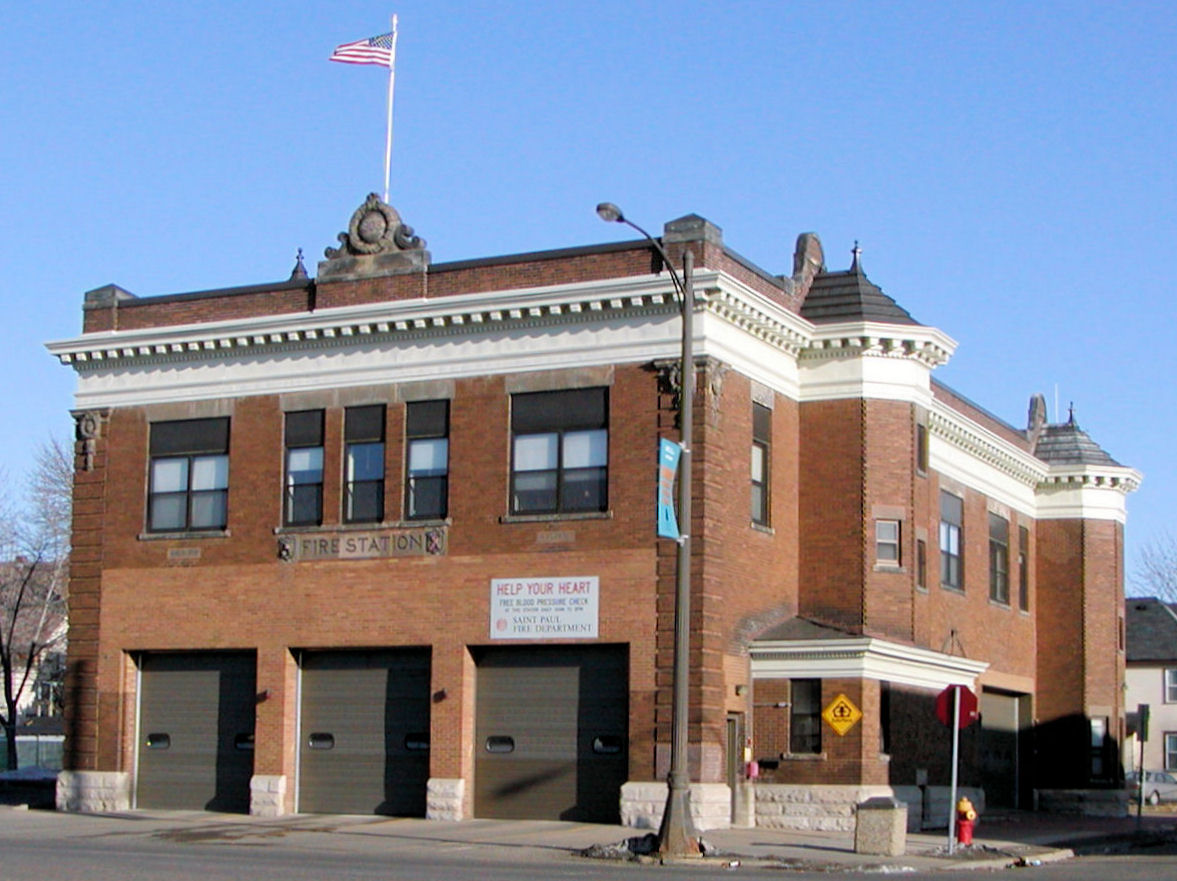
Fire station on University Avenue

By 1877, the volunteer fire department was disbanded in favor of a paid department. The volunteers had served the city since 1854, but the building boom necessitated a full-time department. Horse-drawn streetcars and even a few cable cars covered 20 miles (32 km) of city streets by 1880, but by 1891 they were all replaced by electric streetcar lines. The outlying neighborhoods grew out of the placement of the streetcar lines and short lines, Merriam Park in 1882, Macalester Park in 1883, Saint Anthony Park in 1885, and Groveland in 1890. In 1885 a New York reporter wrote that Saint Paul was "another Siberia, unfit for human habitation" in winter. Offended by this attack, the Saint Paul Chamber of Commerce decided to not only prove that Saint Paul was habitable but that its citizens were very much alive during winter. Thus was born the Saint Paul Winter Carnival. In 1886 King Boreas the First was crowned and the first Winter Carnival commenced. This festival also featured an ice castle, an elaborate creation made from the ice of Minnesota lakes, which has evolved into an internationally recognized icon of the festival. Foreign-language newspapers flourished, with local publications in German, French, Norwegian, Swedish, Danish, Polish, and Czech. African-Americans read The Appeal and Jewish immigrants read the Jewish Weekly.

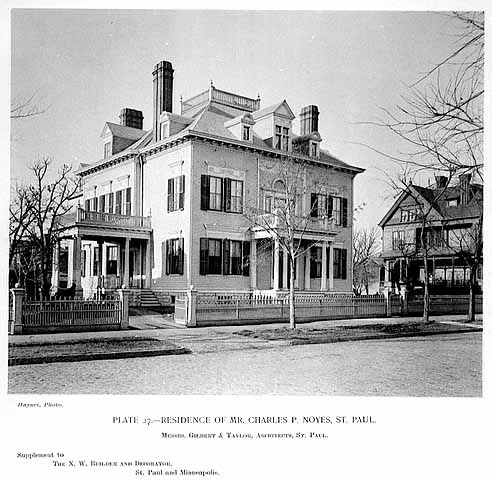
Residence of St. Paul merchant Charles Phelps Noyes, Virginia Street, 1890

Convenient transportation and an increasingly dense population contributed to an outbreak of typhoid fever in 1898. Soldiers mustering for the Spanish–American War were encouraged by 40,000 visitors, and 500 soldiers took ill from the exposure. By the turn of the century, resentment of the newest immigrants began to take hold. Henry A. Castle wrote that the earliest immigrants, primarily from the British Isles, Germany, Scandinavia, Switzerland, the Netherlands, Belgium, and France easily reached the standards expected of them. In contrast, by the 1880s, most new immigrants were unskilled workers from southern Europe, eastern Europe, and Russia. He described them as illiterate, unable to assimilate into the city's culture, and often without families. He said they drained the economy by working in the US and sending money back to their homelands.

Landmark Center was built in 1902 and originally served as the Federal Court House and Post Office for the Upper Midwest. It is now an arts and culture center. John Dillinger, Machine Gun Kelly, and Baby Face Nelson were tried in the building.

Saint Paul circa 1900–1910

== The state capitol ==
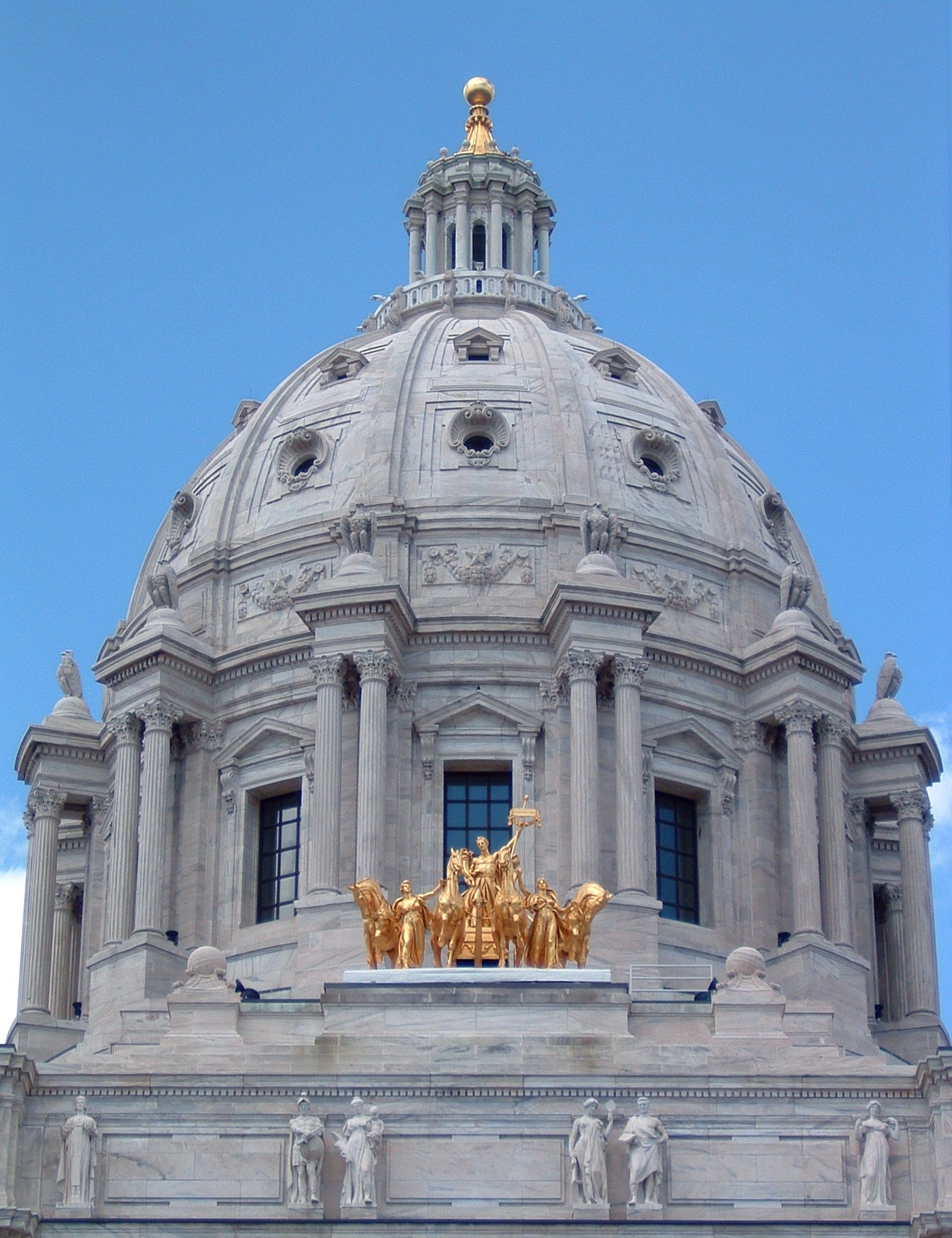
Capitol dome

Much of Saint Paul's vibrancy can be attributed to its status as the seat of state government. Capitol buildings were built in 1854 and 1882. But by the turn of the century, the third state capitol was under construction. The building was designed by Cass Gilbert and modeled after Saint Peter's Basilica in Rome—the unsupported marble dome is the second largest in the world, after Saint Peter's. At a cost of US$4.5 million, it opened in 1905. The exterior is made of Georgian marble and Saint Cloud granite. The interior walls are constructed of 20 different types of stone, including Mankato limestone. Above the southern (main) entrance to the building is a gilded quadriga called the Progress of the State which was sculpted by Daniel Chester French and Edward Clark Potter. It was completed and raised to the roof of the capitol in 1906. On the floor of the rotunda under the dome is a large star, representing the "North Star State". Above is a 6-foot (2 m) crystal chandelier. Art-work and gold-leaf are used liberally to decorate the legislative structure. The building's opulence is testimony to the great wealth the state generated at that time.

== Commerce and industry ==
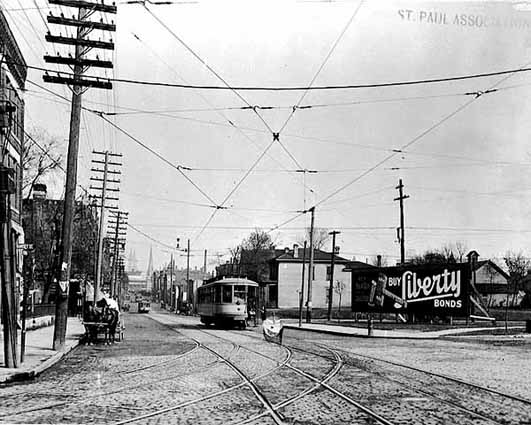
West Seventh Street 1918

As Minneapolis boomed as a milling city, Saint Paul flourished in financing and commerce. Brewers Anthony Yoerg and Theodore Hamm arrived with their German recipes for beer and found a thirsty population here. Bohn Manufacturing Company, a cabinet-maker, rode the wave as households replaced their ice boxes with refrigerators, becoming Seeger Refrigerator Company, eventually to be bought out by Whirlpool Corporation. In 1906 the Minnesota Mining and Manufacturing Company moved from Duluth to Saint Paul, later to become 3M, a Fortune 500 company. Banks financed railroads, mills, and housing for the booming economy and burgeoning population. Grand buildings such as the Germania Bank Building (1889), the Manhattan Building (1889), the Merchants National Bank (1892), and Pioneer and Endicott Buildings (1889–1890) soared in Lowertown, where arriving businessmen and new immigrants couldn't help but be impressed by them. Blocks of Victorian storefronts with upper-level apartments sprouted along the city streets. Some surviving ones include the Schornstein Grocery and Saloon (1884), the Walsh Building (1888), the Rochat-Louise-Sauerwein Block (1885–1895), and the Otto W. Rohland Building (1891). With wealth and leisure time, cultural institutions emerged, such as the Shubert Theatre now Fitzgerald Theater. Andrew Carnegie funded three libraries in the city: the Saint Anthony Park, Riverview, and Arlington Hills libraries, while James J. Hill endowed the Saint Paul Public Library/James J. Hill Reference Library. In 1924 the Ford Motor Company opened the Twin Cities Assembly Plant; the site is located on the Mississippi River adjacent to a company-owned dam, which generates hydroelectric power. Somewhat unique to this site are the sandstone tunnels beneath the 125-acre (0.51 km^{2}) factory. Ford mined silica to make glass for the automobiles produced here, leaving an extensive tunnel system deep into the river-side bluffs. The plant was converted to produce armored vehicles during World War II.

== Higher education ==
Higher education has played a prominent part in the city's history.

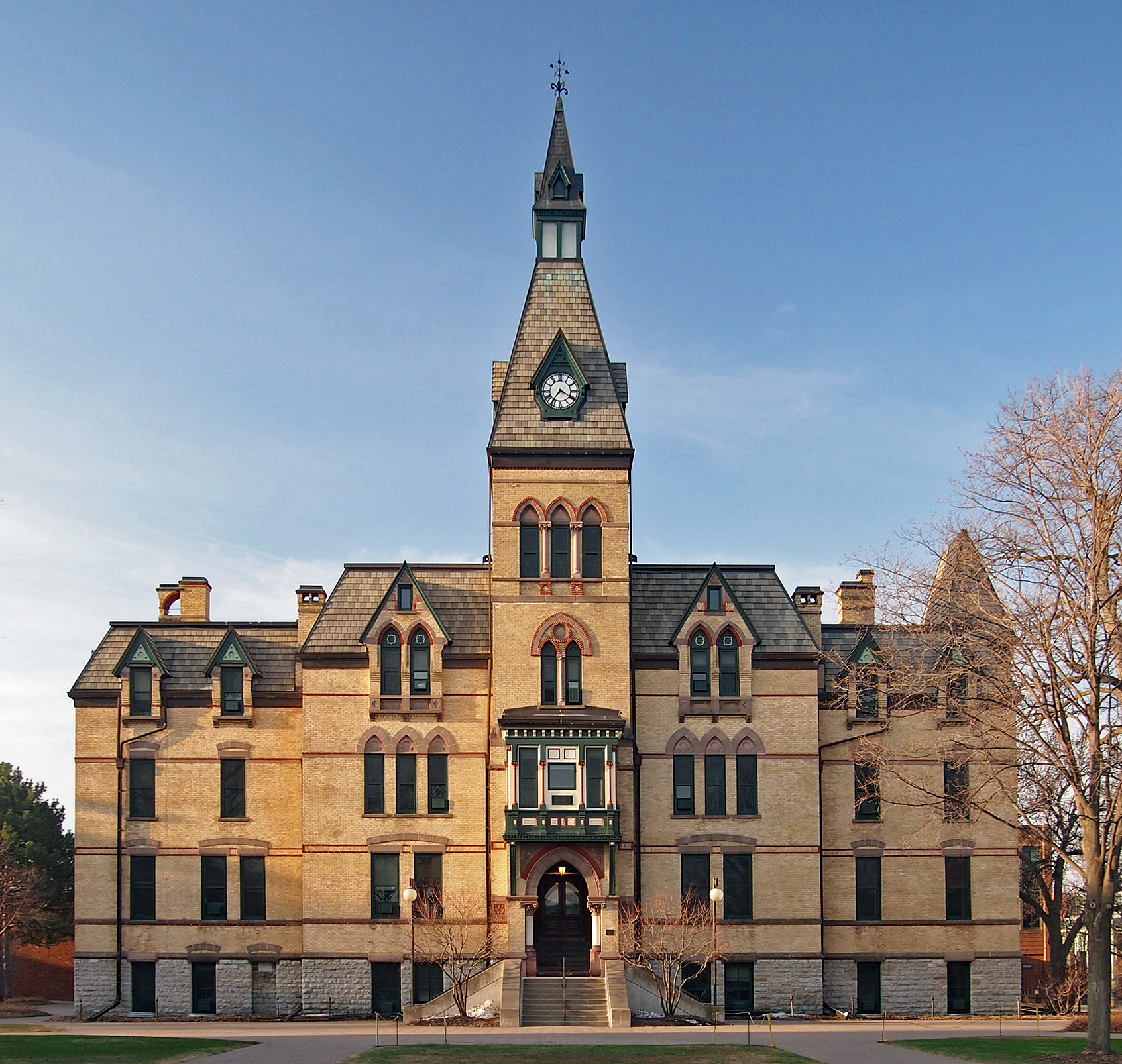
Hamline University's Old Main

Hamline University (1854) Hamline was founded and named after Methodist Bishop Leonidas Lent Hamline, who provided US$25,000 of his own money to launch the school. The university opened in Red Wing, Minnesota, with the premise that the school would eventually move to Saint Paul. A statue of the bishop, sculpted by the late professor of art Michael Price, stands on campus. In 1869, the university shut down its operations after enrollment dropped drastically due to the Civil War. The first building at the Red Wing site was torn down in 1872. A new building opened in 1880 in Saint Paul's Midway neighborhood housing 113 students. The building burned in 1883, and the following year, a new building was developed: Old Main, Hamline's oldest remaining building.

In 1917 Hamline actively responded to the call of World War I by incorporating an Army Training Corps at the university. More buildings developed after World War II. By 1928, Hamline consisted of Old Main (classrooms and administration), Manor House (women's residence hall), a Methodist church, and Goheen Hall (men's residence hall). Hamline faced tough challenges during the U.S. economic depression of the early 1930s. After World War II, Hamline's choir and theater department became a musical reference in Minnesota. The choir would eventually become nationally renowned, and would travel overseas. By 1950, enrollment surpassed 1000 students, and the board of directors decided on further development. New developments included two new residential halls (Sorin and Drew halls), a cultural center (Bush Student Center), a new carpentry center (VanHemert Hall) a new arts center, and a new science center (Drew Hall of Science). All of these projects were completed in the mid-1960s.

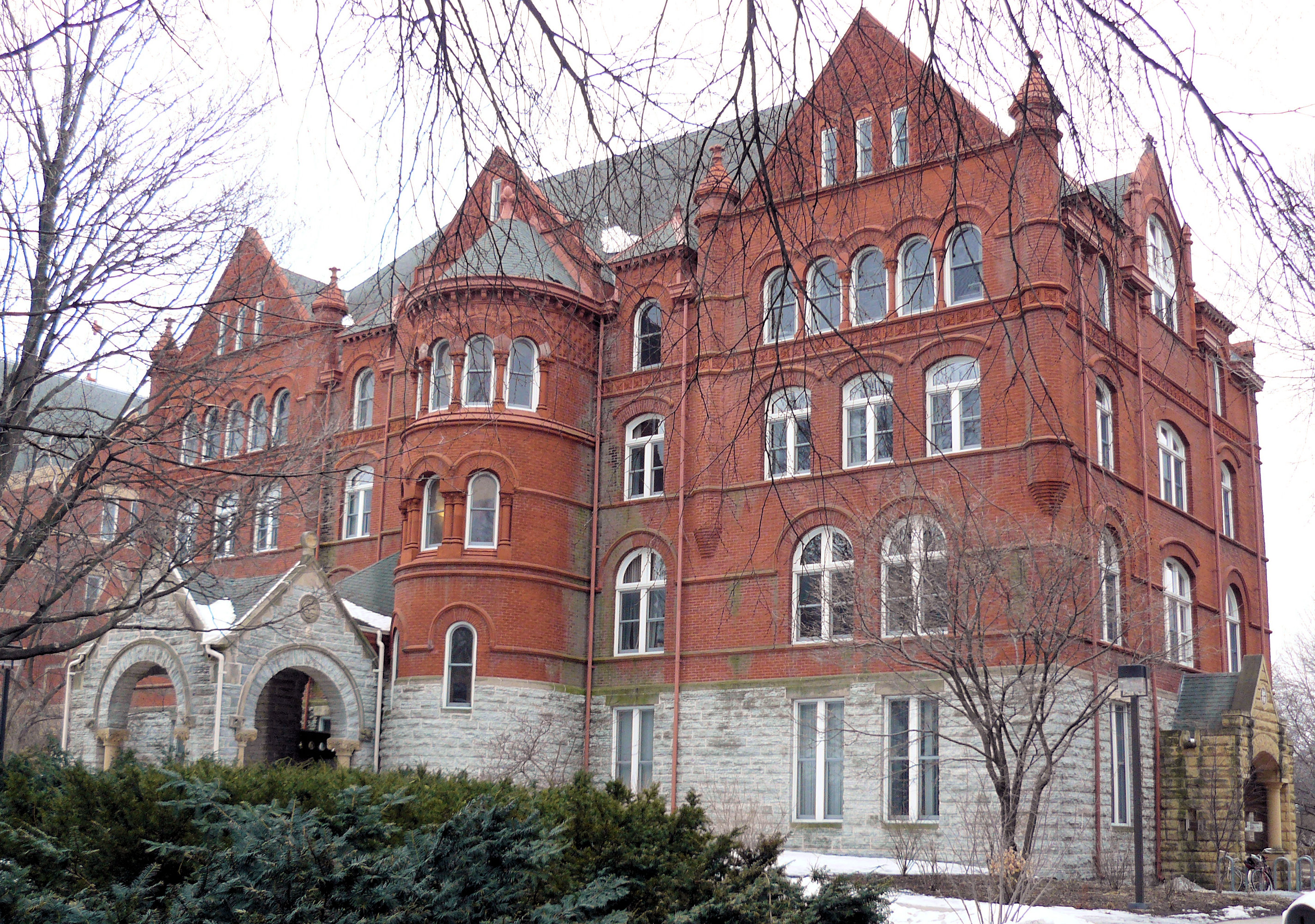
Macalester's Old Main

Macalester College (1885) had its beginnings due to the efforts of the Reverend Dr. Edward Duffield Neill, who had founded two schools in Saint Paul and nearby Minneapolis which were named after M.W. Baldwin, a locomotive builder and friend of Neill's. With the intention of turning his Saint Paul Baldwin School into a college, Neill turned to Charles Macalester, a businessman from Philadelphia, for sponsorship. Macalester donated a building near Saint Anthony Falls, and the college was chartered in 1874. The college moved to its present location in 1885 after building an endowment and seeking the help of the Presbyterian Church. The college first admitted women in 1893, and despite being affiliated with a religious institution, remained open to students of other faiths.

Macalester was largely carried through financial hardship and brought to prominence by Dr. James Wallace, father of DeWitt Wallace. Wallace was acting president of the college from 1894 to 1900, president from 1900 to 1906, and professor until just before his death in 1939. After World War II, the college developed a reputation for internationalism under the presidency of Charles J. Turck (later the namesake of Turck Hall), who recruited overseas and created a more diverse student body. Macalester's positive reputation grew during the 1960s, when it consistently drew many National Merit Scholars, enough to come in at the country's top ten. During this time the college also benefitted greatly from DeWitt Wallace's success with Reader's Digest. Macalester continued to develop into the 1990s, building its endowment and adding new facilities and equipment.

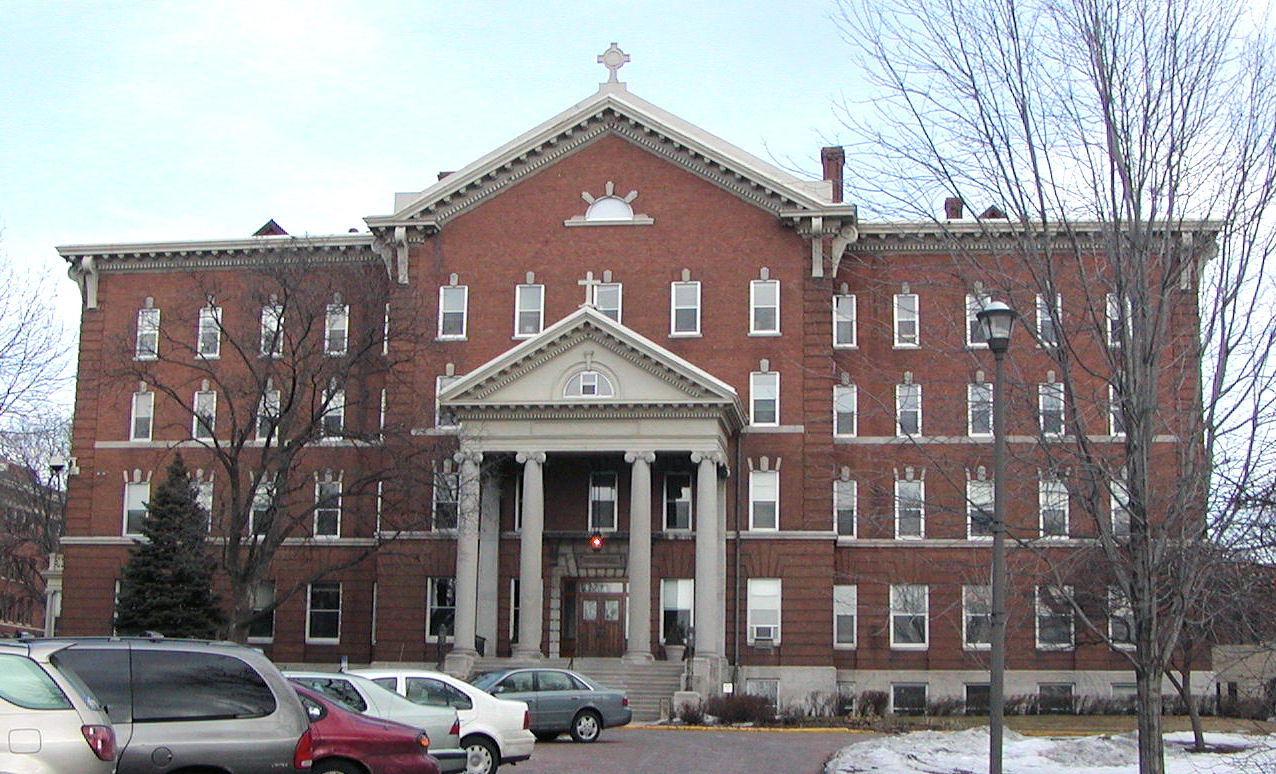
Derham Hall at Saint Catherine University

The University of St. Thomas (1885) began as an all-male, Catholic seminary. John Ireland, archbishop of Saint Paul and Minneapolis started the Saint Thomas Aquinas seminary, which became a liberal arts college in 1894. A gift from local railroad tycoon James J. Hill provided funds to establish the Saint Paul Seminary apart from the college. The College of Saint Thomas became a military-based school for undergraduates in 1906 and awarded its first academic degrees in 1910. Before that, the school gave out two-year diplomas in commercial and classical programs. In 1915, the college and Saint Thomas Military Academy for high school students split into two institutions and in 1965 the academy moved to Mendota Heights, Minnesota. The college later dropped its military distinction in 1922.

From the late 1920s through the mid-1930s, the Holy Cross Fathers, who run the University of Notre Dame, controlled the college's administration. The diocese called those priests in to help with the school's financial problems; they were known as a crisis intervention team of sorts for parochial schools of that time. During World War II, St. Thomas served as a training base for naval officers, which kept the school open when men who would have attended college were fighting in the war. After the war, in 1948, the college established 'Tom Town' on the eastern end of the lower quadrant, which is currently home to the O'Shaughnessey-Frey Library. Tom Town consisted of white, barrack-like housing units for faculty, students and their families. The units helped to meet housing demand after WWII.

Concordia University (1893) was founded by the Lutheran Church–Missouri Synod. It is part of the 10-member Concordia University System. It was founded to provide a Christian learning environment to high school students planning to go into professional ministries with the Lutheran Church–Missouri Synod. Current enrollment is about 5,500 students who learn in St. Paul, Portland, Ore. and online.

The first predecessor of William Mitchell College of Law (1900) was founded by five prominent St. Paulites (Hiram F. Stevens, Ambrose Tighe, Moses Clapp, Thomas D. O'Brien, and Clarence Halbert). St. Paulites Warren E. Burger and John B. Sanborn, Jr. received their law degrees from William Mitchell, while fellow native Harry Blackmun taught at the school prior to his judicial service.

The Saint Paul campus of the St. Catherine University (1905) was founded by the Sisters of Saint Joseph of Carondelet. It was named for Saint Catherine of Alexandria.

Luther Seminary (1917) (ELCA) was initially formed through the merger of three institutions in 1917 in conjunction with the merger of three Norwegian Lutheran Churches to create what was later named the Evangelical Lutheran Church. The ELC became part of the ALC in 1960.

== Religion ==
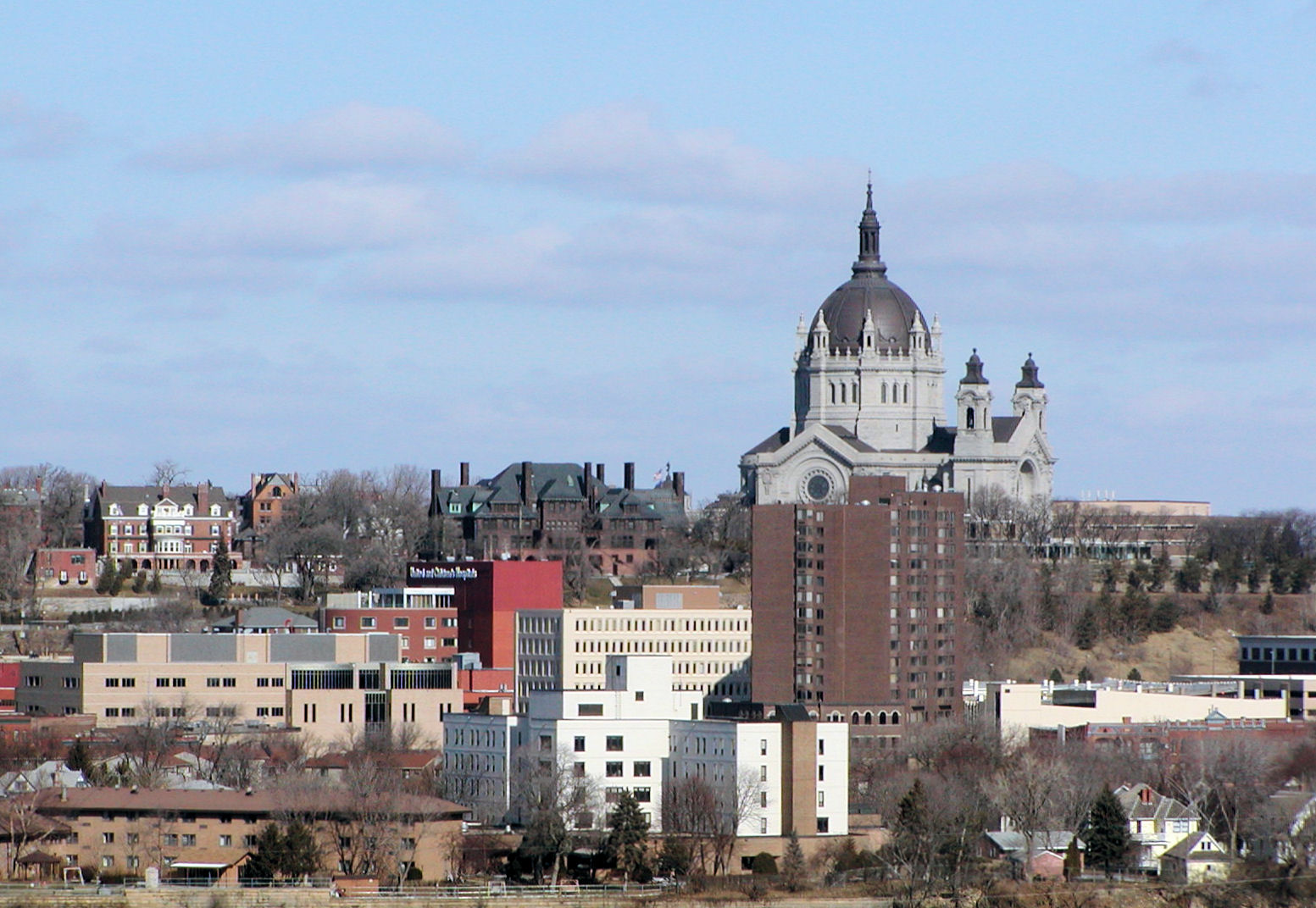
Cathedral of Saint Paul, the highest structure in the city

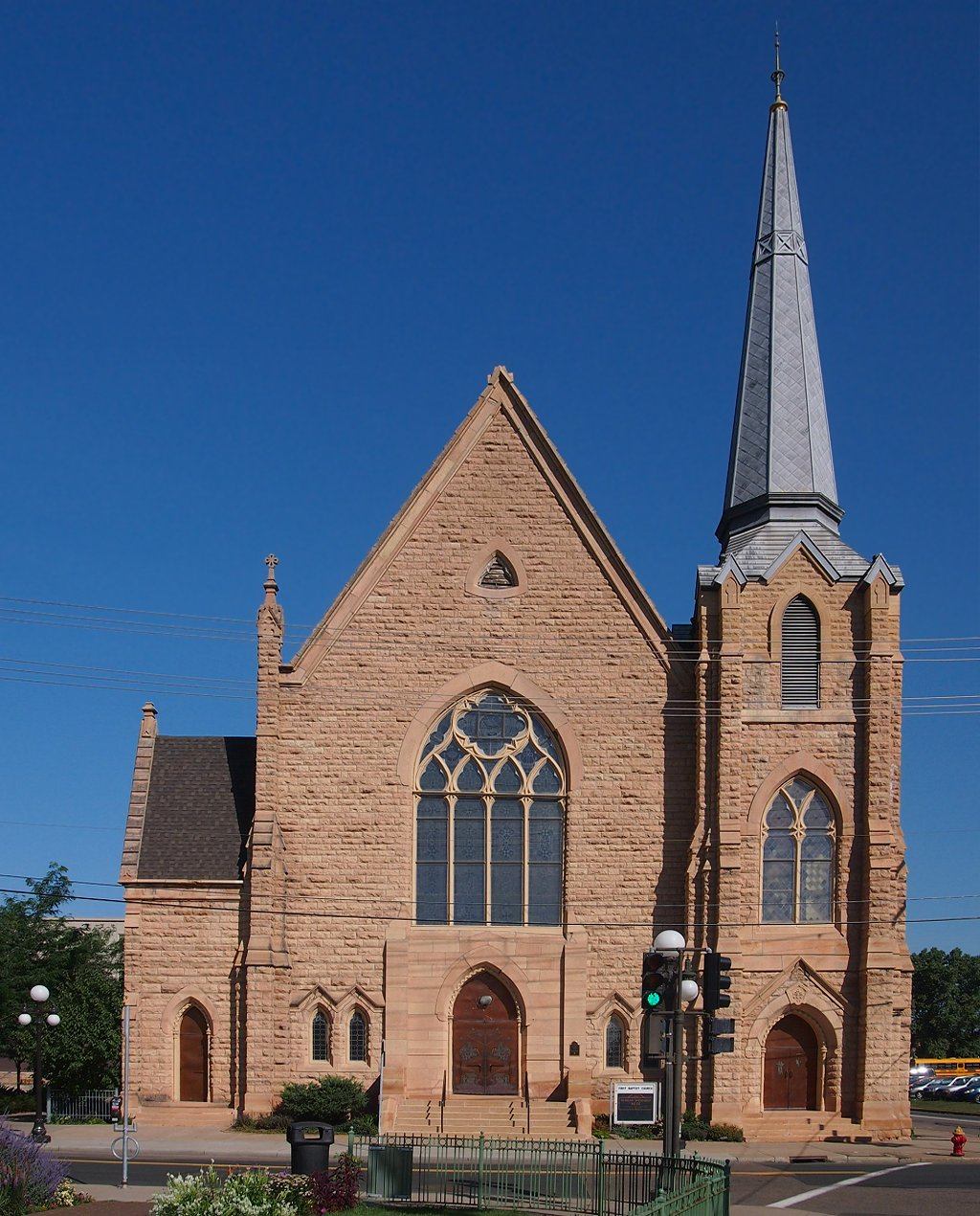
First Baptist Church

As the population of the city grew churches for Christian worship were erected. Most prominently on the city's skyline is the Cathedral of Saint Paul; its construction was instigated by Archbishop John Ireland in 1904. At Ireland's direction, the archdiocese commissioned well-known French Beaux-Arts architect Emmanuel Louis Masqueray, who was also the chief architect of the 1904 World's Fair in St. Louis, Missouri, and construction began in 1906. Masqueray's open design allows visitors unobstructed views of the altar and pulpit. The German, French, and Polish Catholics had earlier calved from the more prominent Irish parish forming the Church of the Assumption, the Church of Saint Louis King of France (French: L'Eglise de Saint-Louis, Roi de France, which is known commonly today as "the little French church") and was the third Catholic Church built by French Canadians to serve the large French speaking population in the rivertown of Saint Paul at the time and finally the Church of Saint Casimir (and Saint Adalbert's Church), respectively. The German-Catholic Parish at the Church of the Assumption spun off several additional German Parishes: Sacred Heart (1881), Saint Francis de Sales (1884), Saint Matthew (1886), the Saint Agnes (1887), and Saint Bernard (1890). Our Lady of Guadalupe Church formed in the early 1930s to serve the Spanish-speaking immigrants on the West Side of Saint Paul.

Not to be eclipsed by the Catholic factions, the Protestants organized and built the first Central Presbyterian Church building in 1854, which was later enlarged during the 1870s. The rapidly growing congregation outgrew the building, so they built a new church in 1889. The building, an example of Richardsonian Romanesque architecture, is listed on the National Register of Historic Places. The First Baptist Church of Saint Paul built their building in 1875, and it was the largest and most costly church in Saint Paul, described in the Pioneer Press as "the finest piece of architecture west of Chicago." In 1909 Arlington Hill Lutheran Church was opened on Saint Paul's East Side, ministering in English, rather than the typical Swedish of that time in that neighborhood.

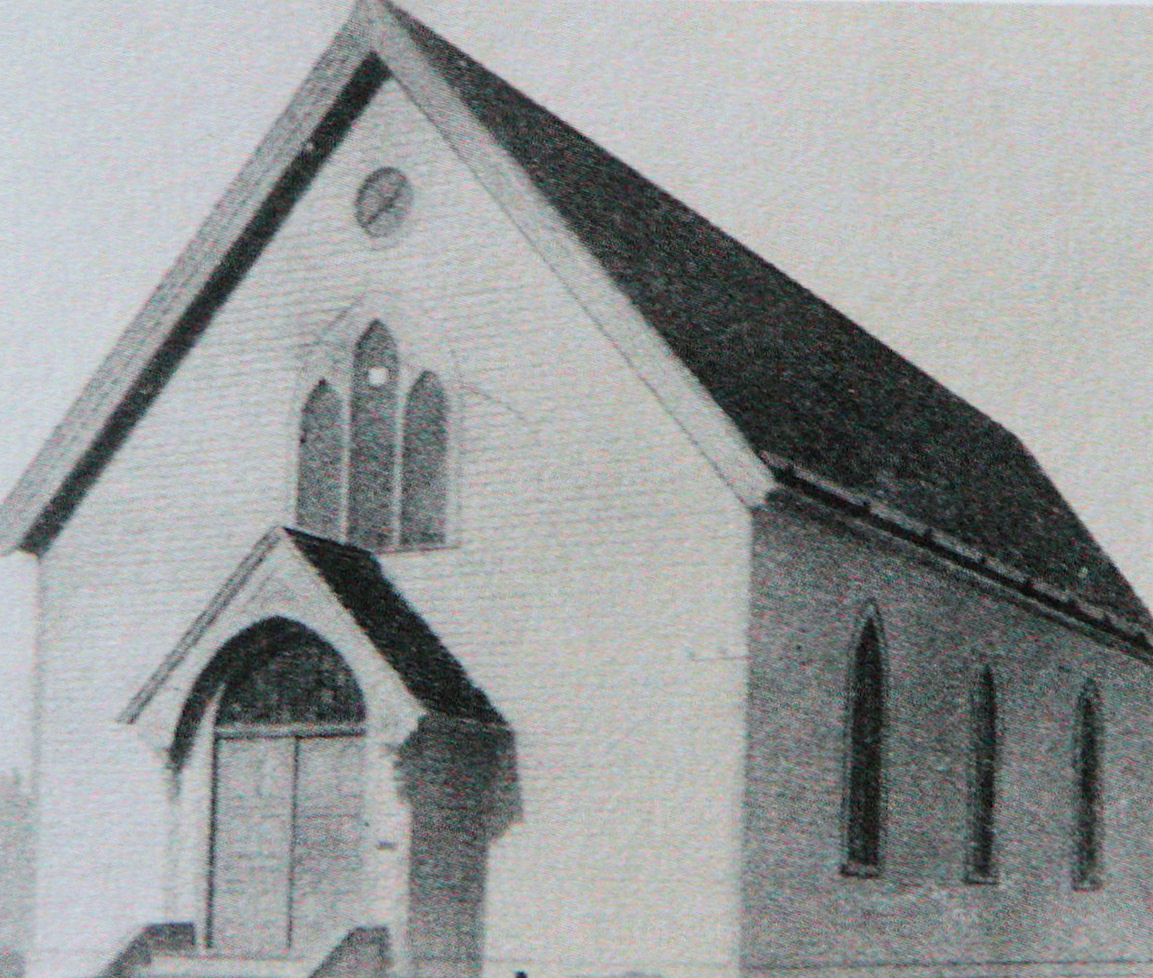
Mount Zion Temple

The First Lutheran Church was first organized in 1854, on Saint Paul's East Side. Services were held in Swedish until the 1890s when English was adopted. Lutheran Church of the Redeemer was founded in 1889 by Germans, but services were in English. On West 7th Street, the Saint Mark Lutheran Church switched from German to English in 1911. Organized in 1890, the Swedish Evangelical Lutheran Church of Merriam Park switched to English services in 1931. The Pilgrim Baptist Church is the building that houses the first Black Baptist congregation in Saint Paul. The congregation was founded on November 15, 1866, by Reverend Robert Hickman and a group of escaped slaves from Boone County, Missouri. They were smuggled up the Mississippi River on the steamer War Eagle with the help of Union Soldiers and the Underground Railroad. By 1900 this group had created four additional black churches in the city.

Judaism was prominent in Saint Paul from its earliest times; in 1856, eight German-Jewish merchants founded Mount Zion Temple. They were accepted in the community, both because they were Germans and because they were among the first residents of the frontier town. By 1900 the Jewish population in the city reached 5,000, but many of the more recent immigrants were from Russia and Poland and they sometimes clashed with the more established German Jews. Today, seven synagogues dot Saint Paul.

== West Side ==
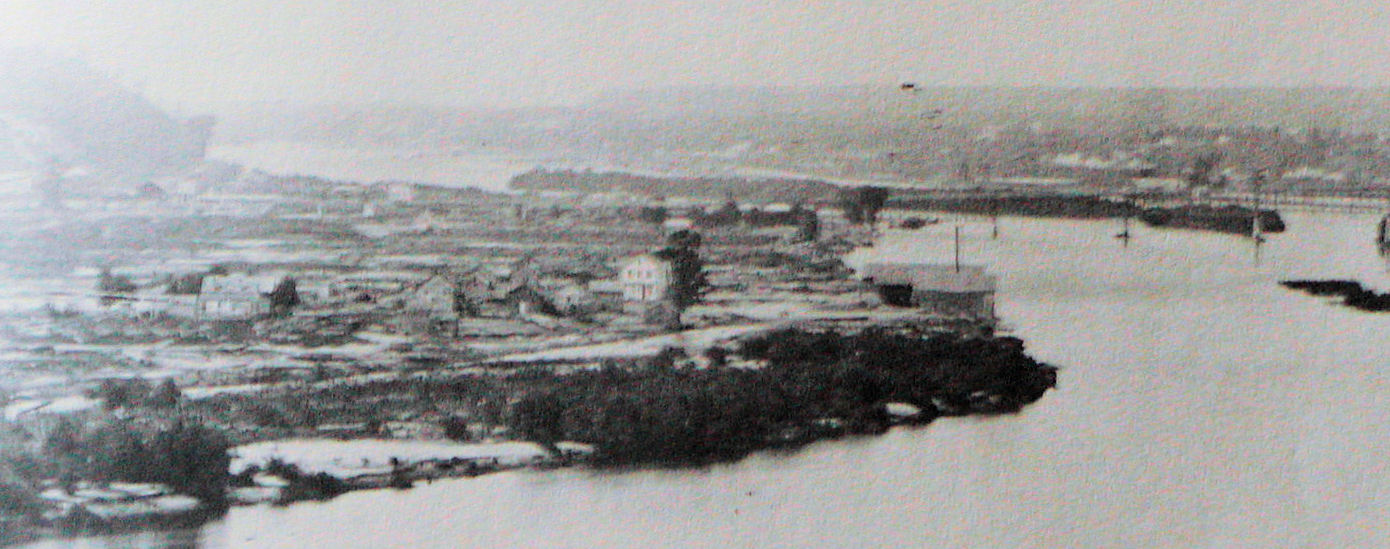
Lower West Side in 1869

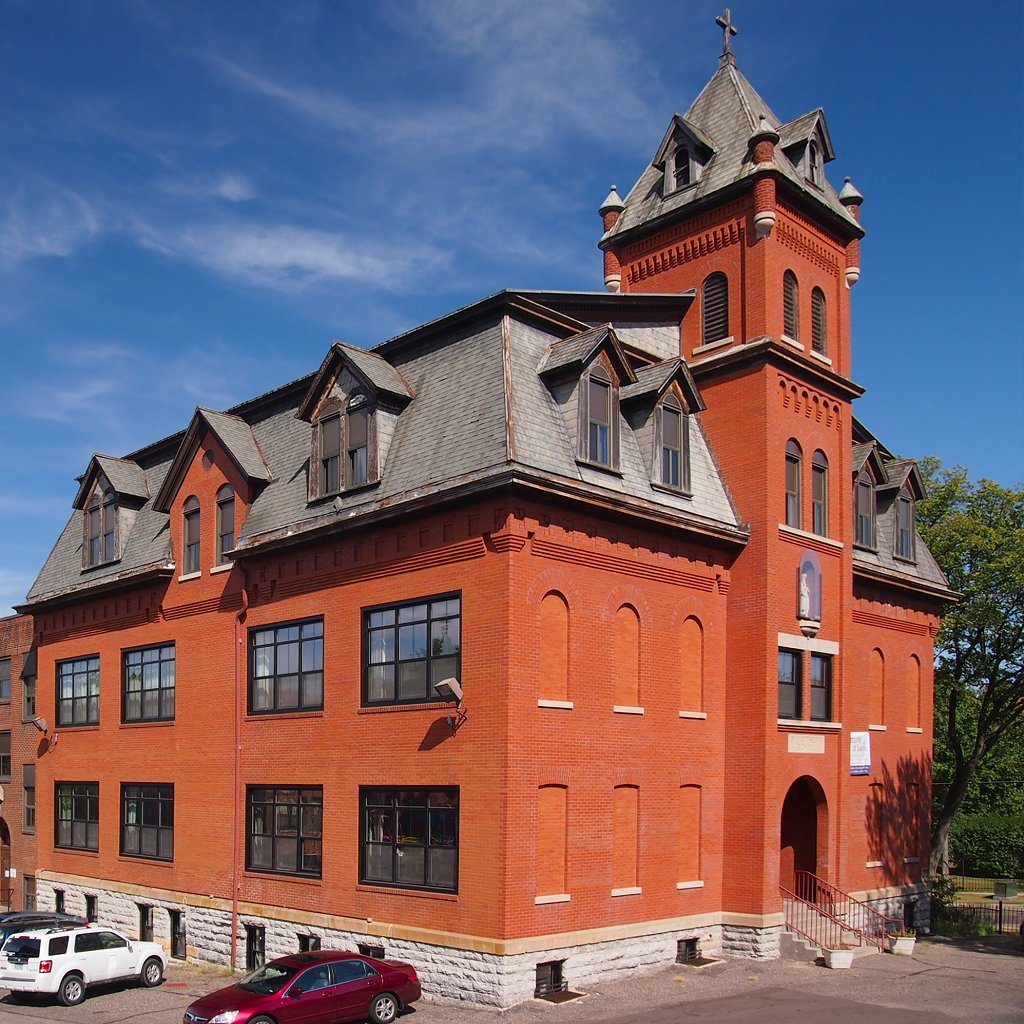
Saint Matthew's School on the West Side

Thus named because it is the area within the city limits that is on the west side of the Mississippi River, the West Side neighborhood is essentially south of downtown. Until the Treaty of Traverse des Sioux, the West Side belonged to the Dakota people, and hence unavailable for settlement. After the 1851 treaty, it was available, but due to frequent flooding, prior to 1880, few people lived on the "flats". French-Canadians, Irish, and especially Germans lived on the banks and bluffs out of the flood zone; in 1874, the West Side was annexed by the city of Saint Paul. In 1882 a trainload of 200 Eastern European Jews arrived, having fled genocide in their homelands. Having no money, they initially set up tents on the lowlands on the West Side, Saint Paul. The tents gradually gave way to small houses and over the subsequent three decades, more refugees joined them, coming from Russia, Lithuania, Poland, Syria, and Lebanon. Synagogues and a Hebrew school were built. The neighborhood was bound by geography, with the river forming the west, north, and east boundaries and the bluffs demarking the southern one. Elevation divided the area economically and ethnically. After World War I, the flats began to be populated by Mexican-Americans who came to Minnesota to work in meat packing plants and the sugar beet fields, some of whom settled there permanently. The Neighborhood House, a community support resource for social services was founded by the eastern European Jews, and became a haven for the Mexican immigrants in the 1920s and 1930s. The organization provided services such as English, sewing, and cooking classes, and employment referrals. As the Jewish residents built wealth and moved to higher ground, they rented their modest houses on the lowlands to the Mexican immigrants. The African-American architect, Clarence W. Wigington (1883–1967) designed several structures in the city, including the Harriet Island Pavilion. Little is left of the historical lowlands, as in the early 1960s, the entire neighborhood was bulldozed for urban renewal, destroying most of the historic structures on the lower West Side; but many of the homes of the wealthier residents on the high bluffs survive, including the Heimbach House and the Anthony Yoerg House.

== 1904 tornado ==
On August 20, 1904, Saint Paul and much of the Twin Cities area was struck by damaging thunderstorms and tornadoes. In Saint Paul, hundreds of buildings were damaged or destroyed causing USD $1.78 million in damages in the city. The A section of the 180-foot (55 m) High Bridge over the Mississippi River was blown down, and parts of it landed in homes on the flats under the bridge. Three people were killed and more than 50 injured in the downtown area, most of whom were at the Tivoli Concert Hall and the (Vaudeville) Empire Theater near the Wabasha Street Bridge. The German-American Bank building and Pioneer Press building both sustained heavy damage, with each losing most of their upper floor windows. Electrical lines were lost, cutting off communication to the city and complicating the relief efforts.

Before it was torn from its mountings, the U.S. Weather Bureau anemometer atop the Pioneer Press building's roof in Saint Paul recorded a one-minute sustained wind speed measurement of 110 miles per hour (177 km/h) with a gust to 180 miles per hour (290 km/h). Each of those are Minnesota records that still stand today. Even though the measured wind gust could have been strong enough to classify as an F3 tornado, it is unknown whether the damage was caused by a tornado or a straight line winds because a condensation funnel was never observed.

== Twentieth century ==
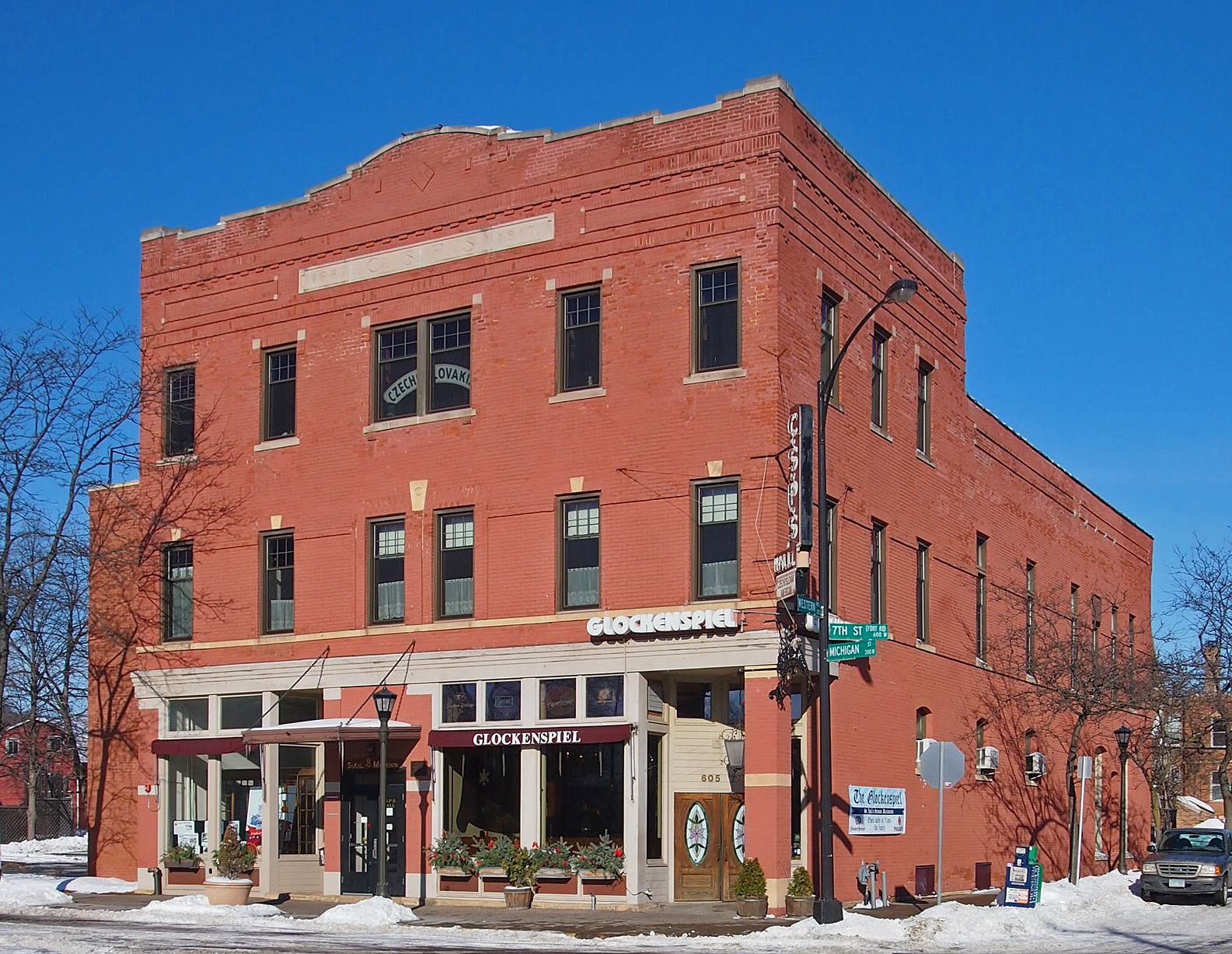
C.S.P.S. Hall

The French, German, Irish, and Swedish immigrants were replaced by Czech, Slovak, Italian, and Polish immigrants. In 1879 the Czech Slovak immigrant community that was based at the intersection of St. Clair and West Seventh Streets purchased a lot at 383 Michigan from a sitting mayor of Saint Paul, William Dawson. They establish their first hall as a home to a number of their organizations, including a literary society Slovanska Lipa (1868–79), a fitness society Sokol (1882–present) and Česko-Slovanský Podporující Spolek (C.S.P.S.) or Czech-Slovak Protective Society as a fraternal benevolent/insurance group (C.S.P.S.) When the first hall burned, the second was built in 1887 with a third story added in 1917. St. Paul's C.S.P.S. Hall is the oldest Czech-Slovak Hall in the United States, as well as the oldest theater and national hall in the State of Minnesota. In 1977 it was declared a National and State Historic Site and placed on the National Register of Historic Sites as Building #77000763. The 1923 Payne Avenue State Bank served Scandinavian, German, Italian, and other European settlers who lived in the East Side neighborhood. World War I brought a violent wave of anti-German sentiment to the city. The Saint Paul Public Schools stopped teaching the German language (which had been standard fare), German Christians congregations experienced harassment from the Minnesota National Guard, the 18-foot (5 m) statue of "Germania" was removed from the Germania Life Insurance Company building, sauerkraut was temporarily renamed "Liberty Cabbage", and hamburgers were dubbed Salisbury Steak.

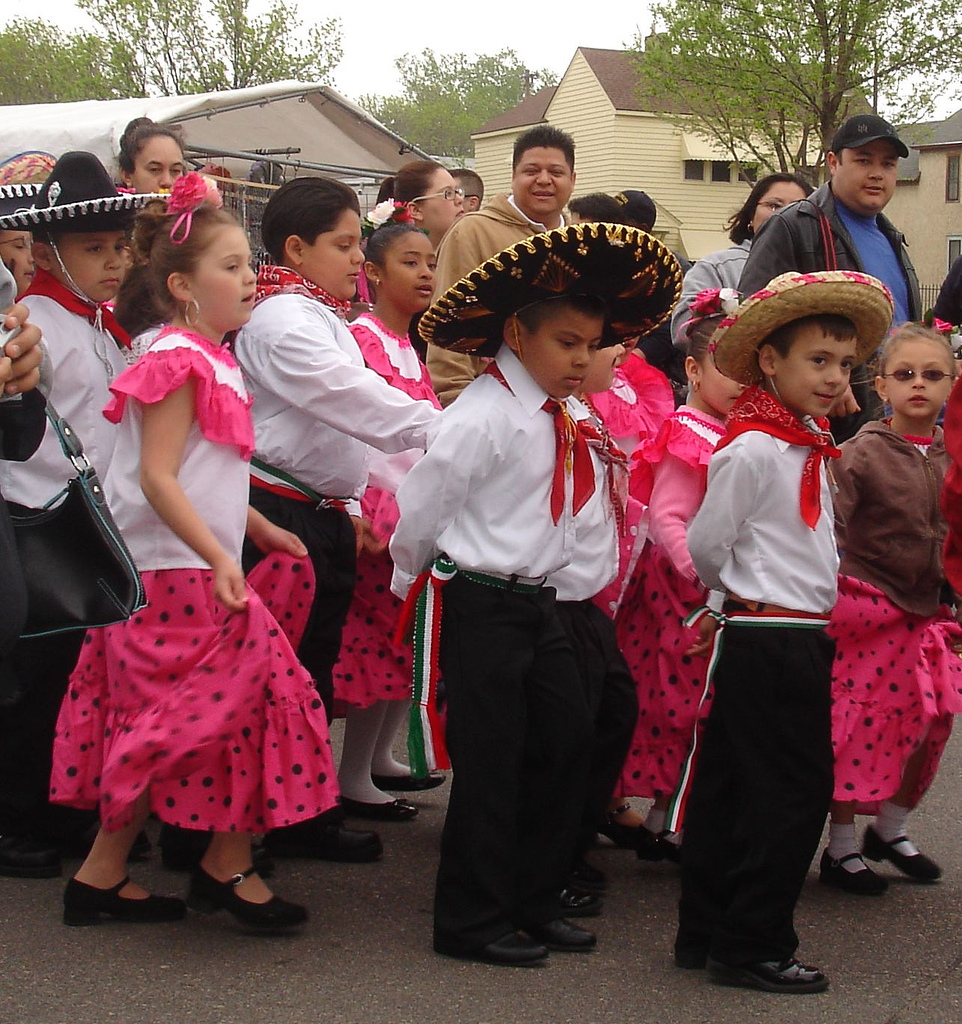
2007 Cinco de Mayo parade

World War II brought labor shortages and new opportunities for African Americans in the city. The Twin City Ordnance Plant in nearby New Brighton employed as many as 20% of the black adults in the area. After the war the G.I. Bill provided unprecedented education and professional training to blacks in the city. Tragically, the Rondo neighborhood, once the heart of the African American middle class in the city, was destroyed when the neighborhood was razed to make way for Interstate 94. According to Roy Wilkins, Rondo Avenue had been one of the city's best locations, with tree-lined streets and abundant music, emanating from Victrolas, saxophones, and player pianos. Like more than 100 other U.S. cities, Saint Paul endured rioting in 1968 after the assassination of Martin Luther King Jr. The unrest stemmed out of despair and protests against the Vietnam War. The outcome was state legislation and private sector programs designed to combat racism.

== Twenty-first century ==
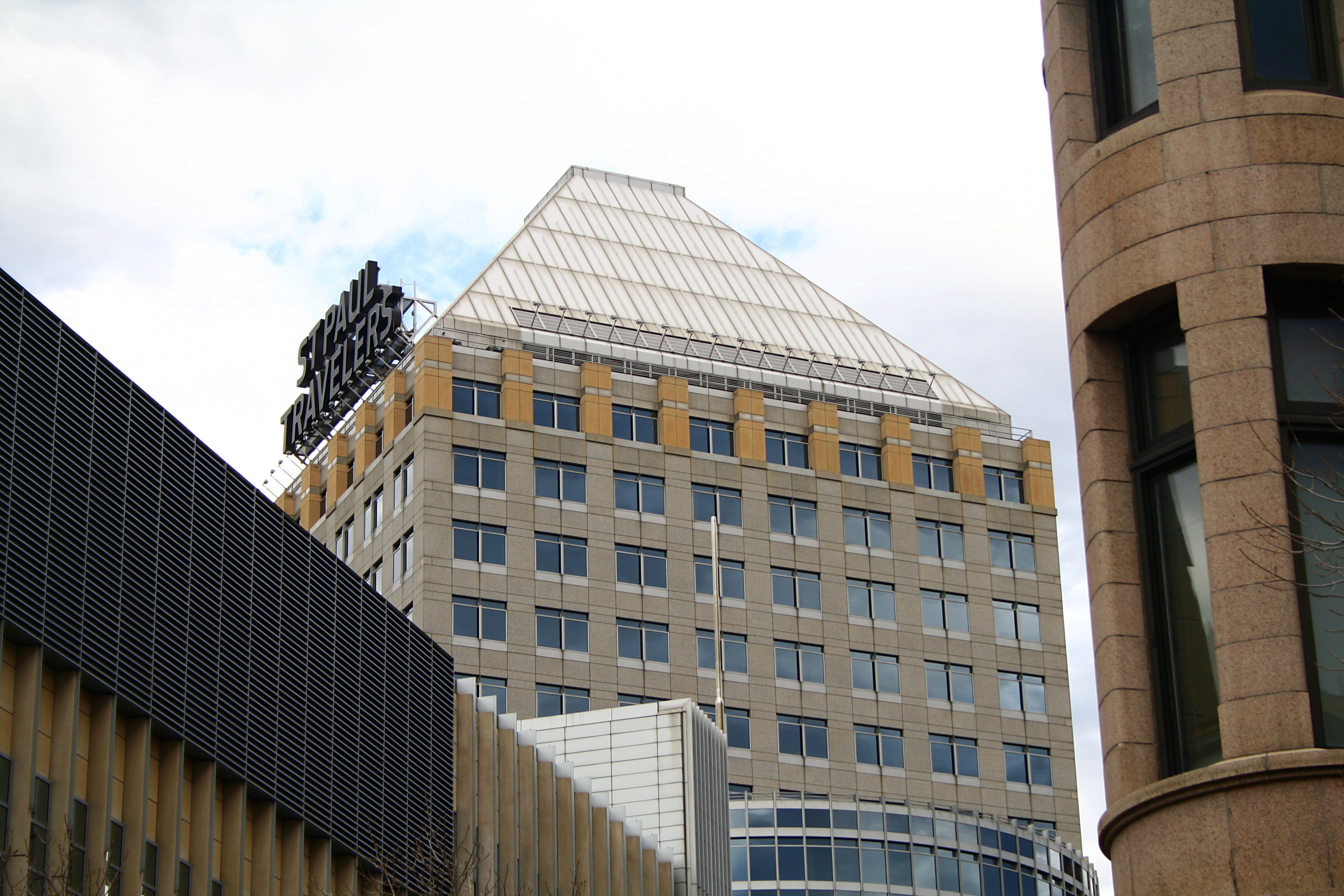
Ecolab Company headquarters

The West Side continues to be home to third and fourth-generation Mexican immigrants, as well as 21st-century first-generation Mexican immigrants. The Neighborhood House continues to serve the needs on the residents of the lower West Side. Since the lock and dam system on the Upper Mississippi River was completed in the 1950s, flooding on the West Side flats has become a rarity, and quality housing for low- and middle-income families has been built there. Much of the activity is now geared toward preserving Mexican traditions, with programs to celebrate music, ballet, and history of the Mexican immigrants in Saint Paul. The West Side bustles each year to celebrate Cinco de Mayo, El Grito, and Día de la Independencia.

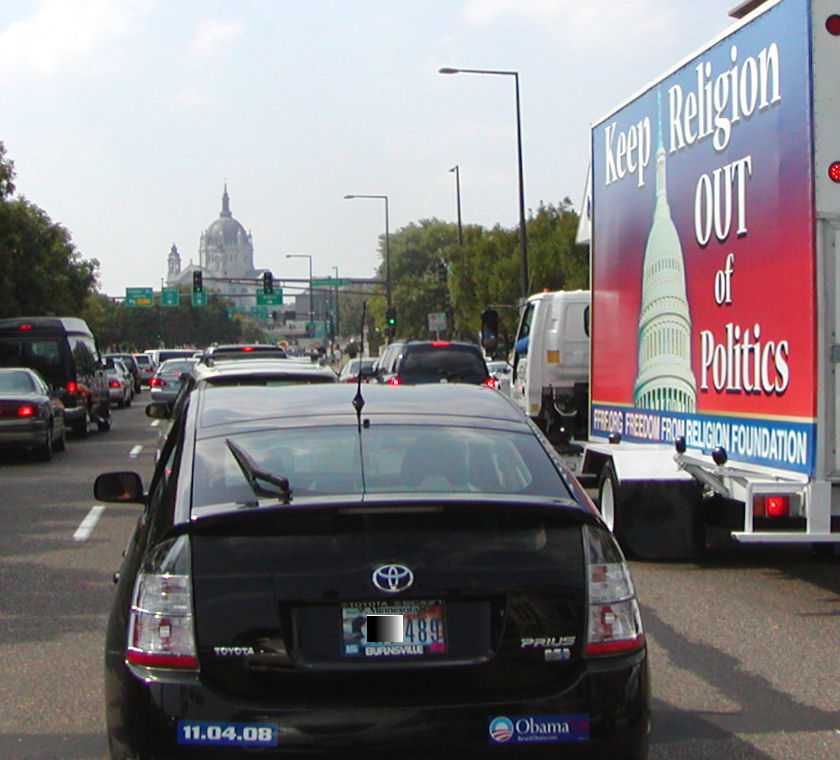
Saint Paul was chosen to host the 2008 Republican National Convention, which attracted protesters, traffic, and mobile advertisers to the city.

As of 2004, nearly 10% of the city's population were recent Hmong immigrants from Vietnam, Laos, Thailand, and Myanmar. America's involvement in the war in Vietnam created millions of refugees from Southeast Asia. Many had aided the opposition forces; others were displaced as regimes changed. With extraordinary encouragement from Walter Mondale, Saint Paul and Minneapolis received large numbers of these new immigrants between 1976 and the present, as they found their way to Minnesota. As with each ethnic group in Saint Paul's history, the newest immigrants speak their native languages, live in somewhat segregated communities, and start out with few monetary assets.

The city continues to be a financial center with the headquarters for The Travelers Companies. Many of the large buildings in Lowertown, such as the Commerce Building and the Finch, Vanslyck, and McConville Dry Goods Company Building are residential condominiums and apartments.

Saint Paul's Xcel Center was chosen to host the Republican National Convention in 2008. For the first week in September, the city was flush with delegates, protestors, lobbyists, and law enforcement agents.

== See also ==
- History of Minnesota
- History of Minneapolis
- National Register of Historic Places listings in Ramsey County, Minnesota
