= Harriet Island =

Former island and urban park in Minnesota

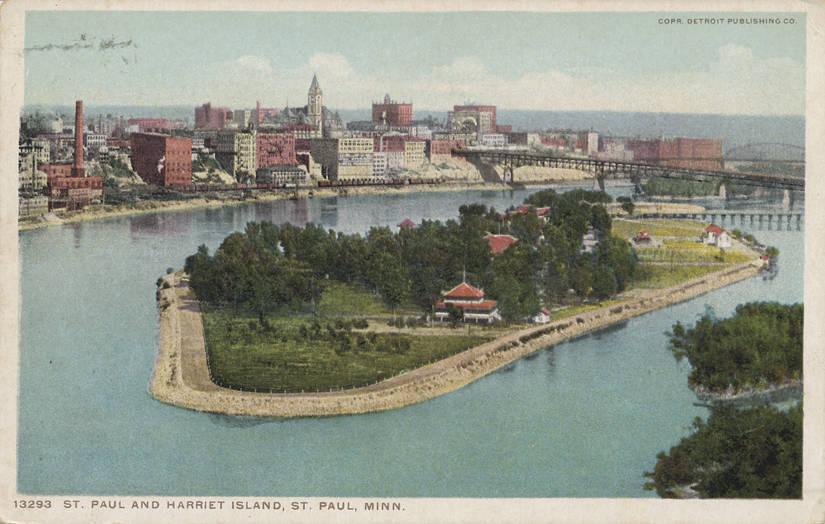
- Map of Harriet Island and Saint Paul c. 1900

Geography
- Coordinates: 44°56′15″N 93°05′48″W
- Area: 705 sq ft (65.5 m^{2})

Additional information
- Time zone: Central Time

Harriet Island, initially known as Wakan Island, is a former island and urban park located near downtown Saint Paul, Minnesota, United States. It was named after Harriet Bishop, an American educator who helped found the First Baptist Church of Saint Paul.

In 1900, the island was sold to Saint Paul to be converted into a park. Initially successful as a tourist attraction, over the years, the island fell into disuse. In 1950, the channel separating Harriet Island from the mainland was filled, merging the island with the mainland.

== History ==
Harriet Island was initially an enlarged sandbar located in the Mississippi River, but was later populated by trees. In 1900, Justus Ohage, a German doctor who had acquired the island, sold it to the city of Saint Paul for use as a park. At first the park was successful, drawing in tourists, but by the 1920s, sewage from the Mississippi River had caused tourism to die down. Before he died in 1935, Ohage threatened to take back the island, but this did not occur. In 1950, the neglected island's back channel filled up, merging Harriet Island with the mainland. In 1969, a proposal to expand the island was rejected due to the Mississippi River still suffering from pollution. As the river's water quality improved, the island has had renewed interest.

== Geography ==
The climate of Harriet Island is hemiboreal. The temperature varies yearly, peaking at 24 °C (75 °F) in July and dropping to −10 °C (14 °F) in January. Additionally, the island gets around 1,022 mm (40.2 in) of rainfall yearly.

== Tourism ==
The Harriet Island Pavilion is located in the island, also being named after Harriet Bishop. The park also features walking and biking trails, and paddleboats. The park also hosts two festivals, the well attended Minnesota Yacht Club Music Festival in the middle of July, which started in 2024 and continues annually, and the Minnesota Country Club Festival which is also in the middle of July, and debuted in 2026.
