= Church of the Assumption (Saint Paul, Minnesota) =

Historic church in Minnesota, United States

- Church of the Assumption--Catholic
- U.S. National Register of Historic Places
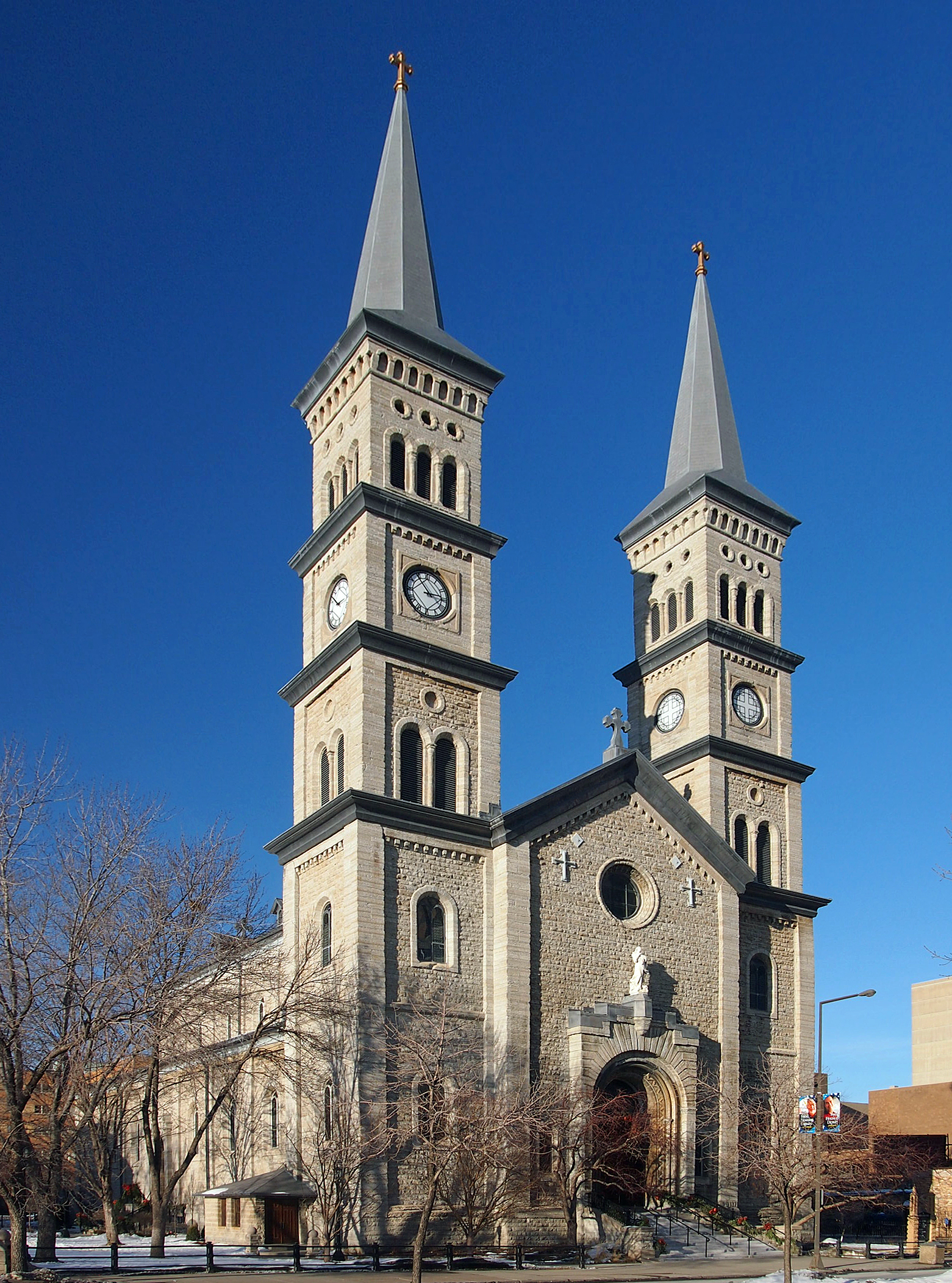
- The Church of the Assumption from the southwest

- Location within Minnesota Location within the United States
- Location: 51 9th Street West; Saint Paul, Minnesota
- Coordinates: 44°56′51″N 93°5′57″W
- Built: 1869-1874
- Architect: Joseph Reidl (Reidel), Erd Schlick, and Bahnholzer
- Architectural style: Romanesque
- NRHP reference No.: 75001008
- Added to NRHP: February 10, 1975

The Church of the Assumption Catholic Church was dedicated in 1874 and is the oldest existing church in Saint Paul. It is located at 51 West Seventh Street, in downtown Saint Paul. The building is listed on the National Register of Historic Places.

The parish was founded in 1856 by Bishop Joseph Crétin. At that time, immigrants from Germany were arriving, and the single Catholic parish in St. Paul mainly served French and Irish settlers, with services in Latin and sermons in their own languages. The first building was a plain stone structure with a wooden steeple on West Ninth Street. The founding pastor was Father George Keller. After Fr. Keller was transferred to Faribault, Minnesota in 1858, staffing of the parish was met by priests and brothers from St. John's Abbey (Order of St. Benedict) in Collegeville, Minnesota.

By 1869 the parish had outgrown the small chapel and a new building was urgently needed. The church's construction was ordered by then-Archbishop John Ireland, who wanted the city's growing Catholic German immigrant population to have a parish of their own. It was built in a plain Romanesque style of Lake Superior limestone by German Catholics, and is said to have been modeled after the Ludwigskirche in Munich. The architect, Joseph Reidel, was a court architect for the Wittelsbach family in Bavaria, Germany. It was built, according to the plans of the Bavarian Joseph Reidel, by the Germans in 1869–1874 in a neo-Romanesque, stone-washed style of Lake Superior.

The interior design of the church has remained substantially unchanged since the late 19th century. The statue of the Blessed Virgin Mary in the high altar came from the first church. There are shrines to Thérèse of Lisieux and Maria-Hilf; altars for the Blessed Mother and Saint John the Baptist, Saint Joseph, and Saint Lawrence; tapestries of the Good Samaritan and the Sts. Peter and Clemens Society; and other works of art.

As the parish grew, five daughter churches were spun off: Sacred Heart, St. Francis de Sales, St. Matthew's, Church of St. Agnes and Church of St. Bernard.

== Staff ==
- Pastor: Father Paul Treacy
