= Harriet Bishop =

American educator, writer, suffragist and temperance activist

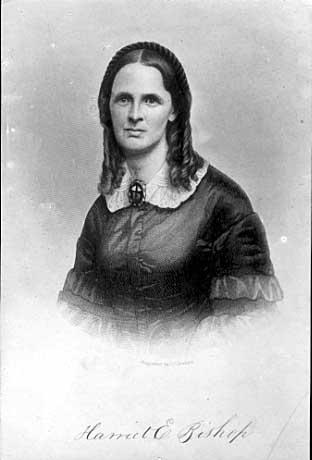
- Born: Harriet Bishop; January 1, 1817; Panton, Vermont, United States
- Died: August 8, 1883 (aged 66); Saint Paul, Minnesota, U.S.
- Resting place: Oakland Cemetery, Saint Paul, Minnesota
- Education: New York State Normal School
- Occupations: Teacher, writer, activist
- Spouse: John McConkey (divorced)
- Relatives: Eunice Gibbs Allyn
- Writing career
- Pen name: Harriet E. Bishop McConkey
- Genres: Naturalism, History
- Subject: Minnesota
- Notable works: Floral Home; Dakota War Whoop; Minnesota Then and Now

Harriet E. Bishop (January 1, 1817 – August 8, 1883) was an American educator, writer, suffragist, and temperance activist. Born in Panton, Vermont, she moved to Saint Paul, Minnesota in 1847. There, she started the first public school as well as the first Sunday school in Minnesota Territory. She was a founding member of temperance, suffrage and civic organizations, and played a central role in establishing the First Baptist Church of Saint Paul. An active promoter of her adopted state, she was the author of books such as Floral Home, or First Years of Minnesota (1857) and Dakota War Whoop, or Indian Massacres and War in Minnesota of 1862–63 (1863).

Harriet Island, now part of the Mississippi shoreline near downtown Saint Paul, was named after Bishop.

The first schoolhouse, which she opened in a former abandoned blacksmith shop with rats and snakes in the corners on July 19, 1847. covered with bark and chinked with mud" at what is now St. Peter Street and Kellogg Boulevard in the relatively isolated fur trading post of Saint Paul. Within less than a year, she organized the Saint Paul Circle of Industry to raise funds to build a new structure for the students. The new building also served as a church, meeting hall, courtroom, and polling place. Of the seven students in her first class, only two were caucasian. She had to rely on a student who was fluent in French, Dakota, and English to translate for her classes (which she taught in English). To further aid in the education of Minnesota children, Bishop established the Minnesota Women's Seminary in Saint Paul in 1850.

== Activism ==
Bishop was actively involved in many public concerns, most notably the temperance movement and women's suffrage. She helped organize the Sons of Temperance and encouraged her students to pledge to abstain from alcohol. In 1867 she helped found the Ladies Christian Union and spearhead the construction of the Home to the Friendless, which is now Wilder Residence East. In 1877, she became the first organizer of the Minnesota Women's Christian Temperance Union, working to help form chapters all over the state. Bishop is also recognized as one of the founders of the Minnesota Woman Suffrage Association.

== Personal life ==
While Bishop quickly established herself as a dynamic public force in the soon-to-be new state of Minnesota, there is little information about her private life. She was the third daughter of Putnam and Miranda Bishop of Panton, Vermont. She was engaged to marry a young Saint Paul lawyer who was younger than her, but the engagement was called off by the man's sister who believed the age difference between the two to be improper. In 1858 she married John McConkey, a widower with four children. This marriage lasted until 1867 when, having evidently been broken by experiences as a soldier in the First Minnesota Regiment in the Civil War, McConkey had become an alcoholic. She successfully sued for divorce and petitioned to have her maiden name restored.

In the early 1870s, Bishop was a defendant in a civil suit charging that she had made unauthorized land purchases on behalf of a New York land speculator. Shortly after this, in 1873, she went on a lecture circuit in California. She returned to Saint Paul in 1875 where she continued to work as a lecturer, writer and activist until her death on August 8, 1883.

== Partial list of works ==
- Floral Home; or, First Years of Minnesota, published in New York, 1857
- Dakota War Whoop, or Indian Massacres and War in Minnesota of 1862–63, published in 1863
- Minnesota Then and Now, published in 1869

== Legacy ==
Harriet Island, now part of the Harriet Island Regional Park in Saint Paul, was named after Harriet Bishop.

Bishop is the namesake of the Harriet Bishop, a riverboat operating out of Saint Paul. Harriet Bishop Elementary School in Rochester, Minnesota and in Savage, Minnesota are also named for her.
