= Payne Avenue State Bank =

- U.S. National Register of Historic Places
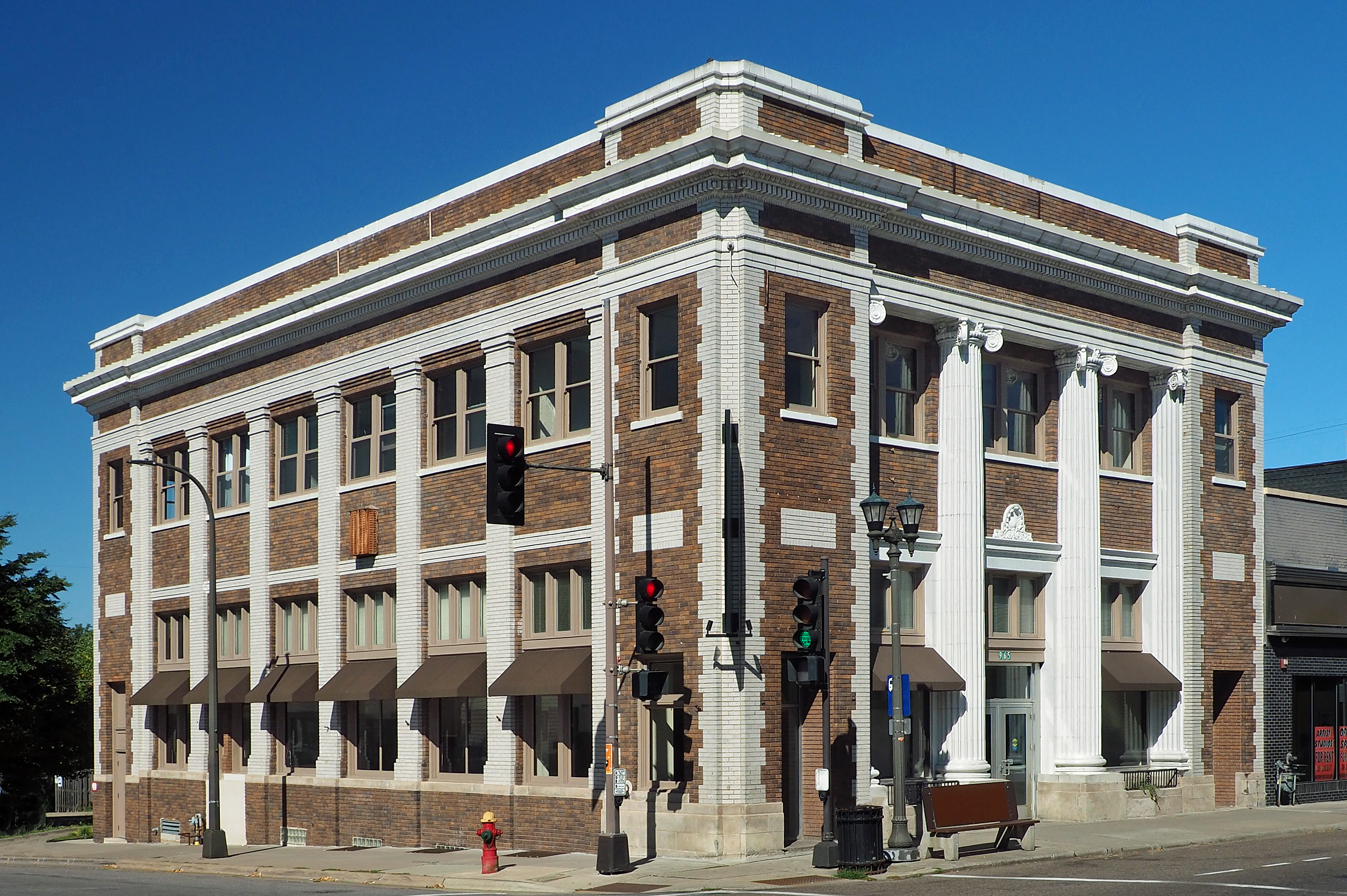
- Payne Avenue State Bank from the southeast

- Location within Minnesota Location within the United States
- Location: 965 Payne Avenue, Saint Paul, Minnesota
- Coordinates: 44°58′13.5″N 93°4′26″W
- Built: 1923
- Architect: W. L. Alban
- Architectural style: Beaux-Arts
- NRHP reference No.: 07000426
- Added to NRHP: May 15, 2007

The Payne Avenue State Bank was designed in the Beaux-Arts style by W. L. Alban in 1923. Located in a predominantly new immigrant area of Saint Paul, Minnesota, United States, the bank initially served Irish, Swedish, German, and Italian immigrants in Saint Paul's East Side neighborhood. The formidable brick building conveyed a sense of permanence to the area residents.
