= Edward and Elizabeth Heimbach House and Carriage House =

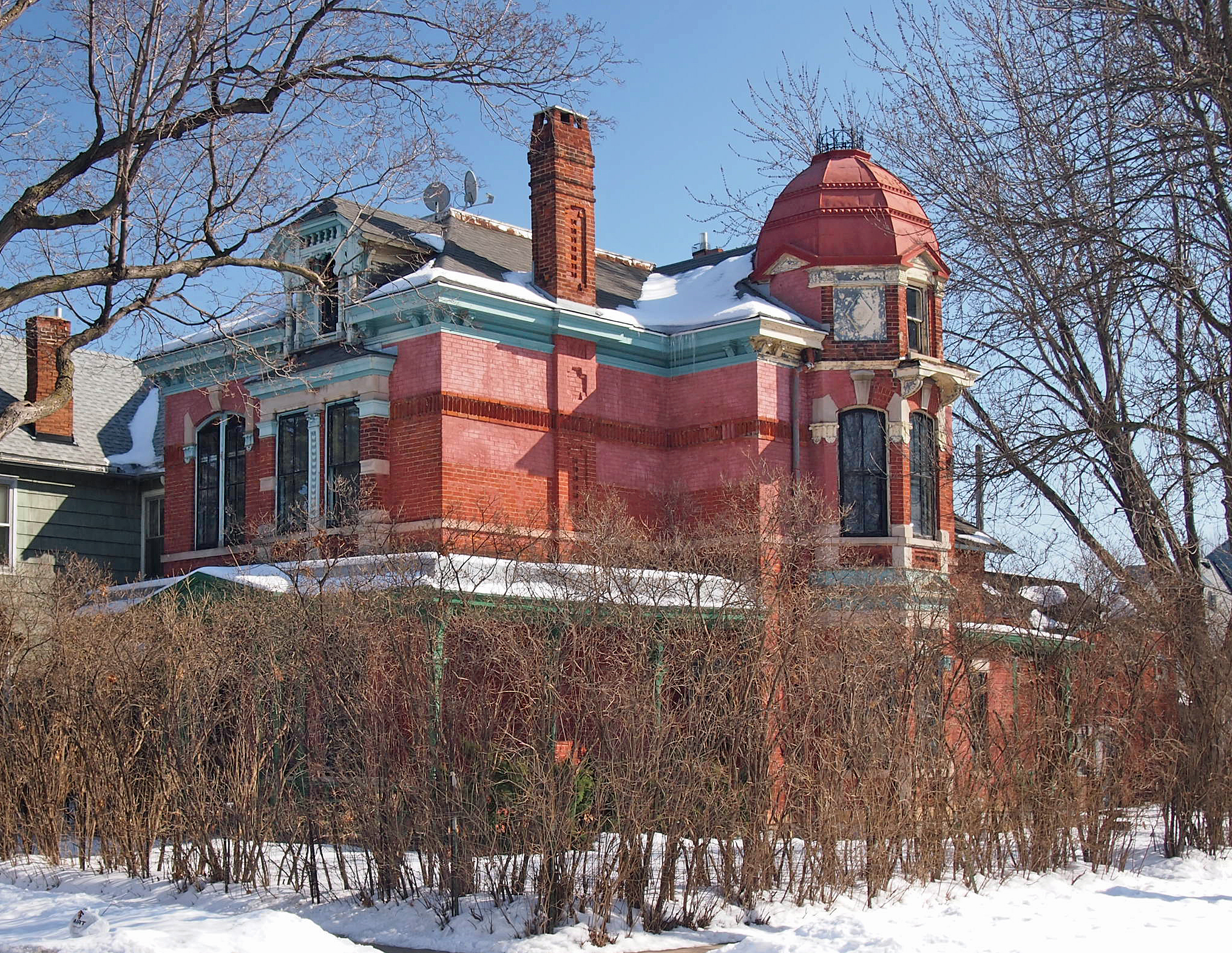
- The Heimbach House viewed from the northwest
- Interactive map of the Edward and Elizabeth Heimbach House and Carriage House area

General information
- Architectural style: Late Victorian
- Location: 64 Delos Street West, Saint Paul, Minnesota, United States
- Coordinates: 44°56′1.5″N 93°5′16.5″W
- Construction started: 1885
- Completed: 1890

The Edward and Elizabeth Heimbach House and Carriage House is an 1890, high Victorian style, two-story, 2,556-square-foot (237.5 m^{2}) brick house in Saint Paul, Minnesota, United States, in the West Side neighborhood. The house has an octagonal tower and dome and a detached carriage house.

The house was nominated to the National Register of Historic Places (NRHP) in 1983. The Heimbach House received reference number #83004628 and the listing code DR, meaning "Date Received" and nomination pending, but the listing was never finalized.
