= David Luckert House =

Historic house in Minnesota, United States

- George Luckert House
- U.S. National Register of Historic Places
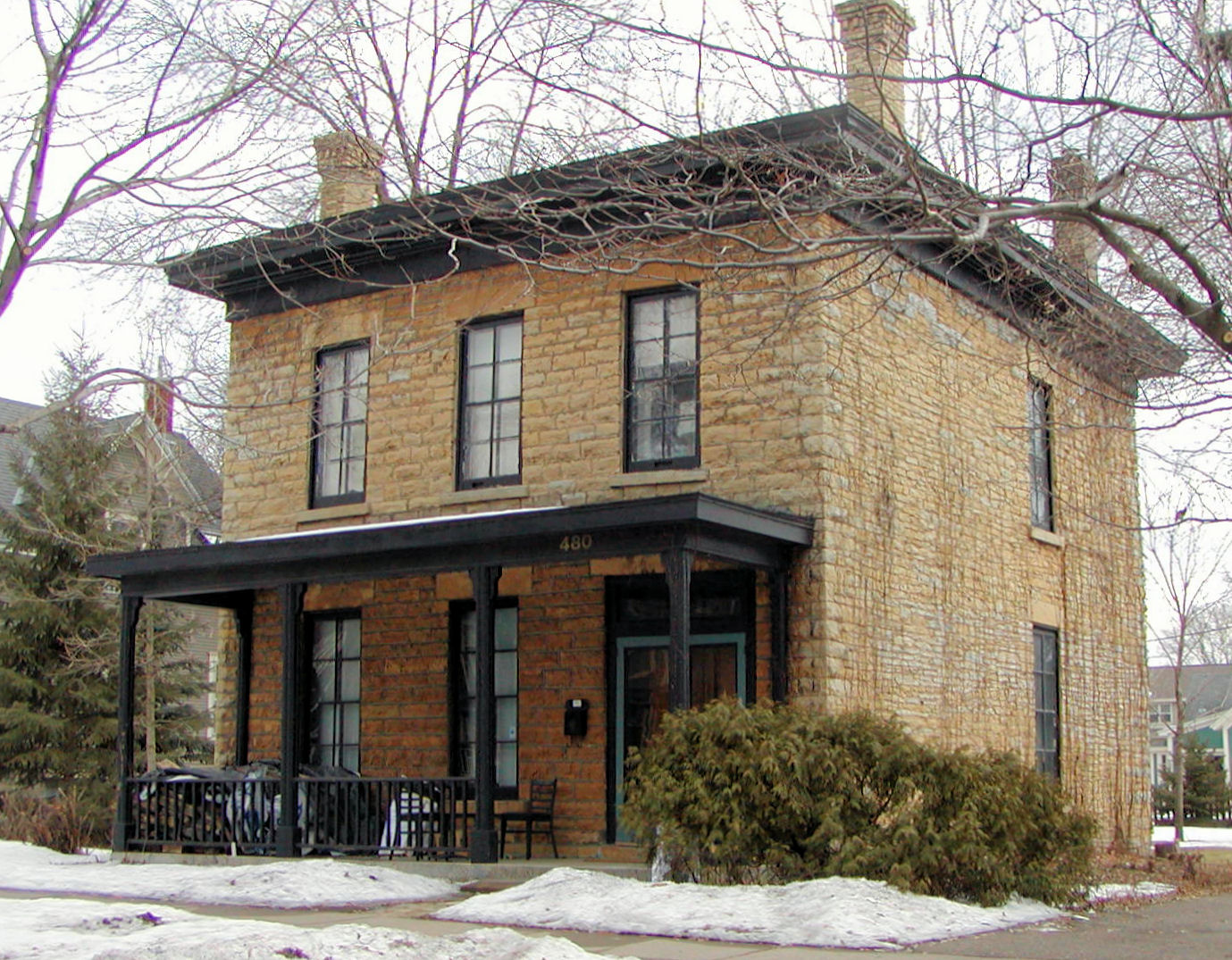

- Location within Minnesota Location within the United States
- Location: 480 Iglehart Street; Saint Paul, Minnesota
- Coordinates: 44°56′57.5″N 93°7′13″W
- Built: 1855
- Architect: George Luckert
- Architectural style: Federal italianate
- NRHP reference No.: 75001011
- Added to NRHP: May 12, 1975

The David Luckert House is an 1858 limestone house; one of the oldest homes in Saint Paul, Minnesota, United States. It is listed on the National Register of Historic Places. It is also known as the George Luckert House.

== History ==
The Luckert House is the oldest known residence in the Saint Anthony Hill area of Saint Paul. This area saw some of the first land development outside the limits of the city when Minnesota was a territory. It is the last known residence which originally existed along the route of the old Saint Anthony Road, an overland stagecouch route into St. Paul.

The 1880 census listed the original owner of the home as George D. Luckert of Wurtemberg, Germany, a stonemason who built the home in the late of 1850s out of locally quarried Platteville limestone. In 1926, a George Luckert lived at the address and operated a business installing and repairing warm air furnaces. The National Historic Register lists the name of the home as the David Luckert House.

The home is vernacular and representative of frontier residential construction. It has Italianate influences.
