= William Dahl House =

Historic house in Minnesota, United States

- Formerly listed on the U.S. National Register of Historic Places
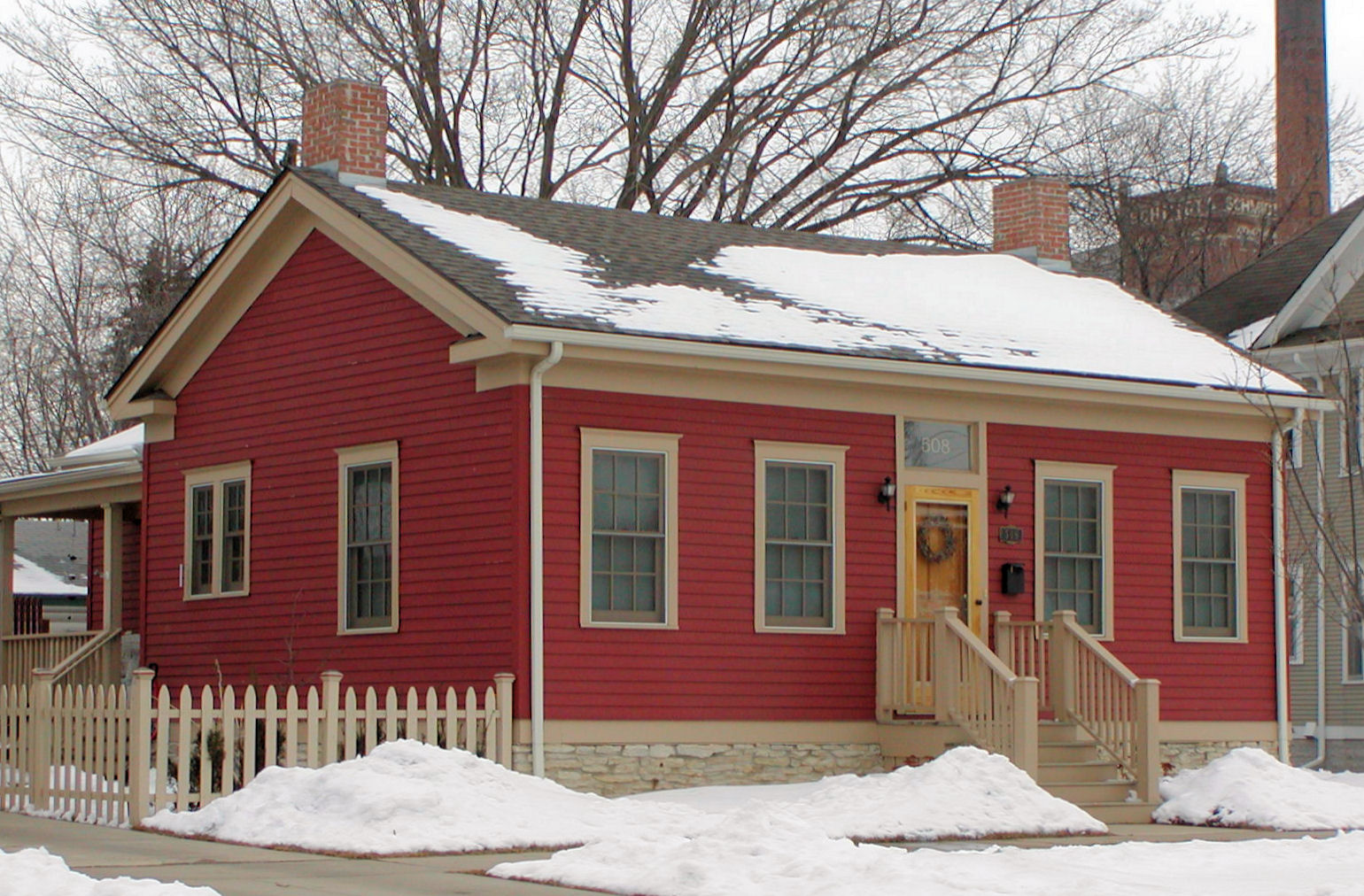

- Location within Minnesota Location within the United States
- Location: now located at 508 Jefferson Avenue originally located at 136 13th Street; Saint Paul, Minnesota
- Coordinates: 44°55′49.5″N 93°7′16.5″W
- Built: 1858
- Architect: Ireland & Donavan
- Architectural style: Greek Revival
- NRHP reference No.: 78001557
- Removed from NRHP: April 1, 1998

The William Dahl House was built by William Dahl and his Irish wife, Catherine Margaret Murphy in 1858. The home was moved from 136 13th Street in 1997. It is the last surviving house of the Lowerton residential district. The building was added to the National Register of Historic Places.

== History ==
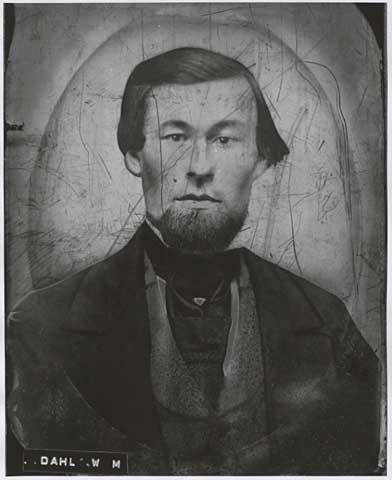
William Dahl, c. 1850

William Dahl emigrated from England to Minnesota in 1849. In 1857, Dahl purchased the land and completed his home in the summer of 1858. Built by Ireland and Donavan, the original cost was $300. The original house measured 20 ft (6.1 m) by 30 ft (9.1 m). A 19 ft (5.8 m) by 16 ft (4.9 m) kitchen was added in 1886, and a dining and recreation room was added in 1962.

Dahl died from tuberculosis in September 1858. His wife Catherine supported her three children by taking in laundry. She died in 1901 and her son Edward inherited the property.

Edward Dahl and his wife Sophia lived in the house until 1936. The property was sold to Roy Patterson. After Patterson's death, his widow sold the house to the state of Minnesota.

The house served as an office for the criminal system ombudsman.

=== Relocation ===
In 1997, the Minnesota Department of Revenue building was erected near the site of the historic home. In 2000, the house was relocated to its present-day location on 508 Jefferson Avenue.
