= Otto W. Rohland Building =

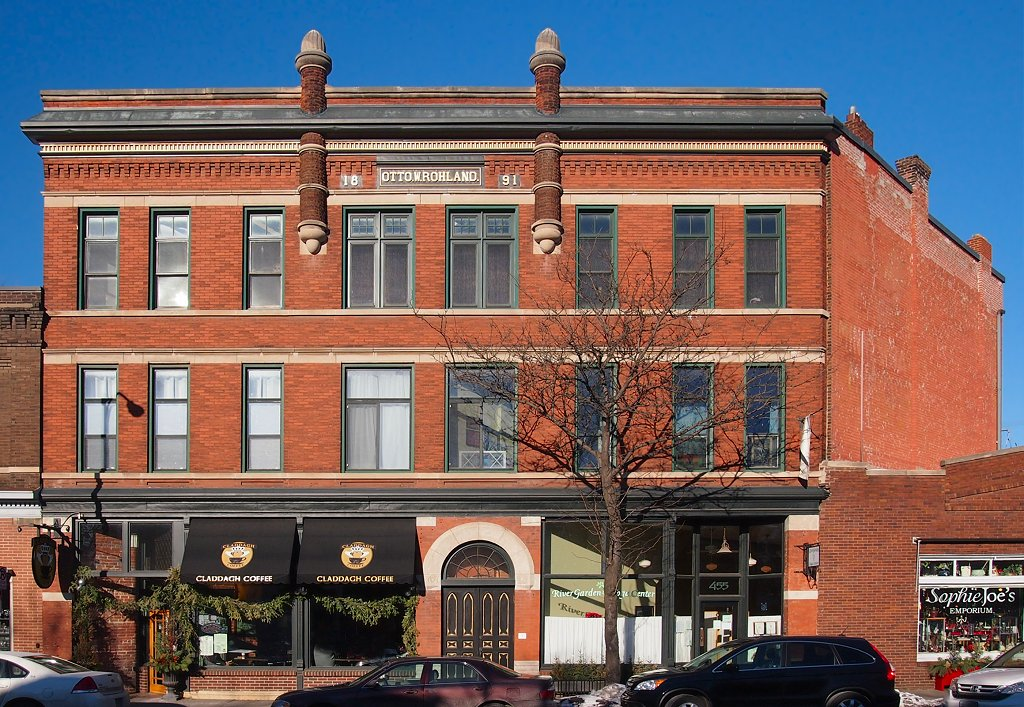
- Interactive map of the Otto W. Rohland Building area

General information
- Location: 455-459 Old Fort Road (West 7th Street), Saint Paul, Minnesota, United States
- Coordinates: 44°56′17″N 93°6′41″W
- Completed: 1891

The Otto W. Rohland Building is a historic building in Saint Paul, Minnesota, United States. Otto Rohland immigrated from Germany in 1867; this Victorian shop/residential building was built in 1891 and served as Rohland's grocery store and meat market into the 1950s; one source says the market was at 461 Old Fort Road.

The Rohland Building was nominated to National Register of Historic Places in 1983. It received reference number #83004865 and the listing code DR, meaning "Date Received" and nomination pending, but the listing was never finalized.
