= Church of St. Agnes (Saint Paul, Minnesota) =

Historic church in Saint Paul, Minnesota, United States

- Church of Saint Agnes--Catholic
- U.S. National Register of Historic Places
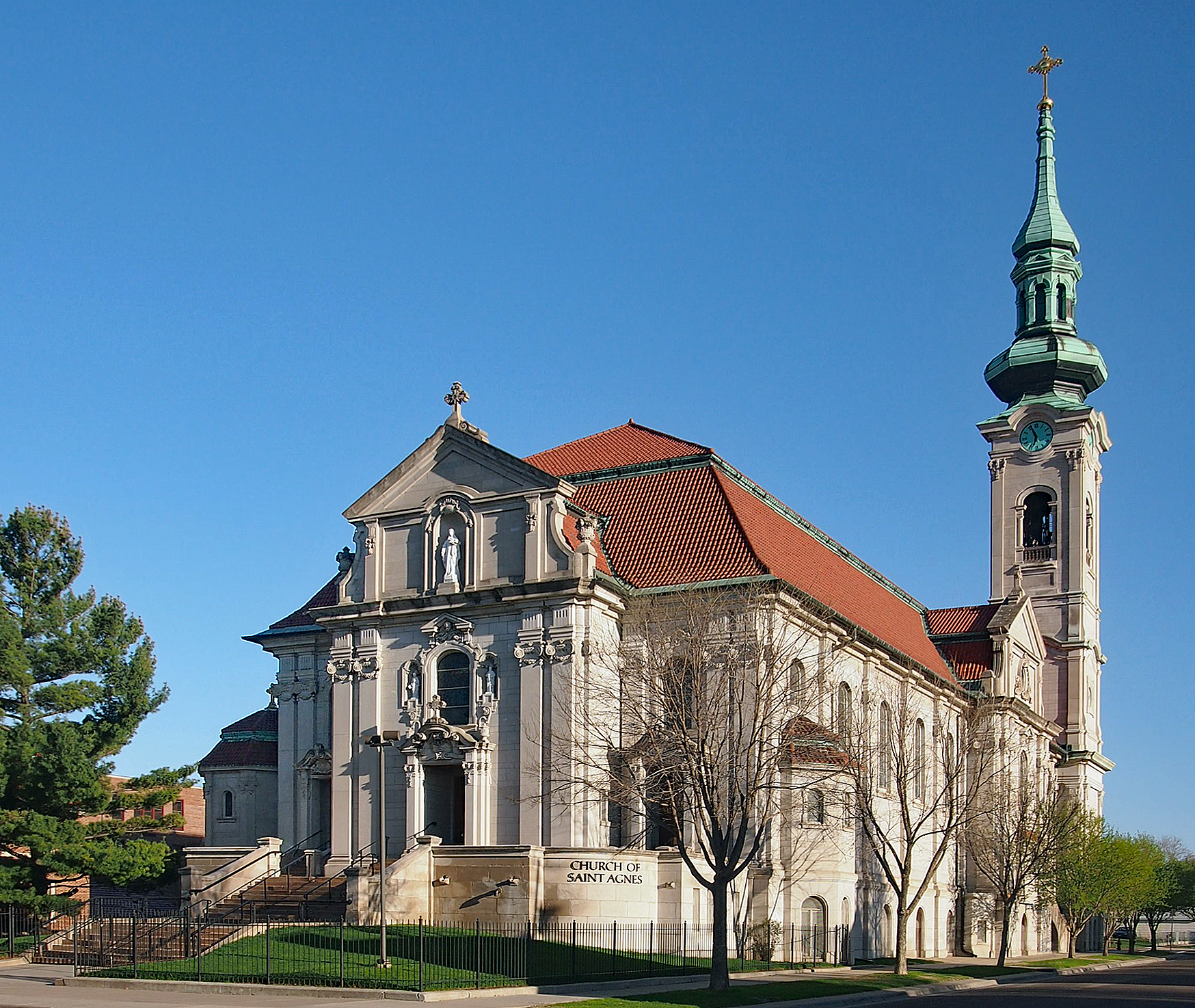
- The Church of Saint Agnes from the northwest

- Location within Minnesota Location within the United States
- Location: 535 Thomas Avenue West; Saint Paul, Minnesota
- Coordinates: 44°57′35″N 93°7′24″W
- Area: Less than 1 acre
- Built: 1901
- Architect: George J. Ries, John Fischer
- Architectural style: Baroque Revival
- Website: churchofsaintagnes.org
- NRHP reference No.: 80002125
- Added to NRHP: November 19, 1980

The Church of Saint Agnes is a Catholic church of the Archdiocese of Saint Paul and Minneapolis. The parish was founded in 1887 and the current church building was completed in 1912 and listed on the National Register of Historic Places in 1980.

== History ==
The parish was founded in 1887 by Archbishop John Ireland, who wanted to serve German-speaking immigrants who were settling in the Frogtown neighborhood of St. Paul to find work with the Great Northern Railway. The first brick-veneer building was designed by George Bergmann, a St. Paul architect who was also a parishioner and completed in 1888. However, a decade later, the congregation had outgrown the original building, and additional land was purchased for a new church complex.

The current building was begun in 1897 under the direction of James Trobec, who later became the third bishop of the Diocese of Saint Cloud. Two competing designs were submitted by architects Hermann Kretz and George Ries, and the design by Ries was selected. Ries modeled his design after Stift Schlägl, a Praemonstratensian monastery in Northern Austria near Aigen im Mühlkreis. The Baroque architecture style was familiar to immigrants who came from the Austro-Hungarian Empire and southern Germany. It is also influenced by Beaux-Arts ideals of balance and symmetry.

Construction began in 1897, when the basement was built. The basement was used for services while funds were raised to build the full structure. In 1909, after around $200,000 was raised, work on the structure resumed, to be completed in 1912. The onion-domed bell tower is 205 feet (62 m) tall, and placed at an unusual location at the back of the sanctuary. The front of the church has a monumental staircase leading to a terrace with three grand entrance doors. The central entrance door has an ornate window with niches on either side with statues of Saint Peter and Saint Paul. Above that, there is a pedimented gable with a statue of Saint Agnes, the patron saint of the church. The church and the tower are clad in Indiana limestone. Architecture critic Larry Millett calls the church, "The monument in Frogtown and one of St. Paul's finest churches."

The church was dedicated in 1912 in a four-hour-long service conducted by Archbishop John Ireland, accompanied by 32 priests. Brass chandeliers were salvaged from the former Minnesota State Capitol building which was located on Wabasha and Exchange Streets in downtown St. Paul. Stained glass windows were installed in 1930, along with a marble altar. The altar has a mosaic depicting the Crucifixion of Jesus with the Blessed Virgin Mary and Saint John.
