= First Baptist Church (Saint Paul, Minnesota) =

Historic church in Minnesota, United States

- First Baptist Church of St. Paul
- U.S. National Register of Historic Places
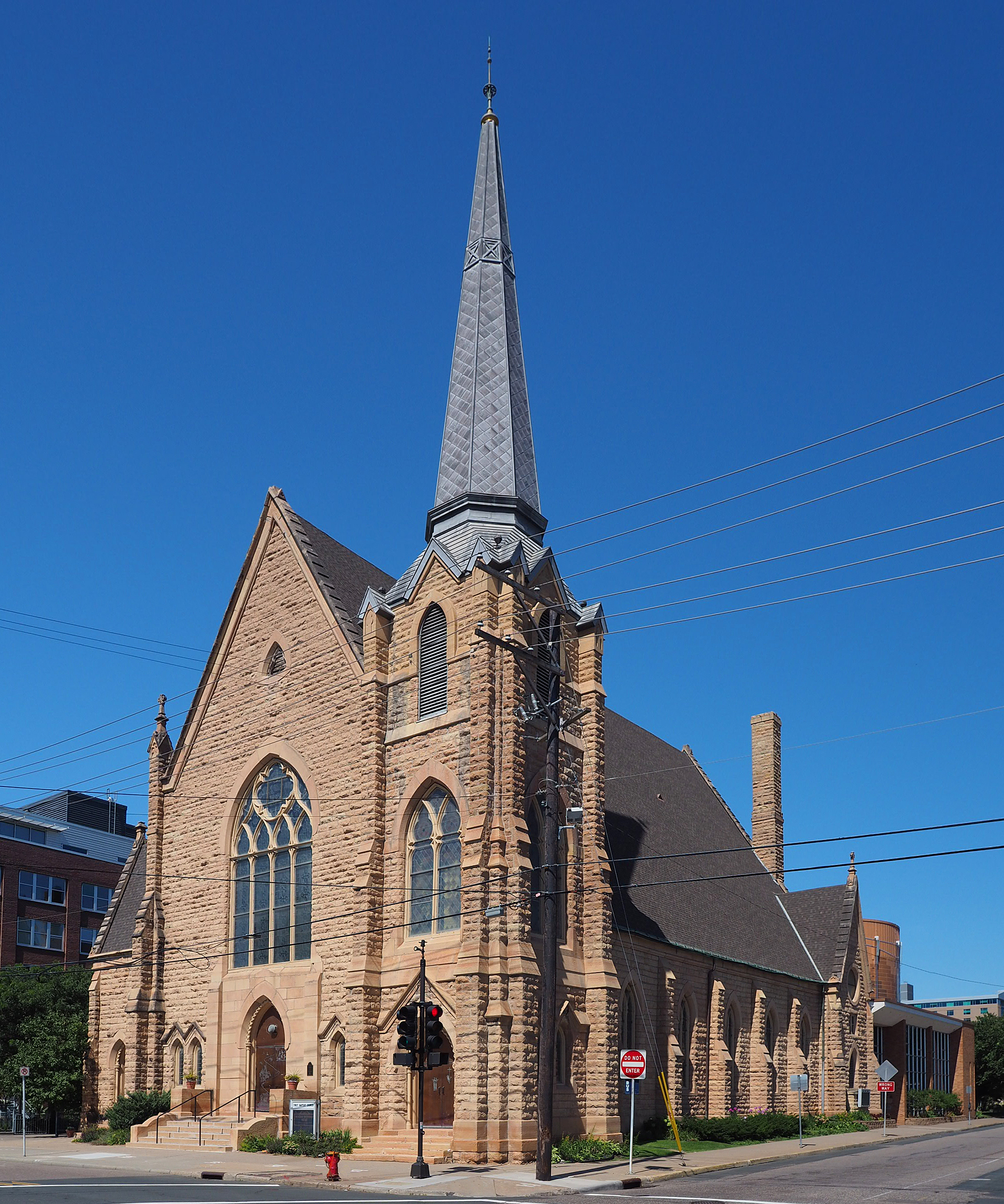
- First Baptist Church from the east

- Location within Minnesota Location within the United States
- Location: 499 Wacouta Street; Saint Paul, Minnesota
- Coordinates: 44°57′9″N 93°5′24.5″W
- Built: 1875
- Built by: Monroe & Romaine Sheire
- Architect: William W. Boyington
- Architectural style: Gothic Revival
- NRHP reference No.: 83000929
- Added to NRHP: February 24, 1983

The First Baptist Church of St. Paul is an historic church building in Saint Paul, Minnesota, United States. The original steeple, which rose 145 feet (44 m) above the ground, was removed in 1945. The stone base was sinking into the marshy soil and causing structural strain on the rest of the building. A new, shorter steeple was erected, but without the belfry and clock that the original steeple had.

The church was listed on the National Register of Historic Places in 1983. When it opened on May 31, 1875, it was the largest and most costly church in Saint Paul, described in the Pioneer Press as "the finest piece of architecture west of Chicago".

== History ==
The congregation started as a Sunday school run by Harriet Bishop in 1847. She came from Vermont to the St. Paul area, still a part of Wisconsin Territory before Minnesota Territory was organized, after hearing that there were about thirty children who had no school or teacher. The school was originally located in an old blacksmith shop, which she described as "a mud-walled log hovel covered with bark and chinked with mud." A new schoolhouse was built on Jackson Street. On February 8, 1849, the Reverend John Parsons was appointed as a missionary to St. Paul. He preached in the schoolhouse at the start. On December 29, 1849, the church formally organized itself. They made immediate plans to build a church on "Baptist Hill", now part of Mears Park.

The congregation needed more money than they could raise locally, so Parsons traveled east to New York in 1851 to raise donations. Unfortunately he was robbed in New York City, and he lost the entire amount of $2,300 that he had raised. He spent a couple months recovering his injuries, then set out to return to St. Paul. He died on a riverboat north of St. Louis, Missouri. His funeral was the first service held in the newly built church, which was financed by loans raised in anticipation of Parsons' funds.

In 1857 Baptist Hill was graded down to the same level as the surrounding area, leaving the small church 20 feet (6.1 m) above its surroundings. The congregation looked for a new site and built a new church on Wacouta Street, which opened on January 1, 1862. This was a larger stone structure, but the rapidly expanding community outgrew its second structure. William W. Boyington of Chicago was commissioned to design a new building, located nearby at the corner of Ninth and Wacouta.
