= National Register of Historic Places listings in Ramsey County, Minnesota =

Location of Ramsey County in Minnesota

This is a complete list of National Register of Historic Places listings in Ramsey County, Minnesota. It is intended to be a complete list of the properties and districts on the National Register of Historic Places in Ramsey County, Minnesota, United States. The locations of National Register properties and districts for which the latitude and longitude coordinates are included below, may be seen in an online map.

There are 129 properties in the county listed on the National Register of Historic Places including three National Historic Landmarks. A supplementary list includes five additional sites that were formerly listed on the National Register.

This National Park Service list is complete through NPS recent listings posted October 23, 2026.

== History ==
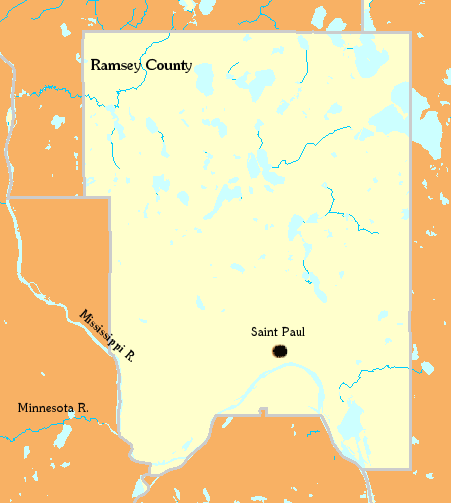
Ramsey County

Ramsey County is a county located in the southeastern part of the U.S. state of Minnesota, bounded in some places by the Mississippi River, by Hennepin County, Anoka County, Washington County, and Dakota County. All of the county seat, Saint Paul, is in the county, including Saint Paul's "West Side" neighborhood, which is south of the Mississippi River.

The county's historic places include houses, places of worship, commerce, and education, and community centers and infrastructure. Several districts encompass several structures of related historic significance. Some of the oldest structures in the state are in Ramsey County, representing the earliest of non-indigenous residents in the state. As the northernmost natural port on the Upper Mississippi River, Saint Paul grew, handling both river and rail freight and passenger traffic. Even as Minneapolis (in Hennepin County) eventually surpassed Saint Paul in the volume of commerce, Saint Paul remained relevant as the state capital and associated government services and employment kept the county growing. Several of the sites are specifically related to the various first-generation immigrant populations that made Ramsey County their new home in the United States, especially Germans, Czechs, Scandinavians, and Austro-Hungarians, which together comprised the majority of residents in the first century of the county's history.

== Current listings ==
	Name on the Register	Image	Date listed	Location	City or town	Description
1	3M Administration Building	3M Administration Building	January 27, 2015 (#14001212)	777 Forest St. 44°57′53″N 93°03′46″W	Saint Paul	Moderne headquarters of 3M from 1940 to 1962, reflecting the corporation's success through research, product development, and diversification.
2	Amhoist Tower	Amhoist Tower	June 3, 2022 (#100007789)	345 Saint Peter St., 59 4th St. W. 44°56′40″N 93°05′43″W	Saint Paul	1983 headquarters of American Hoist & Derrick, a nationally significant manufacturer of heavy equipment active 1882–1985, and one of the largest companies based in Saint Paul.
3	Arlington Hills Library	Arlington Hills Library	February 10, 1984 (#84001660)	1105 Greenbrier St. 44°58′28″N 93°04′16″W	Saint Paul	1916 Carnegie library, one of three in Saint Paul and one of the last built in the U.S. Also noted as an early project of city architect Charles A. Hausler and an important Beaux-Arts neighborhood landmark. Now the East Side Freedom Library.
4	John M. Armstrong House	John M. Armstrong House	January 27, 1983 (#83000925)	225 Eagle Pkwy. 44°56′28″N 93°06′03″W	Saint Paul	Sophisticated early work of architect Edward Bassford—built in 1886—and downtown Saint Paul's only surviving semi-detached house.
5	Assumption School	Assumption School	March 26, 1975 (#75001005)	68 Exchange St. 44°56′51″N 93°06′00″W	Saint Paul	Early parochial school active 1864–1888 in educating children of the Church of the Assumption's largely German immigrant congregation. Also noted for its limestone Italianate architecture.
6	Dr. Ward Beebe House	Dr. Ward Beebe House	August 29, 1977 (#77000762)	2022 Summit Ave. 44°56′28″N 93°11′09″W	Saint Paul	1912 house representative of Purcell & Elmslie's local Prairie School residences. Also a contributing property to the West Summit Avenue Historic District.
7	Blair Flats	Blair Flats	July 18, 1975 (#75001006)	165 Western Ave. 44°56′47″N 93°06′58″W	Saint Paul	Highly fashionable 1887 Victorian apartment building commissioned by entrepreneur Frank P. Blair. Also a contributing property to the Historic Hill District.
8	Bridges No. L-5853 and 92247	Bridges No. L-5853 and 92247	November 6, 1989 (#89001842)	Lexington Ave. in Como Park; 44°58′42″N 93°08′47″W	Saint Paul	Minnesota's second-oldest reinforced-concrete arch bridges, designed in 1904 by William S. Hewett using Josef Melan's revolutionary reinforcing system.
9	Markell and Edward Brooks Sr. House	Markell and Edward Brooks Sr. House	June 15, 2000 (#00000689)	176 Mississippi River Blvd. N. 44°56′47″N 93°11′54″W	Saint Paul	Exemplary 1920s Colonial Revival estate designed and expanded by Clarence H. Johnston Sr.'s firm. Now Eastcliff, the official residence of the University of Minnesota system president.
10	Benjamin Brunson House	Benjamin Brunson House	May 12, 1975 (#75001007)	485 Kenny Rd. 44°57′27″N 93°04′48″W	Saint Paul	1855 Federal house of pioneering civic leader Benjamin Brunson (1823–1898), surveyor and co-founder of Saint Paul.
11	Casiville Bullard House	Casiville Bullard House	January 9, 1997 (#96001559)	1282 Folsom St. 44°58′48″N 93°07′57″W	Saint Paul	1909 house built for himself by prolific stonemason and bricklayer Casiville Bullard (1873–1959), one of Saint Paul's few skilled African Americans working in the building trade in the early 20th century.
12	Burbank-Livingston-Griggs House	Burbank-Livingston-Griggs House	October 15, 1970 (#70000307)	432 Summit Ave. 44°56′27″N 93°07′06″W	Saint Paul	1863 limestone house considered one of Minnesota's most elaborate examples of mid-19th-century Italianate architecture. Also a contributing property to the Historic Hill District.
13	Pierce and Walter Butler House	Pierce and Walter Butler House	April 22, 1982 (#82004625)	1345–1347 Summit Ave. 44°56′31″N 93°09′26″W	Saint Paul	Distinctive 1900 double house of brothers Pierce Butler (a U.S. Supreme Court justice 1923–1939) and Walter Butler (a leading Midwestern contractor). Also a contributing property to the West Summit Avenue Historic District.
14	C.S.P.S. Hall	C.S.P.S. Hall	February 17, 1977 (#77000763)	381–383 Michigan St. 44°56′07″N 93°06′58″W	Saint Paul	1887 Czech-Slovak Protective Society meeting hall serving Saint Paul's small but active Czech American community.
15	Central Presbyterian Church	Central Presbyterian Church	February 10, 1983 (#83000926)	500 Cedar St. 44°56′59″N 93°05′46″W	Saint Paul	One of Saint Paul's largest and finest Richardsonian Romanesque churches, built 1888–90, and one of its few designs by Minneapolis-based church architect Warren H. Hayes.
16	Church of St. Agnes-Catholic	Church of St. Agnes-Catholic	November 19, 1980 (#80002125)	548 Lafond Ave. 44°57′35″N 93°07′24″W	Saint Paul	Landmark Baroque Revival church built 1901–12 for an Austro-Hungarian immigrant congregation.
17	Church of St. Bernard-Catholic	Church of St. Bernard-Catholic	February 24, 1983 (#83000927)	197 Geranium Ave. W. 44°58′33″N 93°06′28″W	Saint Paul	Church built 1905–14 noted for its innovative Prairie School/Art Nouveau design and early reinforced-concrete construction, and as a masterpiece of architect John Jager (1871–1959).
18	Church of St. Casimir-Catholic	Church of St. Casimir-Catholic	March 31, 1983 (#83000939)	937 Jessamine Ave. E. 44°58′30″N 93°03′40″W	Saint Paul	1904 Beaux-Arts church built for a Polish immigrant congregation.
19	Church of the Assumption-Catholic	Church of the Assumption-Catholic	February 10, 1975 (#75001008)	51 9th St. W. 44°56′51″N 93°05′57″W	Saint Paul	Romanesque Revival church based on the Ludwigskirche in Munich, built 1870–74 for a German immigrant congregation.
20	Cyrus B. Cobb House	Cyrus B. Cobb House	April 14, 1983 (#83000928)	2199 1st St. 45°04′57″N 93°00′28″W	White Bear Lake	1885 Queen Anne residence, one of White Bear Lake's oldest intact brick and Victorian-era houses.
21	Colorado Street Bridge	Colorado Street Bridge	July 5, 1990 (#90000977)	East side of S. Wabasha St. near Terrace Park; 44°56′05″N 93°05′03″W	Saint Paul	Unusual 1888 skew arch bridge, at 70 feet (21 m) also the longest masonry arch bridge built on a Minnesota highway. Converted to pedestrian use in the 1970s.
22	Commerce Building	Commerce Building	July 3, 2007 (#07000645)	8 4th St. E. 44°56′42″N 93°05′36″W	Saint Paul	1912 office building serving as headquarters for two commerce associations 1912–21, symbolic of the business networking organizations that influenced Saint Paul's late-19th/early-20th-century economic and civic growth.
23	Como Park Conservatory	Como Park Conservatory	November 19, 1974 (#74001033)	1225 Estabrook Dr. 44°58′53″N 93°09′03″W	Saint Paul	City botanical conservatory of glass and iron/steel trusses, built 1914–15.
24	William and Catherine Davern Farm House	William and Catherine Davern Farm House	October 6, 1983 (#83003765)	1173 Davern St. S. 44°54′22″N 93°10′22″W	Saint Paul	Rare surviving Italianate farmhouse of one of Saint Paul's earliest farming families, built c. 1862.
25	Degree of Honor Protective Association Building	Degree of Honor Protective Association Building	March 5, 2021 (#100004657)	325 Cedar St. 44°56′43″N 93°05′33″W	Saint Paul	National headquarters of the Degree of Honor Protective Association whose completion in 1961 ushered in the organization's peak decade of influence on the insurance market.
26	Derham Hall and Our Lady of Victory Chapel, College of Saint Catherine	Derham Hall and Our Lady of Victory Chapel, College of Saint Catherine	October 31, 1985 (#85003423)	2004 Randolph Ave. 44°55′32″N 93°11′04″W	Saint Paul	1903 campus hall and 1923 Romanesque Revival chapel, the oldest structures at St. Catherine University.
27	Euclid View Flats	Euclid View Flats	February 10, 2014 (#13001170)	234–238 Bates Ave. 44°57′14″N 93°03′59″W	Saint Paul	Early example of an apartment building designed to appeal to the middle class, constructed 1894–95 in a transitional Queen Anne/Romanesque Revival style.
28	Farmers Union Grain Terminal Association Headquarters	Farmers Union Grain Terminal Association Headquarters	June 4, 2020 (#100005248)	1667 Snelling Ave. N. 44°59′29″N 93°10′03″W	Falcon Heights	Two-building office complex constructed in 1947 and expanded in 1957, significant as an outstanding example of late Moderne architecture.
29	Finch, Vanslyck, and McConville Dry Goods Company Building	Finch, Vanslyck, and McConville Dry Goods Company Building	February 1, 1982 (#82004626)	366 Wacouta St. 44°56′59″N 93°05′13″W	Saint Paul	Large warehouse built in 1911 (expanded 1923), representative of Saint Paul's major wholesaling industry. Also a contributing property to the Lowertown Historic District.
30	Fire Station No. 19	Fire Station No. 19	March 23, 2023 (#100008806)	1570 Highland Pkwy. 44°55′10″N 93°10′00″W	Saint Paul	1930 fire station representative of the early-20th-century formalization and expansion of Saint Paul city services and the development of the Highland Park neighborhood.
31	First Baptist Church of Saint Paul	First Baptist Church of Saint Paul	February 24, 1983 (#83000929)	499 Wacouta St. 44°57′09″N 93°05′24″W	Saint Paul	Costly 1874 Gothic Revival church designed by William W. Boyington in the now largely-vanished Lowertown neighborhood for Minnesota's oldest Baptist congregation.
32	First National Bank of White Bear	First National Bank of White Bear	February 24, 1983 (#83000930)	4744 Washington Ave. 45°05′05″N 93°00′32″W	White Bear Lake	1921 Neoclassical bank with an atypical Spanish tile eave; White Bear Lake's most sophisticated early commercial building and a key financial institution in its growth from a resort town to an established city.
33	F. Scott Fitzgerald House	F. Scott Fitzgerald House	November 11, 1971 (#71000440)	599 Summit Ave. 44°56′29″N 93°07′30″W	Saint Paul	Rowhouse where author F. Scott Fitzgerald lived with his parents 1919–20 while writing This Side of Paradise, his first novel to be published. Also a contributing property to the Historic Hill District.
34	Fitzpatrick Building	Fitzpatrick Building	July 19, 1990 (#90001113)	465–467 Wabasha St. N. 44°56′54″N 93°05′50″W	Saint Paul	Well-preserved 1890 example of the Queen Anne commercial buildings of downtown Saint Paul's 1880s–1890s boom.
35	Foss House	Foss House	May 19, 1983 (#83000931)	321 Silver Lake Rd. SW; 45°02′40″N 93°13′03″W	New Brighton	Large c. 1896 Victorian house of an early family that settled the then-rural outskirts of New Brighton.
36	Germania Bank Building	Germania Bank Building	December 6, 1977 (#77000764)	6 5th St. W. 44°56′44″N 93°05′41″W	Saint Paul	1889 Richardsonian Romanesque office building designed by J. Walter Stevens and Harvey Ellis; Saint Paul's only surviving brownstone skyscraper.
37	Heman Gibbs Farmstead	Heman Gibbs Farmstead	April 23, 1975 (#75001009)	2097 Larpenteur Ave. 44°59′32″N 93°11′18″W	Falcon Heights	Rare surviving farm in the Minneapolis–Saint Paul metro, established in 1849, featuring a farmhouse dating to 1854 and a 1910 barn. Now part of the Gibbs Museum of Pioneer and Dakotah Life.
38	Giesen-Hauser House	Giesen-Hauser House	May 19, 1983 (#83000932)	827 Mound St. 44°57′03″N 93°03′43″W	Saint Paul	1891 Queen Anne house, only intact surviving work of local architect Albert Zschocke, owned successively by Peter Joseph Giesen and Eric V. Hauser, prosperous businessmen and civic leaders.
39	Henry Hale Memorial Library, Hamline Branch	Henry Hale Memorial Library, Hamline Branch	January 30, 2023 (#100008536)	1558 Minnehaha Ave. W. 44°57′45″N 93°09′58″W	Saint Paul	1930 branch library, the culmination of neighborhood efforts to secure local Saint Paul Public Library services, and a longstanding community center. Better known as the Hamline Midway Library. Demolished in 2025.
40	Hamline Methodist Episcopal Church	Hamline Methodist Episcopal Church	December 22, 2011 (#11000950)	1514 Englewood Ave. 44°57′49″N 93°09′53″W	Saint Paul	1928 Gothic Revival church exhibiting high craftsmanship by local architects Slifer & Abrahamson and stained glass artist Andreas R. Larsen.
41	Hamm Building	Hamm Building	May 30, 1997 (#97000499)	408 Saint Peter St. 44°56′47″N 93°05′48″W	Saint Paul	Commercial building built 1915–20, significant for its atypical cantilevered steel construction and grand terracotta exterior.
42	Harriet Island Pavilion	Harriet Island Pavilion	July 10, 1992 (#92000821)	75 Water St. 44°56′15″N 93°05′50″W	Saint Paul	Prominent 1941 Moderne park shelter designed by Clarence W. Wigington, believed to be the nation's first African American municipal architect. Renamed the Wigington Pavilion in 2000 in his honor.
43	Highland Park Tower	Highland Park Tower	July 17, 1986 (#86001670)	1570 Highland Pkwy. 44°55′03″N 93°10′00″W	Saint Paul	Octagonal 1928 water tower noted for its architectural significance, iconic status to the neighborhood, and association with pioneering black architect Clarence W. Wigington.
44	James J. Hill House	James J. Hill House	October 15, 1966 (#66000405)	240 Summit Ave. 44°56′42″N 93°06′32″W	Saint Paul	1889 mansion of railroad magnate and financier James J. Hill (1838–1916). Also a contributing property to the Historic Hill District.
45	James J. Hill's North Oaks Farm, Dairy Building	James J. Hill's North Oaks Farm, Dairy Building	May 16, 1997 (#97000441)	35 Hill Farm Circle; 45°05′33″N 93°06′30″W	North Oaks	State-of-the-art 1884 demonstration creamery representing James J. Hill's promotion of diversified farming in the American Northwest.
46	Ann Charlotte and Jacob Hinkel House	Ann Charlotte and Jacob Hinkel House	January 3, 1978 (#78001558)	531 Brainerd Ave. 44°58′49″N 93°04′42″W	Saint Paul	1872 Italianate house, rare example of a wealthy country estate that has survived Saint Paul's urban expansion.
47	Historic Hill District	Historic Hill District	August 13, 1976 (#76001067)	Irregular pattern from Pleasant and Grand Aves. to Holly and Marshall Aves., from Lexington Pkwy. to 4th and Pleasant Sts. 44°56′37″N 93°07′07″W	Saint Paul	Minnesota's largest concentration of late-19th- and early-20th-century architectural styles built for the upper and upper-middle class, with 980 contributing properties on 75 blocks.
48	E. H. Hobe House-Solheim	E. H. Hobe House-Solheim	May 19, 1983 (#83000933)	5590 Bald Eagle Blvd. W. 45°06′37″N 93°01′35″W	White Bear Lake	1897 Victorian mansion of Norwegian American diplomat Engelbrecht H. Hobe (1860–1940), longtime consul for the United Kingdoms of Sweden and Norway.
49	Holman Field Administration Building	Holman Field Administration Building	August 15, 1991 (#91001004)	644 Bayfield St. 44°56′31″N 93°03′53″W	Saint Paul	Sophisticated 1939 Moderne airport terminal designed by pioneering Black architect Clarence W. Wigington and built in cooperation with the Works Progress Administration.
50	Hope Engine Company No. 3	Hope Engine Company No. 3	May 22, 2020 (#100005237)	1 S. Leech St. 44°56′28″N 93°06′29″W	Saint Paul	Fire station attesting to the development of the Saint Paul Fire Department; built in 1872 and only retrofitted for motorized equipment in 1940.
51	Indian Mounds Park Mound Group	Indian Mounds Park Mound Group	April 11, 2014 (#14000140)	1075 Mounds Blvd. 44°56′45″N 93°03′24″W	Saint Paul	Prominent blufftop burial mound site in use c. 1000 BCE to 1837 by the northernmost Hopewell tradition people up to early-contact Dakota people. Also noted as a focus of the earliest archaeological efforts in Minnesota 1856–1900.
52	Intercity Bridge	Intercity Bridge	November 6, 1989 (#89001838)	Ford Pkwy. over Mississippi River; 44°55′04″N 93°12′05″W	Saint Paul	Monumental 1927 reinforced-concrete continuous-rib arch bridge designed by Martin Sigvart Grytbak. Extends into Hennepin County and better known as the Ford Bridge.
53	Horace Hills Irvine House	Horace Hills Irvine House	December 16, 1974 (#74001034)	1006 Summit Ave. 44°56′28″N 93°08′33″W	Saint Paul	1911 Tudor Revival mansion designed by William Channing Whitney, donated to the state in 1965 to become the official Minnesota Governor's Residence. Also a contributing property to the Historic Hill District.
54	Irvine Park Historic District	Irvine Park Historic District	November 27, 1973 (#73000993)	Roughly bounded by Irvine Park, W. 7th, Walnut, and Sherman; 44°56′27″N 93°06′10″W	Saint Paul	Residential district preserving the fine homes of many of Minnesota's early leading citizens, with 20 contributing properties built 1849–1889.
55	Frank B. Kellogg House	Frank B. Kellogg House	November 6, 1974 (#74001035)	633 Fairmount Ave. 44°56′14″N 93°07′36″W	Saint Paul	1889 Queen Anne/Richardsonian Romanesque house of Frank B. Kellogg (1856–1937), who helped transform U.S. foreign policy as Secretary of State 1925–1929.
56	Krank Manufacturing Company	Krank Manufacturing Company	February 24, 1983 (#83000934)	1855 University Ave. W. 44°57′25″N 93°10′45″W	Saint Paul	Exceptional 1926 industrial building designed by Toltz, King & Day with terracotta ornamentation. Also associated with the development of Saint Paul's Midway neighborhood and Minnesota's cosmetics industry.
57	Lauer Flats	Lauer Flats	June 5, 1975 (#75001010)	226 Western Ave. S. 44°56′04″N 93°06′56″W	Saint Paul	Elegantly restrained 1887 Italianate apartment building featuring precise and largely unornamented stonework.
58	Olaf Lee House	Olaf Lee House	February 16, 1984 (#84001670)	955 Jessie St. N. 44°58′12″N 93°04′40″W	Saint Paul	Unusual 1905 house designed by Clarence H. Johnston Sr. in an eclectic Swiss chalet/American Craftsman style.
59	Lock and Dam No. 2	Lock and Dam No. 2	June 13, 2003 (#03000522)	Mississippi River north of Lake St./Marshall Ave. 44°57′14″N 93°12′28″W	Saint Paul	Remains of the first lock and dam complex on the Upper Mississippi River, in use 1907–1912. Better known as the Meeker Island Lock and Dam, it's primarily listed in Hennepin County but extends into Ramsey County.
60	Lowertown Historic District	Lowertown Historic District	February 21, 1983 (#83000935)	Roughly bounded by Kellogg Blvd., Broadway, 7th and Jackson Sts. 44°56′58″N 93°05′16″W	Saint Paul	16-block warehouse and wholesaling district with 37 contributing properties built 1890s–1910, significant for its river and rail connections, economic impact, architecture, and urban planning.
61	David Luckert House	David Luckert House	May 12, 1975 (#75001011)	480 Iglehart St. 44°56′58″N 93°07′13″W	Saint Paul	Well-preserved limestone house built in the late 1850s, one of the oldest houses in Saint Paul outside of the city's historic core.
62	Manhattan Building	Manhattan Building	June 22, 1988 (#88001128)	360 Robert St. N. 44°56′51″N 93°05′26″W	Saint Paul	1890 Renaissance Revival bank and office building dating to Saint Paul's 1880s–1890s boom, designed and then tenanted by Clarence H. Johnston Sr. while serving as State Architect 1891–1936.
63	Andrew R. McGill House	Andrew R. McGill House	December 31, 1974 (#74001037)	2203 Scudder Ave. 44°58′37″N 93°11′31″W	Saint Paul	1888 Queen Anne mansion of politician Andrew Ryan McGill, governor of Minnesota 1887–1889 and later a state senator and Saint Paul postmaster.
64	Mendota Road Bridge	Mendota Road Bridge	November 6, 1989 (#89001825)	Water St. over Pickerel Lake Outlet; 44°55′29″N 93°06′43″W	Saint Paul	1894 masonry arch bridge, a rare Saint Paul example of a small, 19th-century, city bridge that hasn't been replaced or altered.
65	Merchants National Bank	Merchants National Bank	December 19, 1974 (#74001036)	366–368 Jackson St. 44°56′54″N 93°05′22″W	Saint Paul	1892 remnant of the sandstone Richardsonian Romanesque buildings of Saint Paul's late-19th-century growth, designed by Edward Bassford to house an influential bank and the law offices of several prominent Minnesotans. Now known as the Brooks Building.
66	Mickey's Diner	Mickey's Diner	February 24, 1983 (#83000936)	36 7th St. W. 44°56′51″N 93°05′53″W	Saint Paul	Minnesota's only surviving classic Streamline Moderne diner, prefabricated with a railroad car motif in 1937 and in continuous operation since 1939.
67	Minnesota Boat Club Boathouse on Raspberry Island	Minnesota Boat Club Boathouse on Raspberry Island	February 4, 1982 (#82004627)	1 Wabasha St. S. 44°56′31″N 93°05′29″W	Saint Paul	1910 clubhouse of Minnesota's oldest athletic organization, a rowing club founded in 1870.
68	Minnesota Building	Minnesota Building	June 10, 2009 (#09000408)	46 E. 4th St. 44°56′44″N 93°05′31″W	Saint Paul	1929 office building that introduced Art Deco and Moderne architecture to downtown Saint Paul, styles which flourished there until 1942.
69	Minnesota Historical Society Building	Minnesota Historical Society Building	March 20, 1973 (#73000994)	690 Cedar St. 44°57′17″N 93°06′00″W	Saint Paul	Headquarters from 1918 to 1992 of the Minnesota Historical Society, founded in 1849 as the state's oldest institution. Also noted for its architectural contribution to the Capitol complex. Now the Minnesota Judicial Center.
70	Minnesota Milk Company Building	Minnesota Milk Company Building	February 5, 2014 (#13001148)	370 W. University Ave. 44°57′19″N 93°06′57″W	Saint Paul	Saint Paul's best surviving example of an urban milk processing facility from the first half of the 20th century, operated by the Minnesota Milk Company 1913–1960.
71	Minnesota Mutual Life Insurance Company Building	Minnesota Mutual Life Insurance Company Building	June 5, 2017 (#100001025)	345 Cedar St. 44°56′45″N 93°05′35″W	Saint Paul	Headquarters built in 1955 for one of the nation's largest life insurance companies (now Securian Financial Group); also noted as an early example of International Style in Saint Paul and the first major office building constructed in downtown after World War II.
72	Minnesota State Capitol	Minnesota State Capitol	February 23, 1972 (#72000681)	75 Rev. Dr. Martin Luther King, Jr. Blvd. 44°57′19″N 93°06′06″W	Saint Paul	Classical Revival capitol designed by Cass Gilbert and built 1896–1905, called "the most perfectly executed monumental public building in the entire state" in its NRHP nomination.
73	Mni Owe Sni / Coldwater Spring	Mni Owe Sni / Coldwater Spring	November 3, 2023 (#100009497)	Address Restricted; 45°53′58″N 93°11′46″W	Saint Paul	Sacred site to the Dakota people and used as a camp by soldiers building Fort Snelling
74	Adolf Muench House	Adolf Muench House	May 12, 1975 (#75001012)	653 5th St. E. 44°57′21″N 93°04′23″W	Saint Paul	1884 Queen Anne house of one of the four Muench brothers, 1850s German immigrants who were significant in the early development of Saint Paul and Minnesota.
75	Northern Federal Building	Northern Federal Building	October 3, 2024 (#100010566)	386 Wabasha St. N. 44°56′47″N 93°05′41″W	Saint Paul	1973 office building whose glass-clad design represents late modernism in downtown Saint Paul.
76	Northern Pacific Railway Company Como Shops Historic District	Northern Pacific Railway Company Como Shops Historic District	March 31, 1983 (#83000937)	Energy Park Dr. and Bandana Blvd. 44°58′21″N 93°09′16″W	Saint Paul	Eight surviving buildings constructed 1885–1920 for the Northern Pacific Railway's passenger car service complex, associated with railroad development and population growth in Saint Paul and the northwestern U.S. Now known as Bandana Square.
77	Norway Lutheran Church	Norway Lutheran Church	May 12, 1975 (#75001013)	2375 Como Ave. W. 44°59′03″N 93°11′42″W	Saint Paul	First Norwegian Lutheran church in America, built in 1843 in the Muskego Settlement, Wisconsin, and moved to Luther Seminary in Saint Paul in 1904. Also noted as an example of pioneer log construction.
78	Norwegian Evangelical Lutheran Church	Norwegian Evangelical Lutheran Church	November 15, 2019 (#100004655)	105 University Ave. 44°57′22″N 93°06′15″W	Saint Paul	Lutheran church complex built 1909–1915, atypically designed in Beaux-Arts style by Buechner & Orth to harmonize with the nearby Minnesota State Capitol. Now Christ Lutheran Church on Capitol Hill.
79	Charles P. Noyes Cottage	Charles P. Noyes Cottage	December 12, 1976 (#76001070)	4735 Lake Ave. 45°05′07″N 93°00′09″W	White Bear Lake	Lakeside 1869 Stick style summer cottage, example of the "close-to-nature" retreats built on the urban fringe in the late 19th century. Now the White Bear Lake Area Historical Society's Fillebrown House museum.
80	O'Donnell Shoe Company Building	O'Donnell Shoe Company Building	August 20, 2009 (#09000623)	509 Sibley St. 44°57′09″N 93°05′29″W	Saint Paul	Factory in operation 1914–1935 of Minnesota's leading shoe manufacturer, a remnant of Saint Paul's once-prominent shoemaking industry.
81	Old Federal Courts Building	Old Federal Courts Building	March 24, 1969 (#69000076)	109 5th St. W. 44°56′44″N 93°05′50″W	Saint Paul	Exemplary Richardsonian Romanesque/Châteauesque federal building built 1894–1901. Now a cultural venue known as Landmark Center.
82	Old Main, Macalester College	Old Main, Macalester College	August 16, 1977 (#77000765)	1600 Grand Ave. 44°56′19″N 93°10′06″W	Saint Paul	1888 Richardsonian Romanesque campus building designed by William H. Willcox; the oldest standing structure at Macalester College. The 1884 east wing, part of the original nomination, has been replaced.
83	Osborn Building	Osborn Building	December 13, 2018 (#100003233)	370 N. Wabasha St. 44°56′46″N 93°05′39″W	Saint Paul	1968 office building noted for its exemplary International Style architecture, conveying a clean, modern identity as corporate headquarters for Ecolab until 2015.
84	Payne Avenue State Bank	Payne Avenue State Bank	May 15, 2007 (#07000426)	965 Payne Ave. 44°58′13″N 93°04′26″W	Saint Paul	1923 neighborhood bank that provided financial services and commercial space to the largely Swedish American community of Saint Paul's East Side.
85	Pilgrim Baptist Church	Pilgrim Baptist Church	April 16, 1991 (#91000438)	732 Central Ave. W. 44°57′10″N 93°07′52″W	Saint Paul	1928 church associated with the spiritual, social, and political life of African Americans in the Twin Cities, and with the Reverend L.W. Harris, the congregation's politically active leader from 1922 to 1941.
86	Pioneer and Endicott Buildings	Pioneer and Endicott Buildings	July 10, 1974 (#74001038)	141 4th St. E. 44°56′50″N 93°05′23″W	Saint Paul	Architecturally significant office buildings connected in 1941. Cass Gilbert designed the L-shaped Renaissance Revival Endicott Building in the 1890s to wrap around the 1889 Romanesque Revival Pioneer Building designed by Solon Spencer Beman.
87	Ramsey County Poor Farm Barn	Ramsey County Poor Farm Barn	September 22, 1977 (#77000766)	2020 White Bear Ave. 45°00′01″N 93°01′27″W	Maplewood	Massive 1918 livestock barn of Ramsey County's poor farm, a substantial remnant of a once-common municipal welfare method.
88	Alexander Ramsey House	Alexander Ramsey House	November 25, 1969 (#69000077)	265 Exchange St. S. 44°56′30″N 93°06′16″W	Saint Paul	1868 Second Empire house of statesman Alexander Ramsey, who shaped the early years of Minnesota as governor and senator. Now a Minnesota Historical Society museum.
89	Justus Ramsey Stone House	Justus Ramsey Stone House	May 6, 1975 (#75001014)	252 7th St. W. 44°56′33″N 93°06′17″W	Saint Paul	Well-preserved pioneer cottage, built 1855–57, exhibiting fine masonry of local limestone.
90	Rau/Strong House	Rau/Strong House	June 18, 1975 (#75001015)	2 George St. 44°55′46″N 93°05′06″W	Saint Paul	Finely crafted "urban estate" built 1884–86, with an eclectic Italianate/Second Empire/Eastlake movement house and accompanying carriage barn, representative of Saint Paul's late-19th-century middle class residences.
91	Riverside Hangar	Riverside Hangar	December 27, 2007 (#07001315)	690 Bayfield St., Building 690-01-01; 44°56′30″N 93°03′43″W	Saint Paul	1942 hangar complex uniquely constructed of glued laminated timber arches, a creative response to a World War II steel shortage.
92	Riverview Branch Library	Riverview Branch Library	February 10, 1984 (#84001672)	1 George St. E. 44°55′48″N 93°05′05″W	Saint Paul	1916 Carnegie library, one of three in Saint Paul and one of the last built in the U.S. Also noted as an early project of city architect Charles A. Hausler and an important Beaux-Arts neighborhood landmark.
93	Robert Street Bridge	Robert Street Bridge	November 6, 1989 (#89001846)	Robert St. over Mississippi River; 44°56′38″N 93°05′15″W	Saint Paul	Exemplary multi-span reinforced-concrete arch bridge with one monumental through arch span, built 1924–26 and tightly engineered to accommodate adjacent river, road, and rail traffic.
94	Rochat-Louise-Sauerwein Block	Rochat-Louise-Sauerwein Block	November 19, 1980 (#80002126)	261–277 7th St. W. 44°56′33″N 93°06′20″W	Saint Paul	Adjacent commercial/residential buildings constructed 1884, 1885, and 1895; examples of fine Victorian architecture and remnants of what once lined West Seventh Street.
95	Roselawn Chapel and Administration Building	Roselawn Chapel and Administration Building	January 19, 2021 (#100006008)	803 W. Larpenteur Ave. 44°59′32″N 93°08′08″W	Roseville	1904 cemetery entrance complex noted for its distinctive Gothic and Elizabethan Revival design by Thomas G. Holyoke in consultation with Cass Gilbert.
96	St. Agatha's Conservatory of Music and Arts	St. Agatha's Conservatory of Music and Arts	May 25, 1989 (#89000443)	26 Exchange St. E. 44°56′58″N 93°05′48″W	Saint Paul	Building constructed 1908–1910 for the Twin Cities' oldest school of fine arts, established in 1884. Now known as the Exchange Building.
97	St. Anthony Park Branch Library	St. Anthony Park Branch Library	February 10, 1984 (#84001675)	2245 Como Ave. W. 44°58′52″N 93°11′37″W	Saint Paul	1916 Carnegie library, one of three in Saint Paul and one of the last built in the U.S. Also noted as an early project of city architect Charles A. Hausler and an important Beaux-Arts neighborhood landmark.
98	St. Joseph's Academy	St. Joseph's Academy	June 5, 1975 (#75001016)	355 Marshall Ave. 44°56′57″N 93°06′54″W	Saint Paul	Minnesota's oldest standing Catholic school—whose original section dates to 1863—also noted for its early Italianate architecture in yellow limestone.
99	St. Joseph's Hospital Nurses Home	St. Joseph's Hospital Nurses Home	February 11, 2025 (#100006581)	438 Dorothy Day Pl. 44°56′53″N 93°06′06″W	Saint Paul	1926 nursing school, a pivotal avenue into professional employment for women in the early 20th century and a symbol of the longstanding educational efforts of the Sisters of St. Joseph of Carondelet in Saint Paul dating back to 1851.
100	St. Matthew's School	St. Matthew's School	November 8, 1984 (#84000243)	7 Robie St. W. 44°55′51″N 93°05′08″W	Saint Paul	1902 school building, one of Saint Paul's oldest, significant for its ornate Second Empire design by John F. Fischer and for providing parochial education to a neighborhood of mostly German Catholic immigrants.
101	St. Paul Casket Company	St. Paul Casket Company	April 12, 2021 (#100006372)	1222 University Ave. W. 44°57′19″N 93°09′07″W	Saint Paul	Prominent example of a 1920s vertical urban factory, home 1923–1951 of one of Minnesota's leading coffin manufacturers.
102	St. Paul Cathedral-Catholic	St. Paul Cathedral-Catholic	June 28, 1974 (#74001039)	239 Selby Ave. 44°56′49″N 93°06′32″W	Saint Paul	Monumental Beaux-Arts cathedral—called "one of the nation's grandest religious edifices" in its NRHP nomination—designed by Emmanuel Louis Masqueray. Principally built 1906–1915 but with interiors not completed by successors until 1953.
103	St. Paul City Hall and Ramsey County Courthouse	St. Paul City Hall and Ramsey County Courthouse	February 11, 1983 (#83000940)	15 Kellogg Blvd. W. 44°56′39″N 93°05′37″W	Saint Paul	Landmark 1930 Moderne building designed by Holabird & Root and Ellerbe & Co., long-serving government center and one of the nation's few Art Deco skyscrapers with an intact exterior and interior.
104	St. Paul, Minneapolis, & Manitoba Railway Company Shops Historic District	St. Paul, Minneapolis, & Manitoba Railway Company Shops Historic District	December 21, 1987 (#86003564)	Jackson St. and Pennsylvania Ave. 44°57′45″N 93°05′47″W	Saint Paul	Surviving three buildings from an 1882 St. Paul, Minneapolis and Manitoba Railway maintenance complex. Notable for their association with James J. Hill and the state's first successful railways, and their early limestone construction. District was increased in size June 19, 2017.
105	St. Paul Municipal Grain Terminal	St. Paul Municipal Grain Terminal	July 21, 2004 (#04000721)	266 Old Shepard Rd. 44°56′20″N 93°06′00″W	Saint Paul	Nation's first cooperative, farmer-owned terminal elevator, completed 1931, also associated with mechanical advances and the revitalization of grain transport on the Mississippi River.
106	St. Paul Public/James J. Hill Reference Library	St. Paul Public/James J. Hill Reference Library	September 11, 1975 (#75001017)	80–90 4th St. W. 44°56′38″N 93°05′50″W	Saint Paul	1917 Renaissance Revival joint library building, with the James J. Hill Reference Library wing further notable as an example of railroad magnate James J. Hill's philanthropic accomplishments.
107	St. Paul Union Depot	St. Paul Union Depot	December 18, 1974 (#74001040)	214 4th St. E. 44°56′52″N 93°05′10″W	Saint Paul	Landmark Neoclassical train station built 1917–23 by seven railways, symbol of Saint Paul's importance as a railroad hub and example of the era's monumental public buildings. Boundary increase on 2014-03-04.
108	St. Paul Women's City Club	St. Paul Women's City Club	March 19, 1982 (#82004628)	305 Saint Peter St. 44°56′38″N 93°05′41″W	Saint Paul	1931 women's club headquarters notable for its early and exemplary use of Moderne architecture in Saint Paul.
109	Salvation Army Women's Home and Hospital	Salvation Army Women's Home and Hospital	February 10, 1983 (#83000938)	1471 Como Ave. W. 44°58′41″N 93°09′46″W	Saint Paul	1912 Tudor Revival facility designed by Clarence H. Johnston Sr., where The Salvation Army provided charitable services to unwed mothers and their children up to 1971.
110	Charles W. Schneider House	Charles W. Schneider House	February 16, 1984 (#84001677)	1750 Ames Pl. E. 44°58′16″N 93°01′36″W	Saint Paul	1890 Shingle Style house, a style rare in Saint Paul, and the most architecturally significant standing house from the 1887 Hazel Park neighborhood development.
111	Schornstein Grocery and Saloon	Schornstein Grocery and Saloon	August 21, 1984 (#84001681)	707 Wilson Ave. E. and 223 Bates Ave. N. 44°57′12″N 93°03′59″W	Saint Paul	Ornate 1884 Victorian commercial building with an eclectic Second Empire/Italianate design by Augustus F. Gauger.
112	Seventh Street Improvement Arches	Seventh Street Improvement Arches	November 6, 1989 (#89001828)	E. 7th St. over Burlington Northern right-of-way 44°57′24″N 93°04′37″W	Saint Paul	1884 limestone double-arch bridge significant for its rare and challenging skewed, helicoidal design.
113	Sam S. Shubert Theatre and Shubert Building	Sam S. Shubert Theatre and Shubert Building	July 19, 2010 (#10000475)	488–494 Wabasha St. N. 44°56′56″N 93°05′51″W	Saint Paul	1910 Beaux-Arts Shubert Brothers theatre—important in Saint Paul's early fine theatre scene—and adjacent commercial building designed by Buechner & Orth. Now known as the Fitzgerald Theatre and Fitzgerald Condominiums.
114	Jacob Schmidt Brewing Company Historic District	Jacob Schmidt Brewing Company Historic District	October 5, 2018 (#100001974)	Roughly bounded by W. Jefferson St., Erle St., W. James Ave., and Toronto St. 44°55′47″N 93°07′28″W	Saint Paul	Complex of the Jacob Schmidt Brewing Company, one of Minnesota's leading breweries, with nine contributing properties built 1858–1950s further noted for their Romanesque Revival architecture by Barnard Barthel and Walter W. Magee, plus four residences and potential historical archaeology resources.
115	Frederick Spangenberg House	Frederick Spangenberg House	June 22, 1976 (#76001068)	375 Mt. Curve Blvd. 44°55′49″N 93°11′39″W	Saint Paul	One of Saint Paul's oldest standing stone farmhouses, built in 1864 of local limestone when the site was still on the rural outskirts of town.
116	Superior Packing Company	Superior Packing Company	November 5, 2018 (#100003083)	2103 Wabash Ave. 44°57′30″N 93°11′20″W	Saint Paul	Rare intact example of an early-20th-century cattle processing plant, whose sections dating from 1928 to 1947 reflect the evolving industry standards for slaughter and meatpacking.
117	Charles Thompson Memorial Hall	Charles Thompson Memorial Hall	December 22, 2011 (#11000949)	1824 Marshall Ave. 44°56′53″N 93°10′39″W	Saint Paul	1916 Neoclassical meeting hall designed by deaf architect Olof Hanson as the nation's first clubhouse built for a deaf community. A hub of social and advocacy activity credited with helping foster Minnesota as a preferred location among deaf people.
118	Triune Masonic Temple	Triune Masonic Temple	November 13, 1980 (#80002127)	1898 Iglehart Ave. 44°56′57″N 93°10′50″W	Saint Paul	One of Minnesota's earliest and best-preserved freestanding Masonic Temples, built 1910–11 in Neoclassical style by Henry C. Struchen.
119	United Church Seminary	United Church Seminary	October 31, 1985 (#85003437)	2481 Como Ave. 44°59′05″N 93°11′47″W	Saint Paul	1900 Beaux-Arts campus building designed by Omeyer & Thori; focal point of a longstanding Lutheran seminary. Now known as Luther Seminary's Bockman Hall.
120	United States Bedding Company	United States Bedding Company	July 24, 2020 (#100005358)	550 Vandalia St. 44°57′29″N 93°11′28″W	Saint Paul	Factory complex comprising two buildings and a water tower, home 1927–1984 of Saint Paul's largest and most successful mattress manufacturer, established in 1898.
121	United States Post Office and Custom House	United States Post Office and Custom House	May 19, 2014 (#14000218)	180 Kellogg Blvd. E. 44°56′47″N 93°05′13″W	Saint Paul	Center of Saint Paul's postal operations 1934–2010, with major additions in 1939 and 1961; associated with the 20th-century expansion and modernization of the United States Postal Service.
122	University Hall-Old Main, Hamline University	University Hall-Old Main, Hamline University	September 22, 1977 (#77000767)	1536 Hewitt Ave. 44°57′57″N 93°09′56″W	Saint Paul	1883 Victorian Gothic campus building designed by Warren H. Hayes; the oldest standing structure at Hamline University.
123	Vienna and Earl Apartment Buildings	Vienna and Earl Apartment Buildings	April 10, 1984 (#84001685)	682–688 Holly Ave. 44°56′35″N 93°07′45″W	Saint Paul	1907 Neoclassical luxury apartment buildings, the crowning work of architect Louis F. Lockwood and builder Carl P. Waldon.
124	Walsh Building	Walsh Building	May 25, 1989 (#89000444)	189–191 7th St. E. 44°57′03″N 93°05′27″W	Saint Paul	Built in 1888, a highly ornamented example of a mixed commercial/residential building and the work of architect Edward Bassford.
125	Dwight H. and Clara M. Watson House	Dwight H. and Clara M. Watson House	December 16, 2019 (#100004757)	402 Hall St. 44°56′01″N 93°05′12″W	Saint Paul	1886 house designed by Cass Gilbert (1859–1934), an early-career work showcasing the detailed and eclectic style of an emerging master architect.
126	West Summit Avenue Historic District	West Summit Avenue Historic District	May 4, 1993 (#93000332)	Summit Ave. between Lexington Pkwy. and Mississippi River Blvd. 44°56′29″N 93°10′37″W	Saint Paul	42-block boulevard notable for its urban planning and assorted Period Revival architecture. A western continuation of the Historic Hill District, with 232 contributing properties built between 1885 and 1938.
127	White Bear Lake Armory	White Bear Lake Armory	March 25, 2019 (#100003532)	2228 4th St. 45°05′06″N 93°00′23″W	White Bear Lake	National Guard Armory built 1923–1929, one of Minnesota's few examples illustrating that decade's transition from heavy, fortresslike buildings to restrained Art Deco and Moderne designs.
128	Woodland Park Baptist Church	Woodland Park Baptist Church	April 20, 2021 (#100006404)	860 Laurel Ave. 44°56′41″N 93°08′10″W	Saint Paul	1907 Gothic Revival church, the only church in the Summit-University neighborhood built on the Akron Plan.
129	Woodland Park District	Woodland Park District	May 12, 1978 (#78001559)	Roughly bounded by Marshall and Selby Aves., Arundel and Dale Sts. 44°56′52″N 93°07′21″W	Saint Paul	Middle-class residential neighborhood exhibiting 12 distinct architectural styles popular in Minnesota between 1880 and 1910. Consists of 62 single- and multi-family residences and one church.
130	Anthony Yoerg Sr. House	Anthony Yoerg Sr. House	May 25, 1989 (#89000442)	215 Isabel St. W. 44°56′00″N 93°05′41″W	Saint Paul	1875 frame Second Empire house of a prominent Bavarian immigrant who established Minnesota's first brewery. Also notable as a rare surviving work of early Saint Paul architect Monroe Sheire.

== Former listings ==
	Name on the Register	Image	Date listed	Date removed	Location	City or town	Description
1	William Dahl House	William Dahl House	August 29, 1978 (#78001557)	April 1, 1998	508 Jefferson Ave. 44°55′50″N 93°07′17″W	Saint Paul	Built by William Dahl and his Irish wife Catherine Margaret Murphy in 1858, the home was moved from 136 13th Street in 1997.
2	S. Edward Hall House	S. Edward Hall House	April 16, 1991 (#91000440)	May 23, 2016	996 Iglehart Ave.	Saint Paul	House of S. Edward Hall (1878–1975), a longtime civic leader in Saint Paul's African American community. Demolished in 2011.
3	Selby Avenue Bridge	Selby Avenue Bridge	November 6, 1989 (#89001833)	January 10, 1994	Selby Ave. over Soo Line Railroad Tracks	Saint Paul	1890 Pratt through truss bridge.
4	Smith Avenue High Bridge	Smith Avenue High Bridge	August 6, 1981 (#81000323)	March 28, 1988	Smith Ave. over the Mississippi River	Saint Paul	2,770-foot (840 m) iron Warren truss bridge built in 1889. Demolished on February 24, 1985, due to irreparable deficiencies.
5	Wabasha Street Bridge	Wabasha Street Bridge	November 6, 1989 (#89001834)	June 22, 1998	Wabasha St. over the Mississippi River	Saint Paul	Cantilever deck truss bridge built in two phases 1890 and 1900. Dismantled in 1996 to make way for a sturdier replacement.

== See also ==
- List of National Historic Landmarks in Minnesota
- National Register of Historic Places listings in Minnesota
