= St. Matthew School =

St. Matthew School, St. Matthew's School or St. Matthew School may refer to any of very many schools, among them the following:

- Saint Matthew School (Cranston), in Cranston, Rhode Island, United States
- Saint Matthew School (Saskatoon), in Saskatoon, Canada
- Saint Matthews Episcopal Day School, in San Mateo, California
- Saint Matthew's School, in Saint Paul, Minnesota
- St. Matthews Central School, Mudgee, New South Wales
- St Matthew's Primary School, in Cambridge, England
- St Matthew's Roman Catholic High School, in Manchester, England
- St. Matthew's University, in the Cayman Islands
- St. Matthew's High School, Keiskammahoek, Eastern Cape, South Africa
