= 3M Administration Building =

Building in Saint Paul, Minnesota

- U.S. National Register of Historic Places
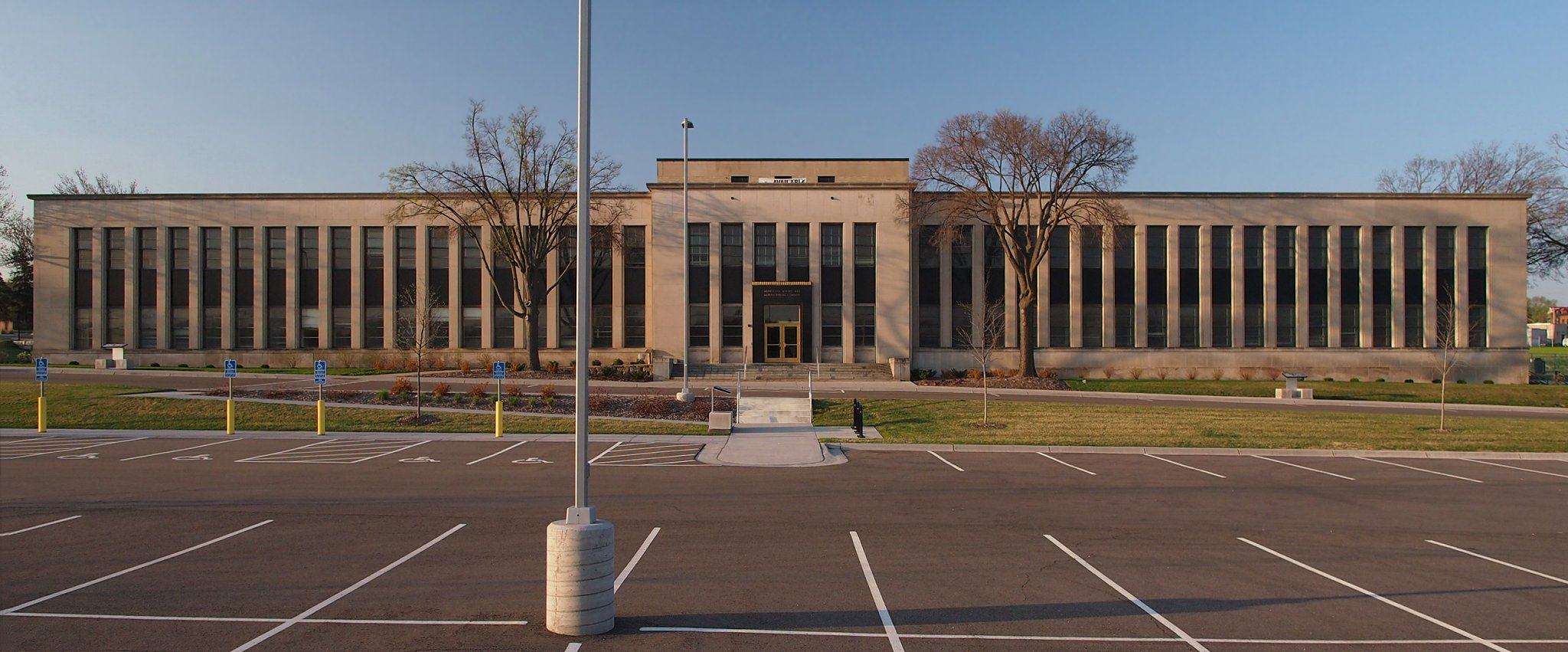
- The 3M Administration Building from the north

- Location within Minnesota Location within the United States
- Location: 777 Forest Street; Saint Paul, Minnesota
- Coordinates: 44°57′53″N 93°3′46″W
- Area: Less than one acre
- Built: 1939–1940
- Architect: Albert Kahn, Inc.; Toltz, King & Day
- Architectural style: Moderne
- NRHP reference No.: 14001212
- Added to NRHP: January 27, 2015

The 3M Administration Building was the corporate headquarters of 3M in Saint Paul, Minnesota, United States, from 1940 to 1962. It is listed on the National Register of Historic Places for its national significance in commerce, industry, and invention, and its local significance in architecture. The building reflects the corporation's success in the 1930s and continued rise to international prominence in the 1940s and 50s through its commitment to research, product development, and product diversification. The building is also a distinctive example of Moderne architecture within Saint Paul.

== See also ==
- National Register of Historic Places listings in Ramsey County, Minnesota
