= Frederick Spangenberg House =

Historic house in Minnesota, United States

- U.S. National Register of Historic Places
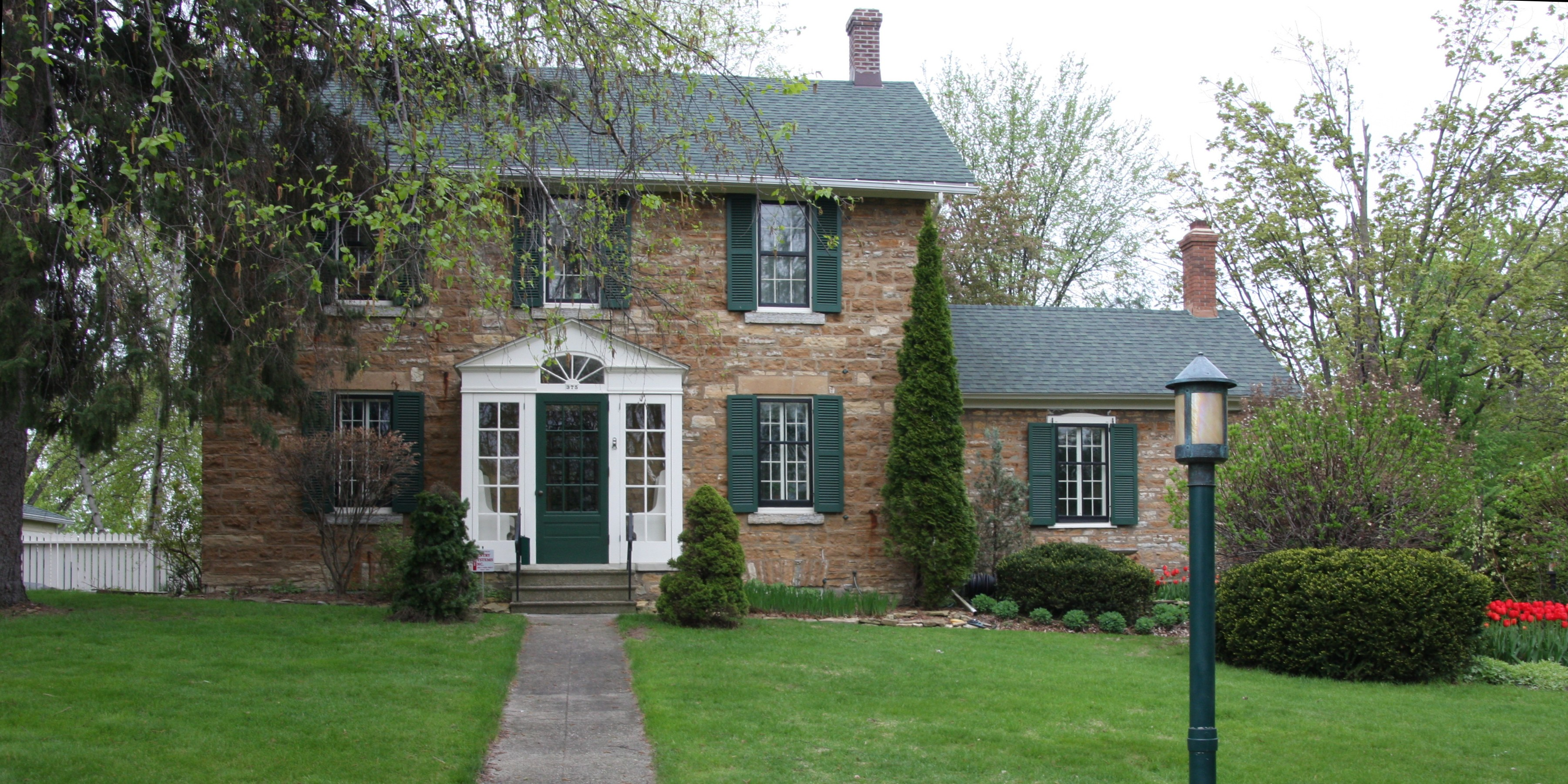
- The Frederick Spangenberg House in 2017

- Location within Minnesota Location within the United States
- Location: 375 Mount Curve Boulevard, Saint Paul, Minnesota
- Coordinates: 44°55′48.7″N 93°11′38.8″W
- Area: Less than one acre
- Built: 1864–67
- Built by: Frederick Spangenberg
- Architectural style: Federal
- NRHP reference No.: 76001068
- Designated: June 22, 1976

The Frederick Spangenberg House is a historic house in Saint Paul, Minnesota, United States. It was built from 1864 to 1867 as the residence of a farm in what was then rural land outside the urban center. The house was listed on the National Register of Historic Places in 1976 for its architectural significance. Now in a residential neighborhood, it was nominated as one of the oldest limestone farmhouses preserved in Saint Paul.

== History ==
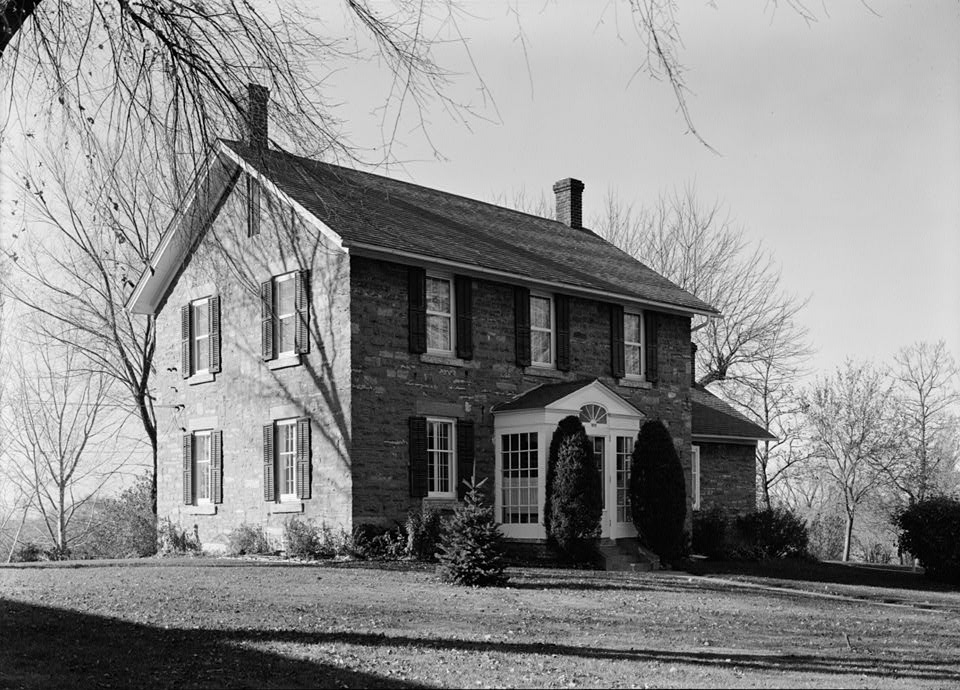
The house in 1960

Frederick Spangenberg was a German immigrant who built a prosperous dairy farm and milk-distribution business. He also designed this house for himself and his wife, Anna. Its yellow limestone walls came from banks of the Mississippi River and were hauled by stone-boat over snow to the building site. When the house was under construction, the Spangenbergs lived in a log cabin on one end of the property, near where Jefferson and Cretin avenues intersect today. When completed in 1867, the house was surrounded by an 80-acre (32 ha) dairy farm, well outside the Saint Paul city limits.

Today the house is surrounded not by fields and barns but by the paved streets and ample houses of the Macalester–Groveland neighborhood. Sited on a wooded lot, the house at 375 Mount Curve Boulevard—a two-story Greek Revival with two-foot-thick (0.6 m), random coursed walls—is somewhat obscured from the street by tall hedges. A one-story appendage originally served as a kitchen but was converted into a sitting room in 1932 by two of the Spangenbergs' sons, who lived in the house after their parents' deaths. The sons also transformed the first-floor bedroom into a kitchen, the parlor into a dining room, and one of the four upstairs bedrooms into a bathroom.

In 1954 the Spangenbergs' youngest granddaughter, Gertrude M. Yates, and her husband moved in and updated the interior while preserving its historic integrity. Then almost a century old, the house still contained a wine cellar complete with wooden casks and wine press, paddles and crocks for butter- and cheesemaking, and a cabbage cutter used for large-scale production of sauerkraut—a source of vitamins in the winter. The Yates family lived in the house until 1972, marking the end of the Spangenberg era. It was listed on the National Register of Historic Places in 1976.

== See also ==
- National Register of Historic Places listings in Ramsey County, Minnesota
