= First National Bank of White Bear =

- U.S. National Register of Historic Places
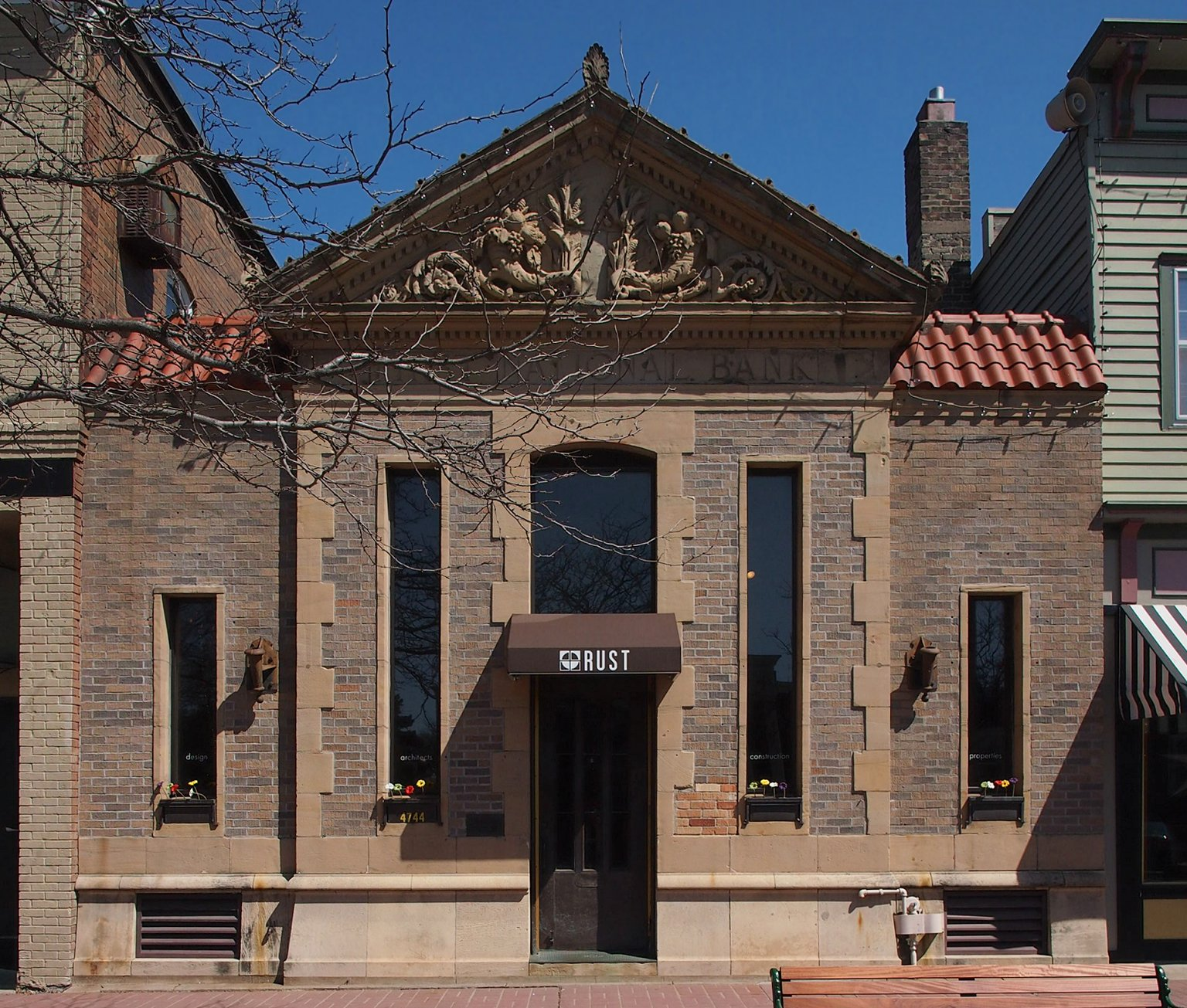
- First National Bank of White Bear from the west

- Location within Minnesota Location within the United States
- Location: 4744 Washington Avenue; White Bear Lake, Minnesota
- Coordinates: 45°5′5″N 93°0′32″W
- Area: Less than one acre
- Built: 1921
- Built by: Steenberg Construction Company
- Architect: Clark E. Van Kirk
- Architectural style: Neoclassical
- NRHP reference No.: 83000930
- Added to NRHP: February 24, 1983

The First National Bank of White Bear is a historic former bank building in White Bear Lake, Minnesota, United States, built in 1921. It is listed on the National Register of Historic Places for having local significance in architecture and commerce. It is one of White Bear Lake's most architecturally sophisticated commercial buildings constructed before the 1940s. It also served a key financial role as White Bear Lake evolved from a resort town of summer homes for nearby Saint Paul into a full-fledged city with year-round residents.

== Description ==
The First National Bank of White Bear is a fairly small building with a 28-foot-wide (8.5 m) façade squeezed between adjacent commercial buildings. Its style is generally Neoclassical, but with an unusual Spanish tile eave.

== History ==
Established in 1913 as the White Bear State Bank, it quickly outgrew its original frame building, and the current building was constructed on the same site in 1921. That same year it received its national bank charter and changed its name to the First National Bank of White Bear. Like most banks it was hit hard by the onset of the Great Depression, and it closed on March 6, 1933. Its surviving competitor the First State Bank of White Bear soon moved into the building and occupied it until 1961. It served as a professional office building until 1980, when a clothing store moved in. Its current tenant is an architectural firm.

== See also ==
- National Register of Historic Places listings in Ramsey County, Minnesota
