= Triune Masonic Temple =

- The Historic Triune Masonic Temple
- U.S. National Register of Historic Places
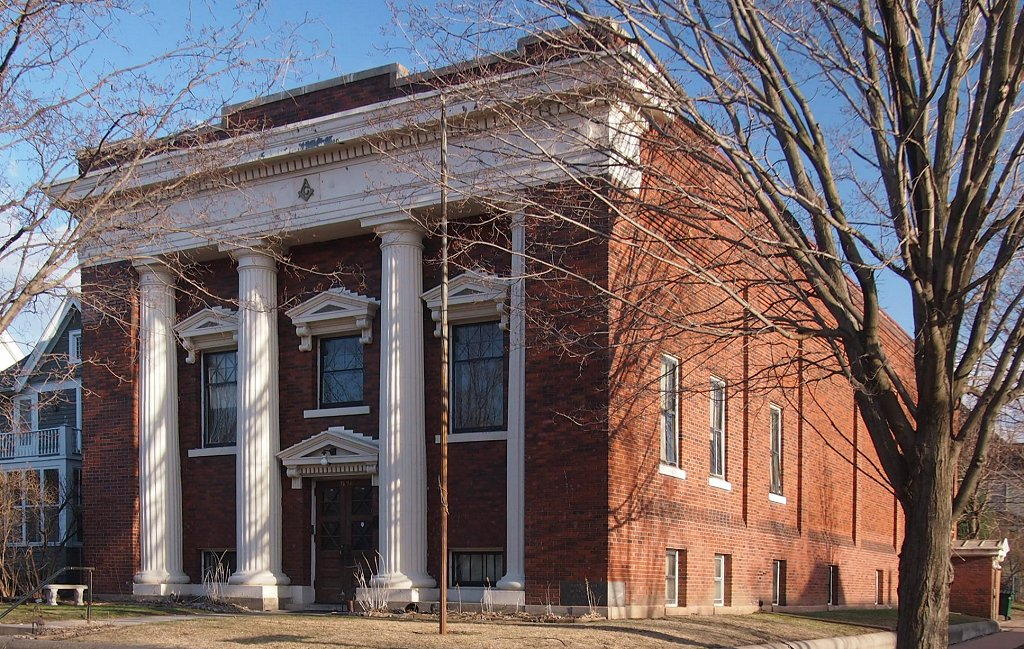
- The Historic Triune Masonic Temple from the northwest

- Location within Minnesota Location within the United States
- Location: 1898 Iglehart Avenue; Saint Paul, Minnesota
- Coordinates: 44°56′57″N 93°10′50″W
- Built: 1910
- Architect: H.C. Struchen; Victor Ingemann
- Architectural style: Classical Revival
- NRHP reference No.: 80002127
- Added to NRHP: November 13, 1980

The Historic Triune Masonic Temple is a meetinghouse of Freemasonry in Saint Paul, Minnesota, United States, built in 1910 in the Neo-Classical Revival style, designed by Henry C. Struchen (1871–1947). The structure was built for Triune Lodge No. 190, AF & AM. It is one of the earliest and best preserved buildings erected exclusively for the use of a single Masonic Lodge. Henry Struchen, although not an architect, was a contractor and designer. He was a member of Triune Lodge and a prominent builder in the city.

Opening ceremonies for the building were held Thursday, March 2, 1911. Triune Masonic Temple was recognized for its historic and architectural significance by being placed on the National Register of Historic Places on November 13, 1980.

Stylistically the temple is a good example of the Neo-Classical Revival of the opening decades of the twentieth century. The exterior is virtually unchanged while the interior retains its classic integrity and remains substantially intact. The front facade features four Doric columns, pedimented windows and a decorative cornice, while the lodge room itself is adorned with stately pillars representing the five classical orders of architecture. The front of the building gives a hint of the grandeur inside. The interior cherry and maple woodwork and many of the original furnishings remain. The building is notable because it incorporates elements of Masonic ritual into its architectural design.

The Historic Triune Masonic Temple is the last remaining historic Masonic temple within the cities of Saint Paul and Minneapolis. The Temple is the home of Saint Paul Lodge Number Three A. F. & A. M. of Minnesota. Located in the Merriam Park neighborhood in Saint Paul MN, The Historic Triune Masonic Temple is a community fixture available for both private and public functions.

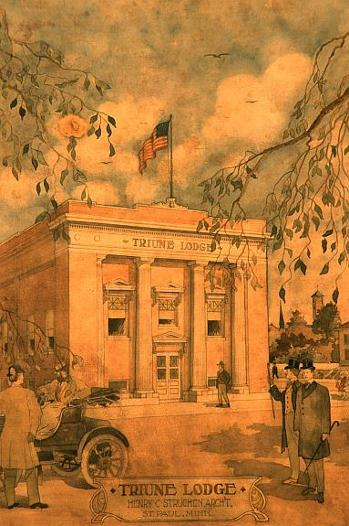
Architect's 1909 drawing

== See also ==
- List of Masonic buildings in the United States
- National Register of Historic Places listings in Ramsey County, Minnesota
