= Euclid View Flats =

- U.S. National Register of Historic Places
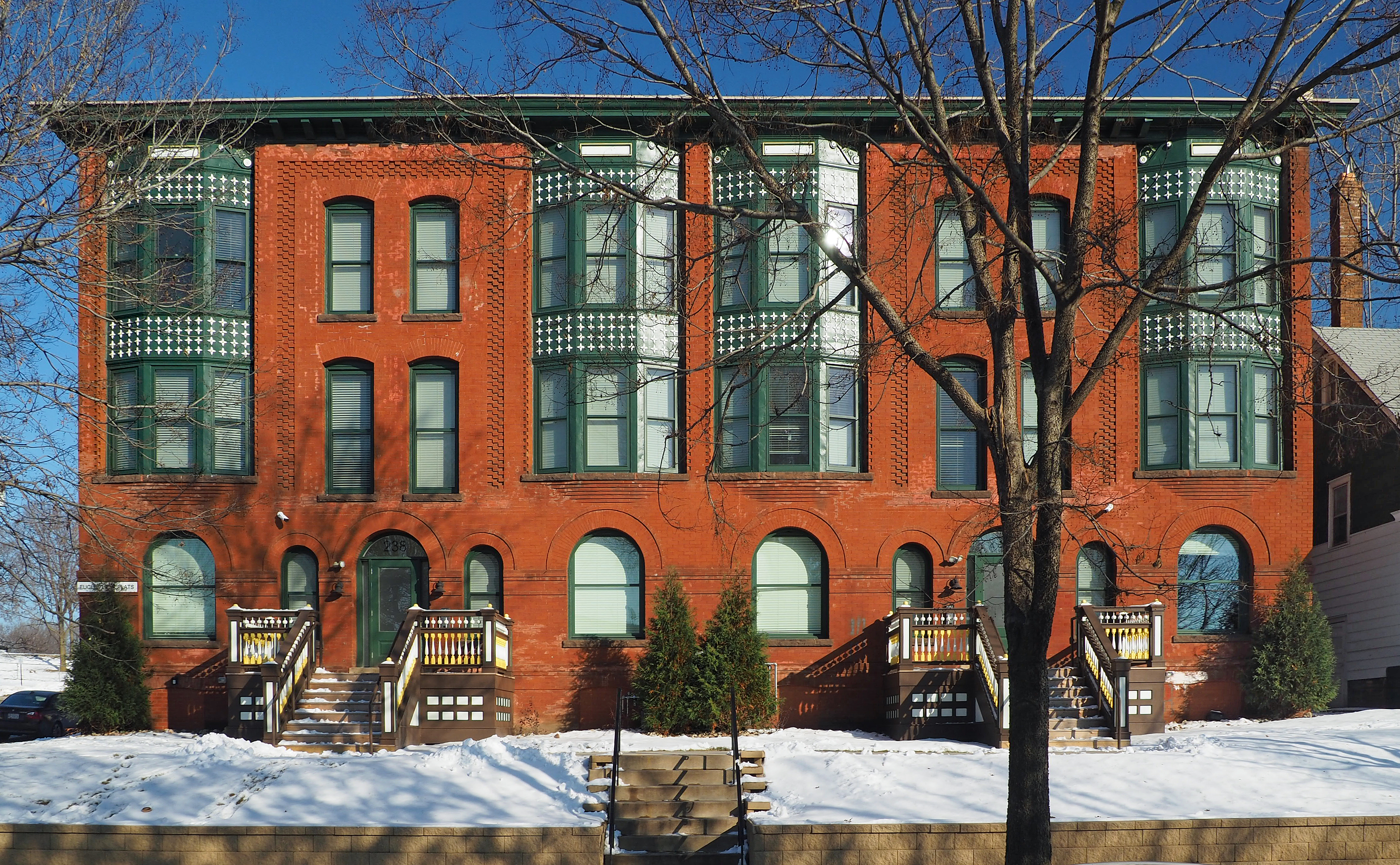
- Euclid View Flats from the southwest

- Location within Minnesota Location within the United States
- Location: 234–238 Bates Avenue; Saint Paul, Minnesota
- Coordinates: 44°57′13.8″N 93°3′58.7″W
- Area: .21 acres (0.085 ha)
- Built: 1894–95
- Architect: Herman Kretz
- Architectural style: Queen Anne/Romanesque Revival
- NRHP reference No.: 13001170
- Added to NRHP: February 10, 2014

Euclid View Flats is a historic apartment building in Saint Paul, Minnesota, United States, constructed 1894–1895. It is listed on the National Register of Historic Places for its local significance in architecture. Euclid View Flats is a sophisticated early example of an apartment building designed to attract the middle class. Prior to the 1890s, multi-family housing in the United States was overwhelmingly in the form of tenements catering to the poor. Euclid View Flats provided an acceptable alternative to the single-family houses that dominated middle-class residential options in Saint Paul and the Dayton's Bluff neighborhood in particular. In addition to representing a change in housing preferences, the building reveals in its transitional architecture a shift from the highly ornamented Queen Anne style to the more restrained Romanesque Revival style during the same period.

Euclid View Flats is currently being rehabilitated, with plans to offer all 12 units as affordable housing. The building had fallen into some disrepair and was then vacant beginning in 2010.

== See also ==
- National Register of Historic Places listings in Ramsey County, Minnesota
