= Rau/Strong House =

Historic house in Minnesota, United States

- U.S. National Register of Historic Places
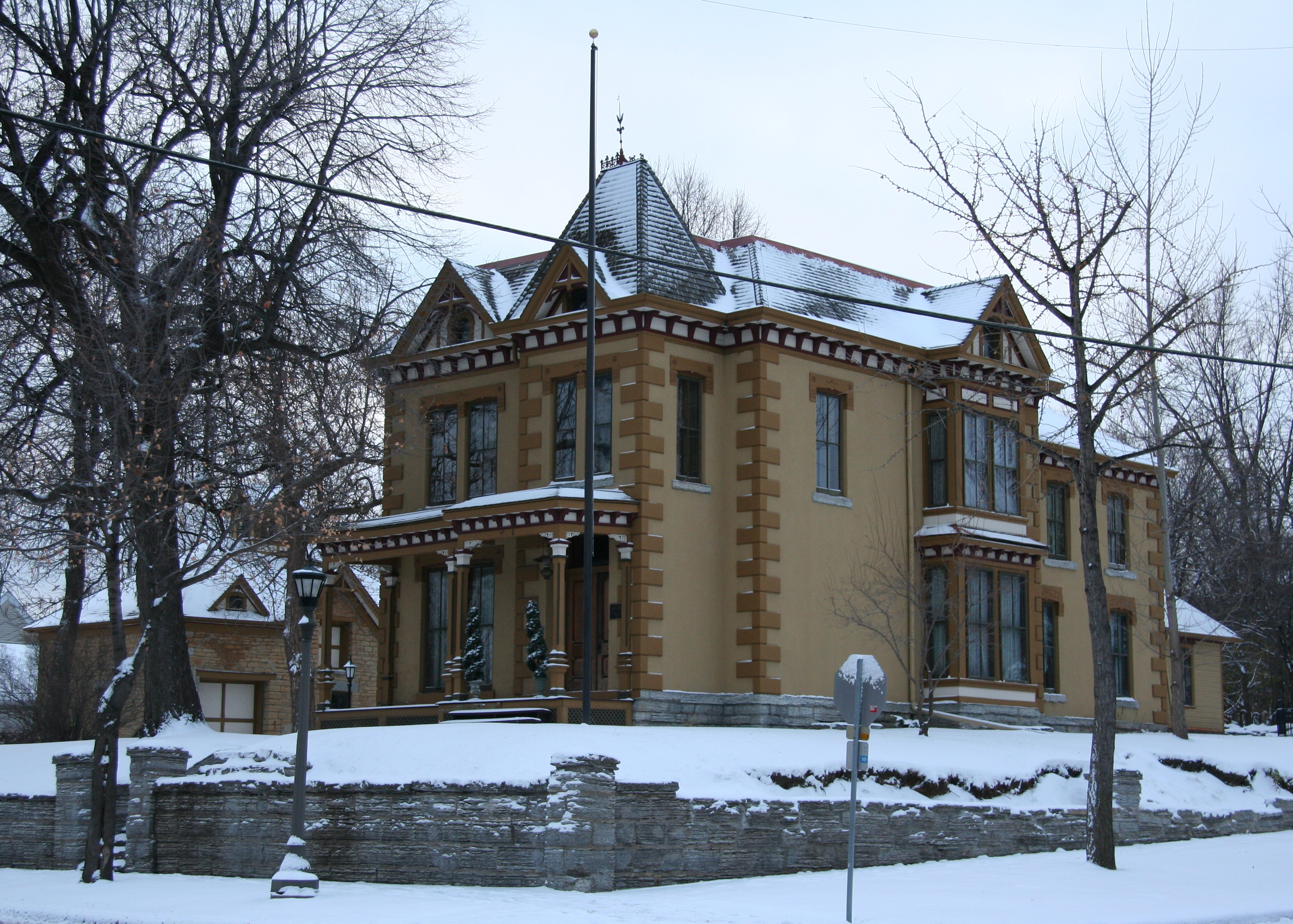
- The Rau/Strong House from the northwest

- Location within Minnesota Location within the United States
- Location: 2 George Street, Saint Paul, Minnesota
- Coordinates: 44°55′46″N 93°5′6″W
- Built: 1884–86
- Architectural style: Italianate/Second Empire/Eastlake movement
- NRHP reference No.: 75001015
- Added to NRHP: June 18, 1975

The Rau/Strong House is a historic house and accompanying carriage barn in Saint Paul, Minnesota, United States. It is located in Saint Paul's West Side neighborhood. It was built 1884–86, with an eclectic Italianate/Second Empire/Eastlake movement design featuring a mansard roof and hammered quoin blocks. The Rau/Strong House was listed on the National Register of Historic Places in 1975 for its architectural significance as a finely crafted "urban estate" representative of Saint Paul's late-19th-century middle class residences.

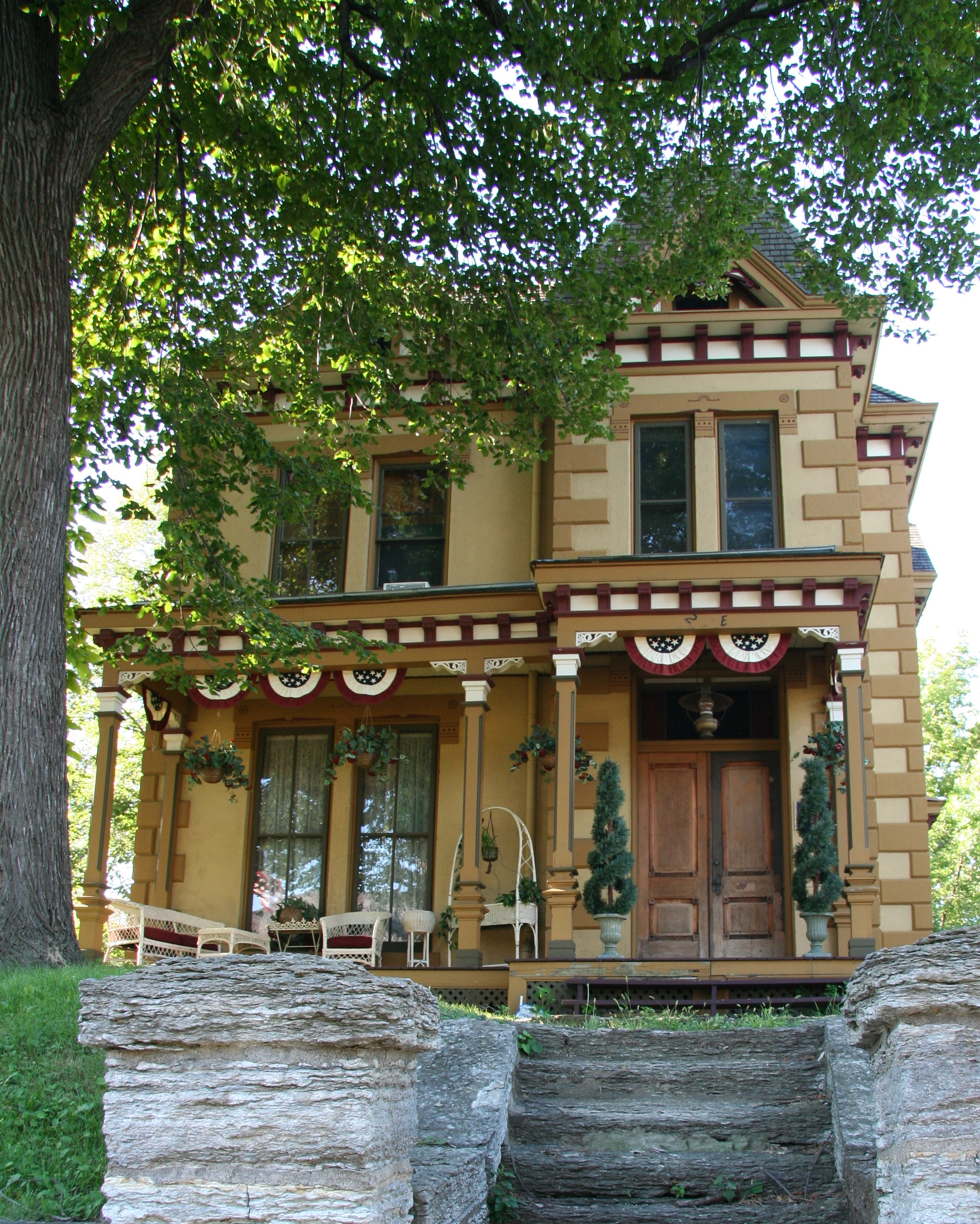
The front façade of the Rau/Strong House
