= Riverside Hangar =

Historic hangar in Saint Paul, Minnesota

- U.S. National Register of Historic Places
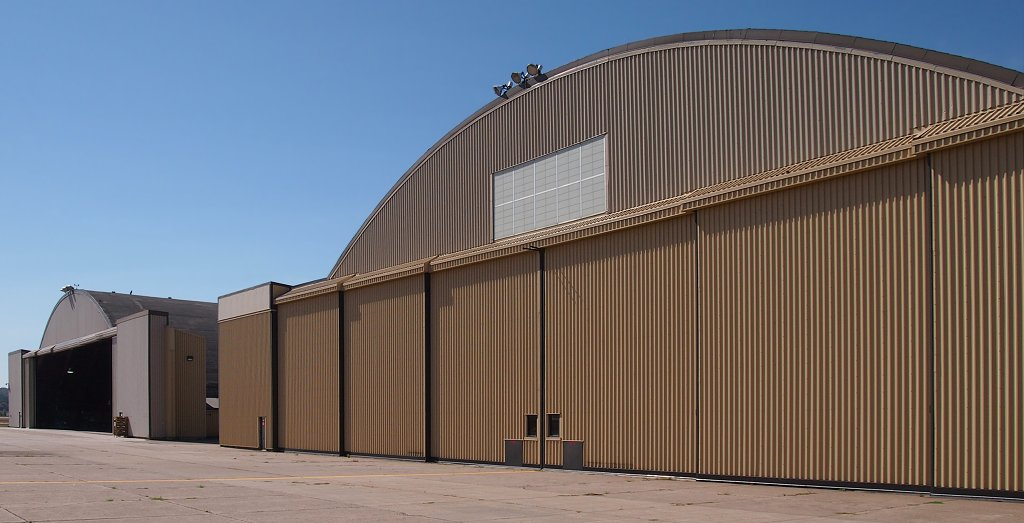
- The Riverside Hangar viewed from the east

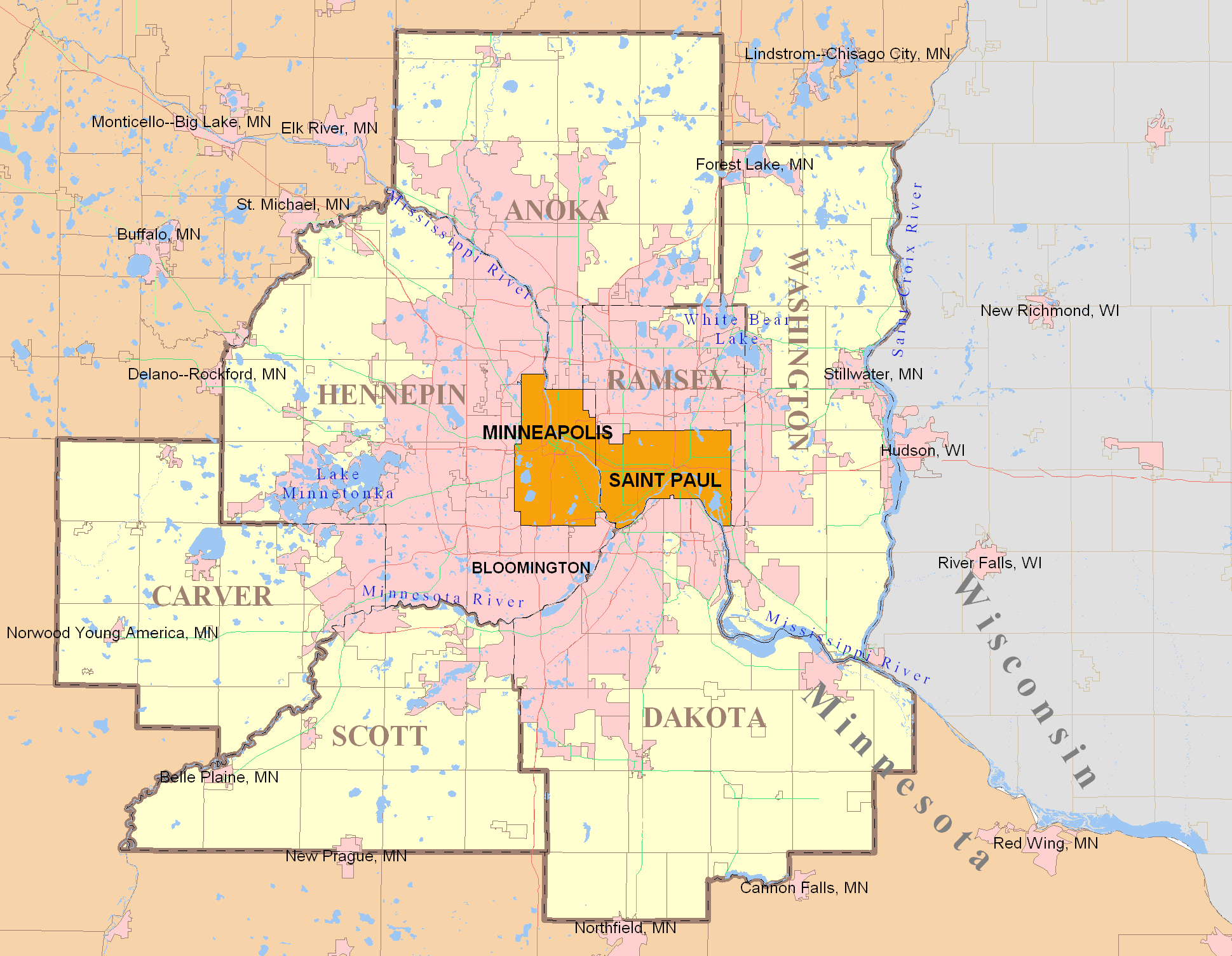
- Location within Minneapolis–Saint Paul Location within Minnesota Location within the United States
- Location: Building 690-01-01, 690 Bayfield Street, Saint Paul, Minnesota
- Coordinates: 44°56′29″N 93°3′40″W
- Area: 6.25 acres (2.53 ha)
- Built: 1942
- Architect: Unit Structures & Rilco, Inc.
- Architectural style: Laminated wood arch
- NRHP reference No.: 07001315
- Added to NRHP: December 27, 2007

The Riverside Hangar is a historic hangar complex at the St. Paul Downtown Airport in Saint Paul, Minnesota, United States. It comprises two parallel hangars with a connecting structure and some additions. Built on the bank of the Mississippi River in 1942, it was part of a bomber modification center that operated at the airport during World War II. The two hangar buildings were constructed with glued laminated timber arches, an innovation born of wartime steel shortages. Half the arches were manufactured in Peshtigo, WI by Unit Structures, Inc. and half by Rilco Laminated Products, Inc. at Albert Lea, MN. Their important design features were their low cost and that they were erectable quickly by unskilled workers. Riverside Hangar was listed on the National Register of Historic Places for its state-level significance in the theme of engineering. It was nominated for being one of Minnesota's leading examples of glued laminated timber construction.

== Description ==
The two parallel hangars are both 600 feet (180 m) long, 168 feet (51 m) wide, and 50 feet (15 m) high. They are 74 feet (23 m) apart, with a wooden structure between them.

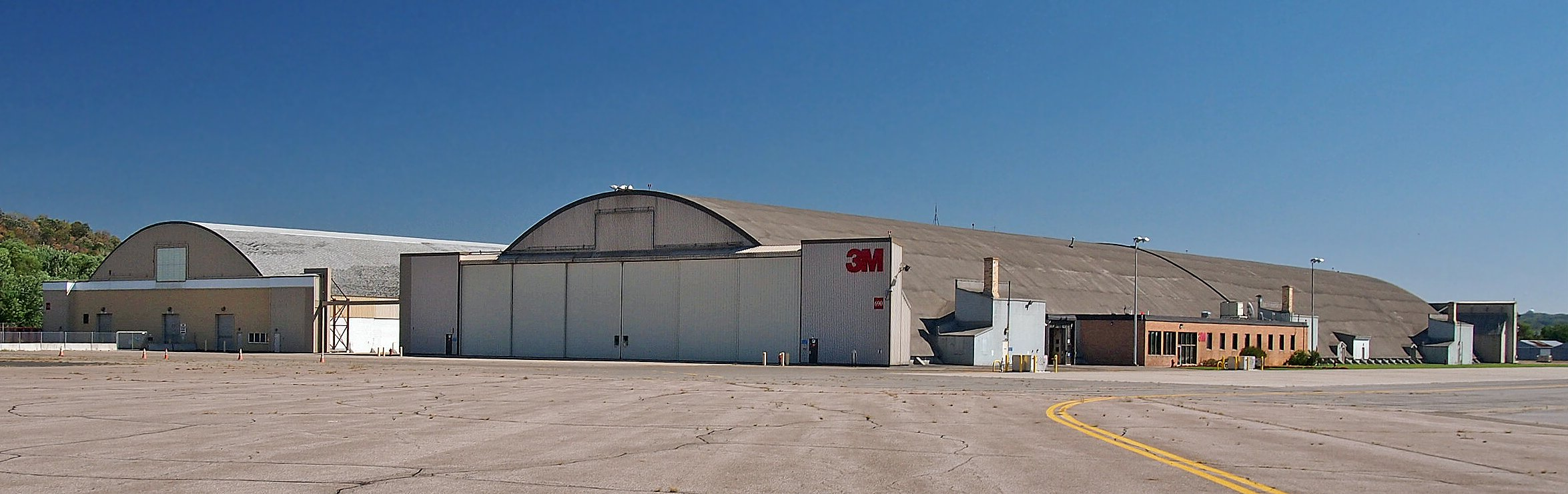
Riverside Hangar viewed from the west

== See also ==
- National Register of Historic Places listings in Ramsey County, Minnesota
