= William and Catherine Davern Farm House =

Historic house in Minnesota, United States

- U.S. National Register of Historic Places
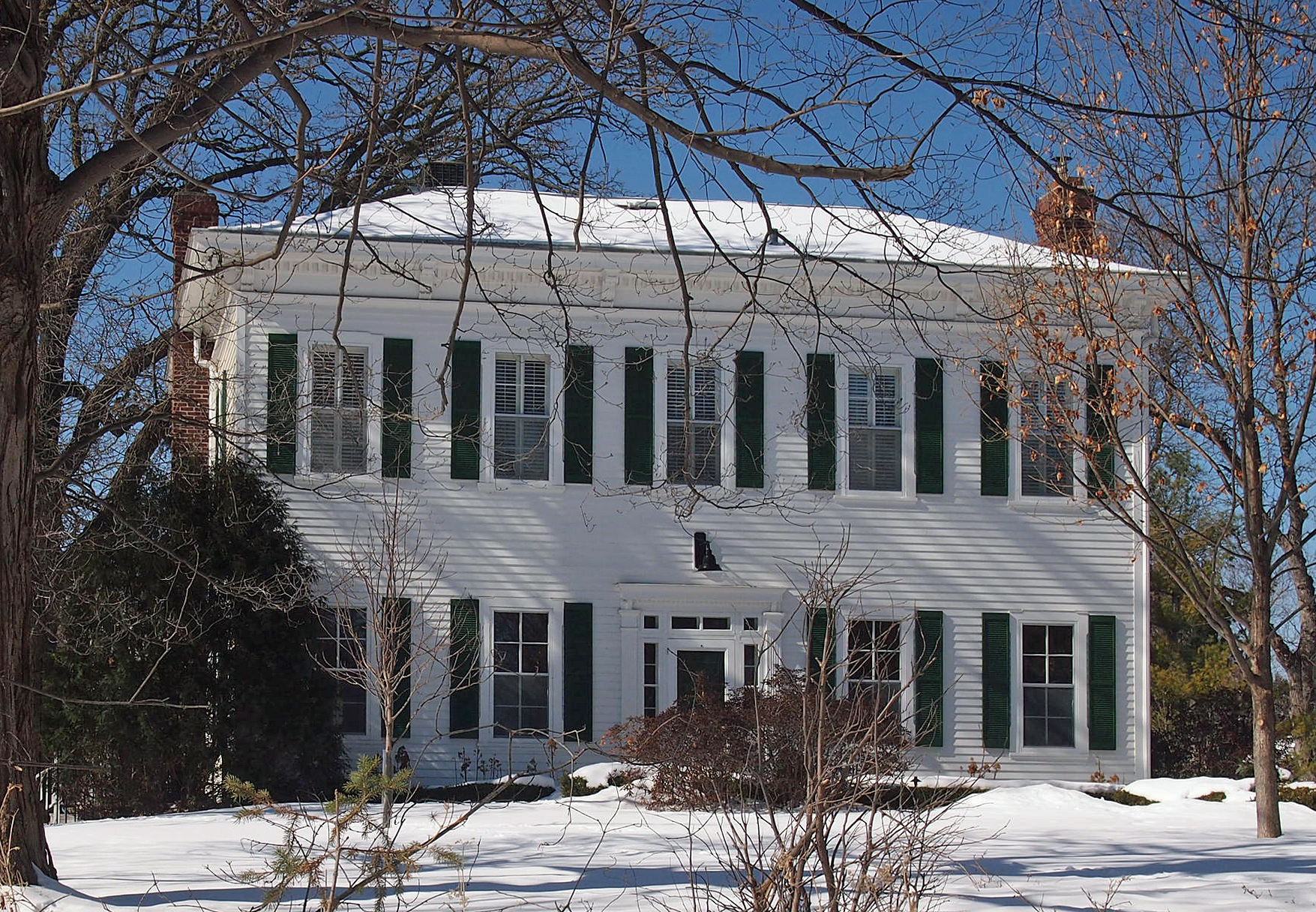
- The Davern Farm House from the east-southeast

- Location within Minnesota Location within the United States
- Location: 1173 Davern Street South, Saint Paul, Minnesota
- Coordinates: 44°54′22.3″N 93°10′22″W
- Built: 1862
- Architectural style: Italianate
- NRHP reference No.: 83003765
- Added to NRHP: October 6, 1983

The William and Catherine Davern Farm House is an Italianate farmhouse built in 1862 in Saint Paul, Minnesota, United States. It is one of a small number of surviving farmhouses in Saint Paul. William Davern was a member of the first territorial legislature. The house is listed on the National Register of Historic Places.
