= St. Paul Casket Company =

- U.S. National Register of Historic Places
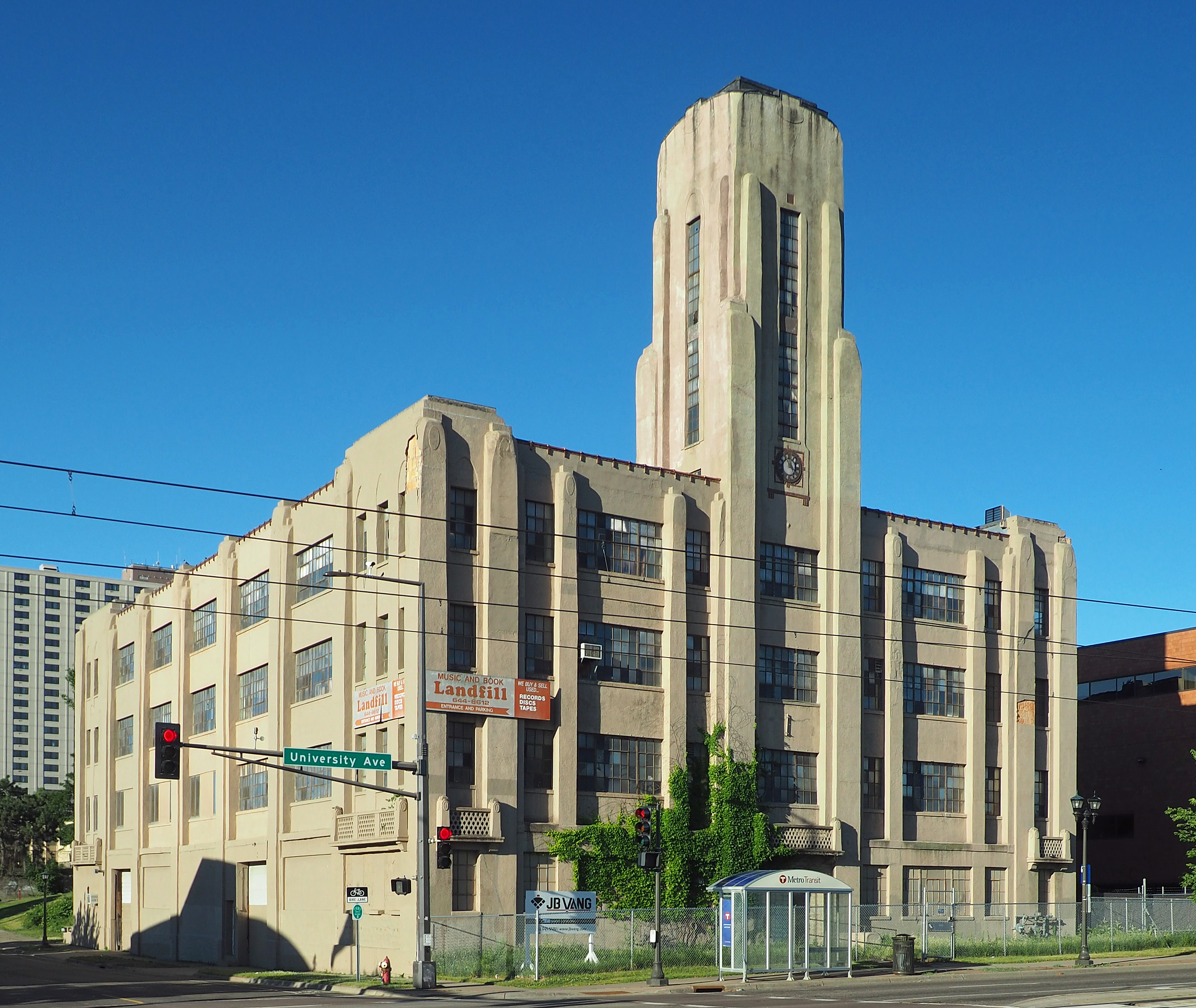

- Location within Minnesota
- Location: 1222 West University Ave., St. Paul, Minnesota
- Coordinates: 44.9553°N 93.152°W
- Area: 0.44 acres (0.18 ha)
- Architect: Allen H. Stem, Roy H. Haslund
- NRHP reference No.: 100006372
- Added to NRHP: April 12, 2021

The St. Paul Casket Company Building was the location of the most important casket manufacturer in St. Paul, Minnesota and one of the most important casket manufacturers in Minnesota. The building was listed on the National Register of Historic Places in 2021 for its significance in local history, as well as for its architecture.

The firm was established in 1887 in North St. Paul, Minnesota as the North St. Paul Casket Company. The factory was located along the Wisconsin Central railroad (later Soo Line Railroad). Under the leadership of Ernest C. Reiff and Uriah Meeker Stone, the company quickly became one of the leading manufacturers of coffins and caskets in Minnesota. This was occurring during a time when coffin manufacturing was shifting from local carpenters and cabinetmakers to factories, and when their distribution was shifting to professional undertakers and funeral directors. Advances in embalming, communication, and transportation also made it possible to order a casket from a catalog and have it delivered in time for a funeral. Casket manufacturers marketed to funeral directors, and funeral directors were encouraged to buy products and seek guidance from casket manufacturers, in a symbiotic relationship. Funeral directors could specify trimmings such as handles, name plates, linings, and burial garments, and the manufacturer would add those features before shipping the casket.

In 1913, a guide entitled Wood Using Industries of Minnesota was published, and it named seven manufacturers as major users of wood. The North St. Paul Casket Company was among them, along with their nearest competitor, the Northwestern Casket Company of Minneapolis. The guide noted that large factories in certain cities were supplying surrounding states. Around 1918, the North St. Paul factory had become insufficient for the volume of business the firm was doing, which included the states of Minnesota, Wisconsin, Iowa, North Dakota, South Dakota, and Montana. The company looked at several possible sites for the new factory, settling on 1222 University Avenue in St. Paul. The new location was easily accessible by rail, streetcar, bus, and road, and the company felt this was key to the company's growth and success. Rail access was furnished by the Milwaukee Road and the Minnesota Transfer Railway. Some of the company's neighbors included the Montgomery Ward store and warehouse, a Minnesota Highway Department warehouse, and the printing plant and warehouse of Brown and Bigelow.

Plans for the new factory were announced in August 1922, with four stories of brick, tile, and concrete, measuring 95 feet (29 m) by 150 feet (46 m). Construction began in September 1922, and the building was opened for business in June of 1923. The North St. Paul Casket Company changed its name to the St. Paul Casket Company and advertised that it sold "wholesale funeral supplies." The building contained at least twice the floor space of its old North St. Paul factory. The plan was similar to other vertical urban factory designs that were built at the time, where production flowed from the top floors to the bottom, the construction was fireproof, and there were large steel-sash windows and skylights. Fire protection was developed with an automatic sprinkler system fed by a rooftop water tank, concealed in a dramatic tower.

The St. Paul Casket Company operated out of this building until 1951. Later tenants included the Snyder Drug Store corporation, who used it as their general office and warehouse from 1952 through 1962; Dimensional Display and Design in the 1970s; and Landfill Music and Books at the time of the National Register nomination. It was then acquired by JB Vang, which used federal and state historic tax credits, low income housing tax credits, and tax exempt bonds to convert the building into affordable housing. Fifty-five units were planned, and not much major restoration was required due to the solid reinforced concrete construction. The large factory windows allowed plenty of light in apartments, and the building has proximity to the Lexington station of the Metro Green Line (Minnesota) and Allianz Field. Fifteen units are considered affordable for people earning 30% of the area's median income, with rents from $665 to $785 per month. Forty units are affordable for people earning 60% of the area median income, with rents from $1365 to $1624 per month.
