= Adolf Muench House =

Historic house in Minnesota, United States

- Adolf Muench House, "the Manor"
- U.S. National Register of Historic Places
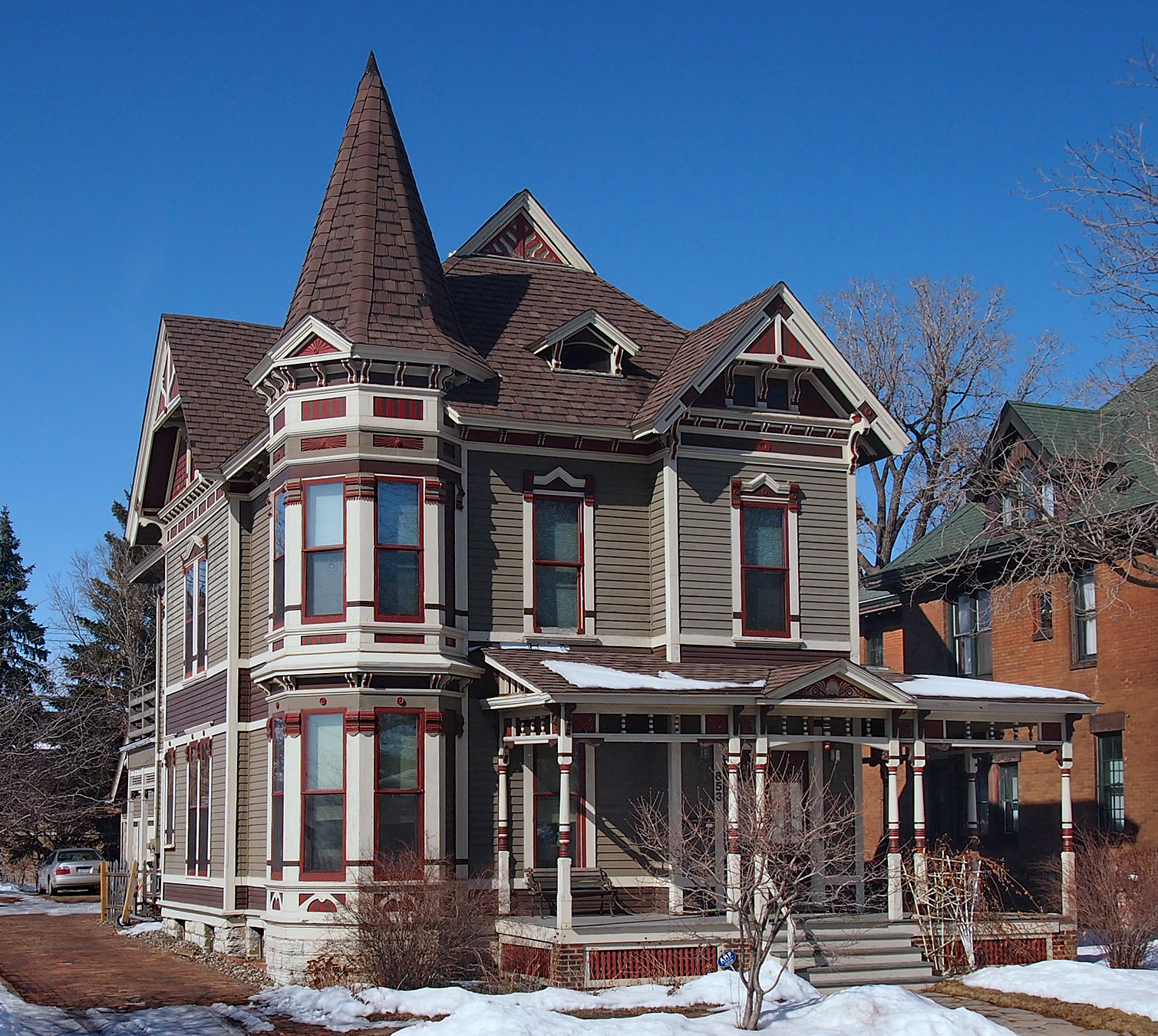
- The Adolf Muench House viewed from the south

- Location within Minnesota Location within the United States
- Location: 653 5th Street East; Saint Paul, Minnesota
- Coordinates: 44°57′21″N 93°4′23″W
- Built: 1885
- Architect: Emil W. Ulrici
- Architectural style: Queen Anne
- NRHP reference No.: 75001012
- Added to NRHP: May 12, 1975

The Adolf Muench House is listed on the National Register of Historic Places in Saint Paul, Minnesota, United States. The 1884 house designed by Emil W. Ulrici overlooks Saint Paul from the bluffs east of downtown.

== History ==
Germans were one of the earliest immigrant groups that came to Saint Paul. As many of them became prosperous, they moved into Dayton's Bluff and built substantial homes for their families. Several, including the home of Adolph and Anna Muench, were set at the edge of the bluff to take advantage of the descending landscape that allowed for a view of Phalen Creek and the Mississippi River. The Muenches began residing at this address in 1873, in an earlier house that burned down in 1884. The current structure, was built the same year at a cost of $10,000 and had the nickname of, "the Manor".

Local architect Emi Ulrici designed the new house that was completed at 653 East Fifth Street. Ulrici, a German-American, who built almost exclusively for his prosperous fellow immigrants that were scattered throughout Saint Paul in the 1880s. This Queen Anne style with asymmetrical towers gables and balconies with a traditional tower is considered the finest of his surviving residential commissions.

Adolph was a prominent member of the German American community. He was in the lumber business until becoming publisher of the Volkszeitung, a German-language daily newspaper. Anna died in 1896 and, when Adolph died in 1901, the house was offered for sale. After staying empty for two years, it was converted into duplex and was rental property for several decades.

The house was added to the National Register of Historic Places in 1977 and was owner occupied until 2017.
