= Andrew R. McGill House =

Historic house in Minnesota, United States

- U.S. National Register of Historic Places
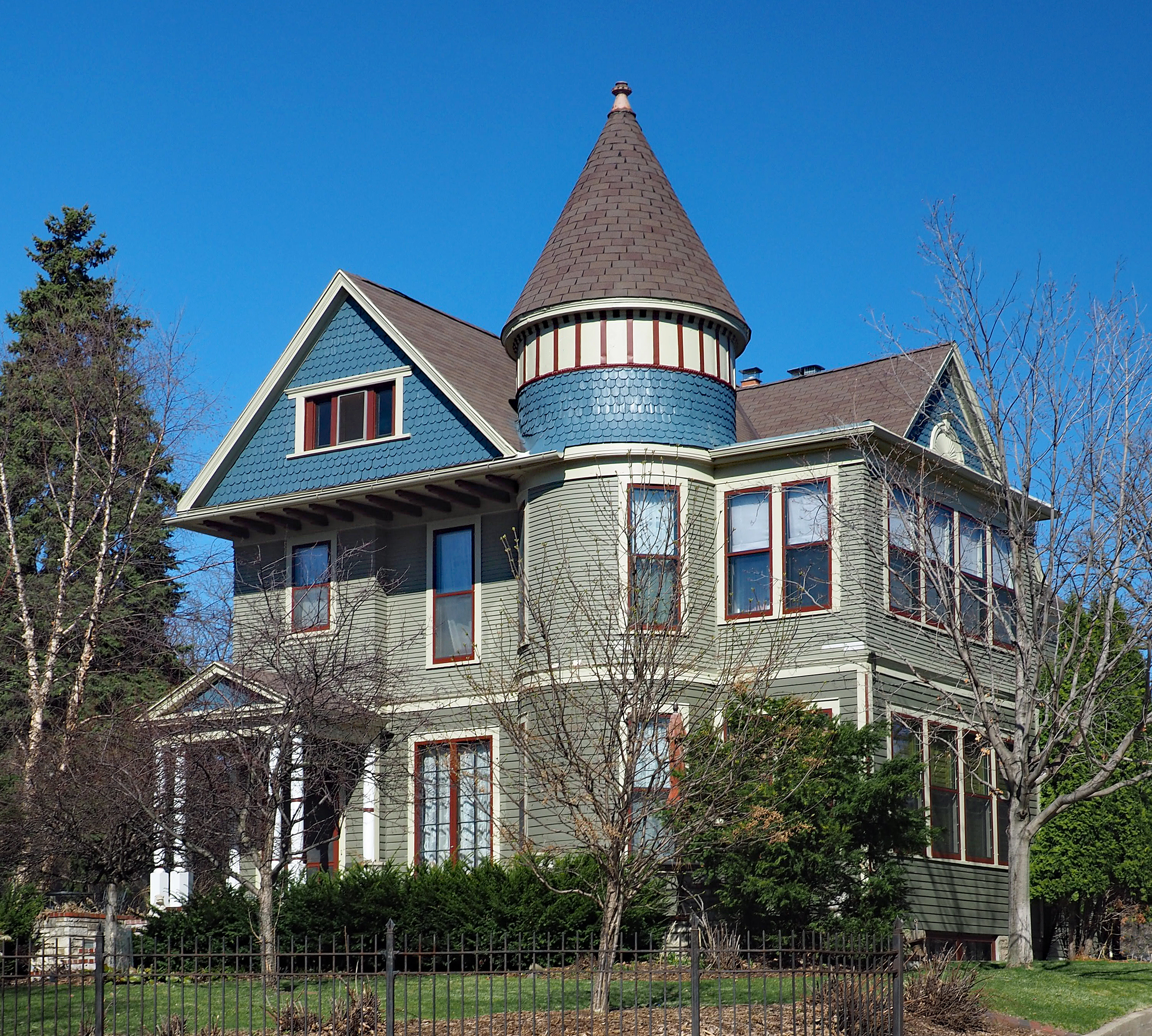
- The Andrew R. McGill House from the southeast

- Location within Minnesota Location within the United States
- Location: 2203 Scudder Ave., Saint Paul, Minnesota
- Coordinates: 44°58′38″N 93°11′31″W
- Area: less than one acre
- Built: 1888
- Architect: W. A. Hunt
- Architectural style: Queen Anne
- NRHP reference No.: 74001037
- Added to NRHP: December 31, 1974

The Andrew R. McGill House is a historic house in Saint Paul, Minnesota, United States.

== Description and history ==
It is the Queen Anne style home of Governor Andrew Ryan McGill (served 1887–1889); designed in 1888 by W. A. Hunt. Andrew R. McGill, the son of Angeline (née Martin) and Charles McGill, was born in Saegertown, Pennsylvania, on February 19, 1840. Andrew R. McGill served as a Nicollet County and St. Paul lawyer (1861–1869); private secretary to Governor Horace Austin (1870–1874); Minnesota insurance commissioner (1873–1887); governor (1887–1889); state senator (1899–1905); and St. Paul postmaster (1900–1905).

It was listed on the National Register of Historic Places on December 31, 1974.
