= O'Donnell Shoe Company Building =

- U.S. National Register of Historic Places
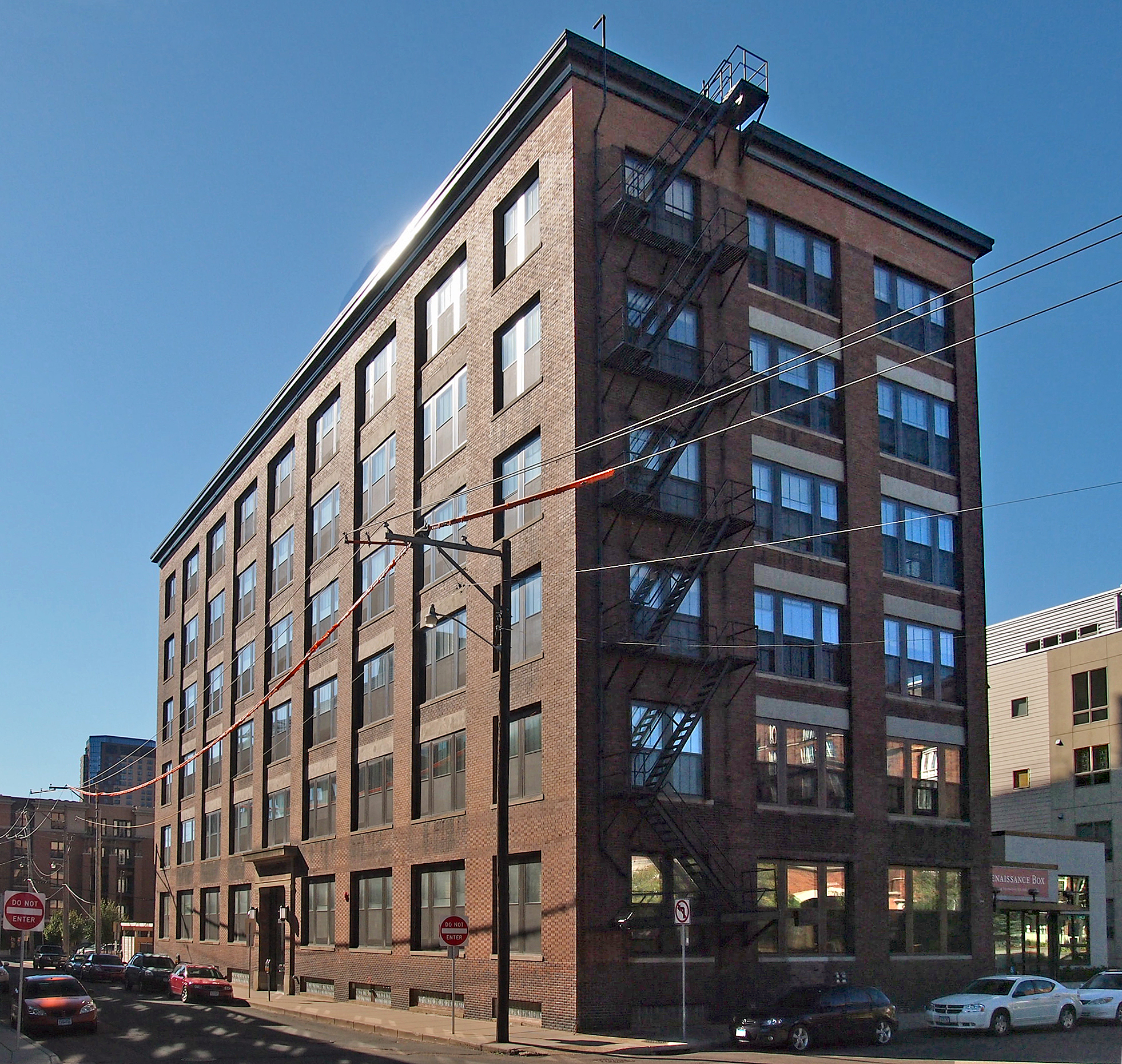

- Location within Minnesota
- Location: 509 Sibley St., St. Paul, Minnesota
- Coordinates: 44.952338°N 93.091568°W
- Area: less than one acre
- Built: 1914
- Architect: Butler Bros.
- Architectural style: Early Commercial
- NRHP reference No.: 09000623
- Added to NRHP: August 20, 2009

The O'Donnell Shoe Company Building is a former shoe factory in downtown St. Paul, Minnesota. It was listed on the National Register of Historic Places in 2009 for its significance, at the local level, in the area of industry. It was built in 1914 at a cost of $65,000, and has a frontage of 150 feet (46 m) on Sibley Street and 50 feet (15 m) on East Tenth Street.

During the 1880s, the shoe industry in St. Paul was growing rapidly. In 1888, shoe manufacturing contributed $1,400,000 to the local economy, making them one of the city's top manufactured products. The Lowertown area became the wholesale and manufacturing center of Minnesota during this time. Leather was readily available from the stockyards in South St. Paul. By 1908, the shoe industry contributed between $6,500,000 and $7,000,000 to the local economy.

William O'Donnell was raised by Irish immigrant farmers in Le Sueur, Minnesota and moved to St. Paul in 1879. He began work at C. Gotzian and Company in 1890, eventually becoming the manager of its subsidiary, the Minnesota Shoe Company, in 1903. O'Donnell resigned from the Gotzian firm in 1909 and incorporated his own firm with 400 employees and $100,000 in capital. The O'Donnell Shoe Company first rented quarters at 237 East Sixth Street, but in 1910 moved to a building at 510 Sibley Street. In 1914, they built a second factory directly across Sibley Street. The factory performed leather cutting on the top floor, cutting and sewing on the fifth floor, trimming and soling on the third and fourth floors, and finishing on the second floor. The basement and the first floor were used for packaging, offices, and storing finished stock. By 1928, the O'Donnell Shoe Company was the largest shoe manufacturer in Minnesota.

Labor relations were initially good, with few strikes, but the shoe industry started declining by the 1920s. The stock market crash of 1929 brought many closings of shoe factories, and southern states were offering incentives to manufacturers. The Minneapolis general strike of 1934 was devastating to the region, so the O'Donnell Shoe Company moved to Humboldt, Tennessee in 1935. The building at 510 Sibley was used by the National Youth Administration from 1941 to 1944, then was used by the McGill-Warner company. That building was demolished in the 1990s. The factory at 509 Sibley was leased to the Market Seed Company and Albert Wholesale Produce, then later was used by St. Paul's branch of Goodwill Industries from the 1940s through the 1970s. In 1999, it was known as the Renaissance Box, housing a theater group and other arts, educational, non-profit, and retail functions. At the time of the nomination in 2009, Aeon was planning to remodel the building for affordable housing.

Aeon slated the building for 70 affordable housing units for downtown St. Paul workers with jobs at restaurants, hospitals, or other service industries. They planned 56 units, with a mix of one- and two-bedroom apartments, for moderate income earners and 14 more units for low income earners who had been homeless. The project benefited from a Minnesota Historic Tax Credit, which is meant for buildings that are on the National Register, that have qualified for federal historic tax credits, and that produce income, typically through housing rentals. The O'Donnell Shoe Company project received $2.15 million in credits.
