= Saint Agatha's Conservatory of Music and Arts =

- St. Agatha's Conservatory of Music and Arts
- U.S. National Register of Historic Places
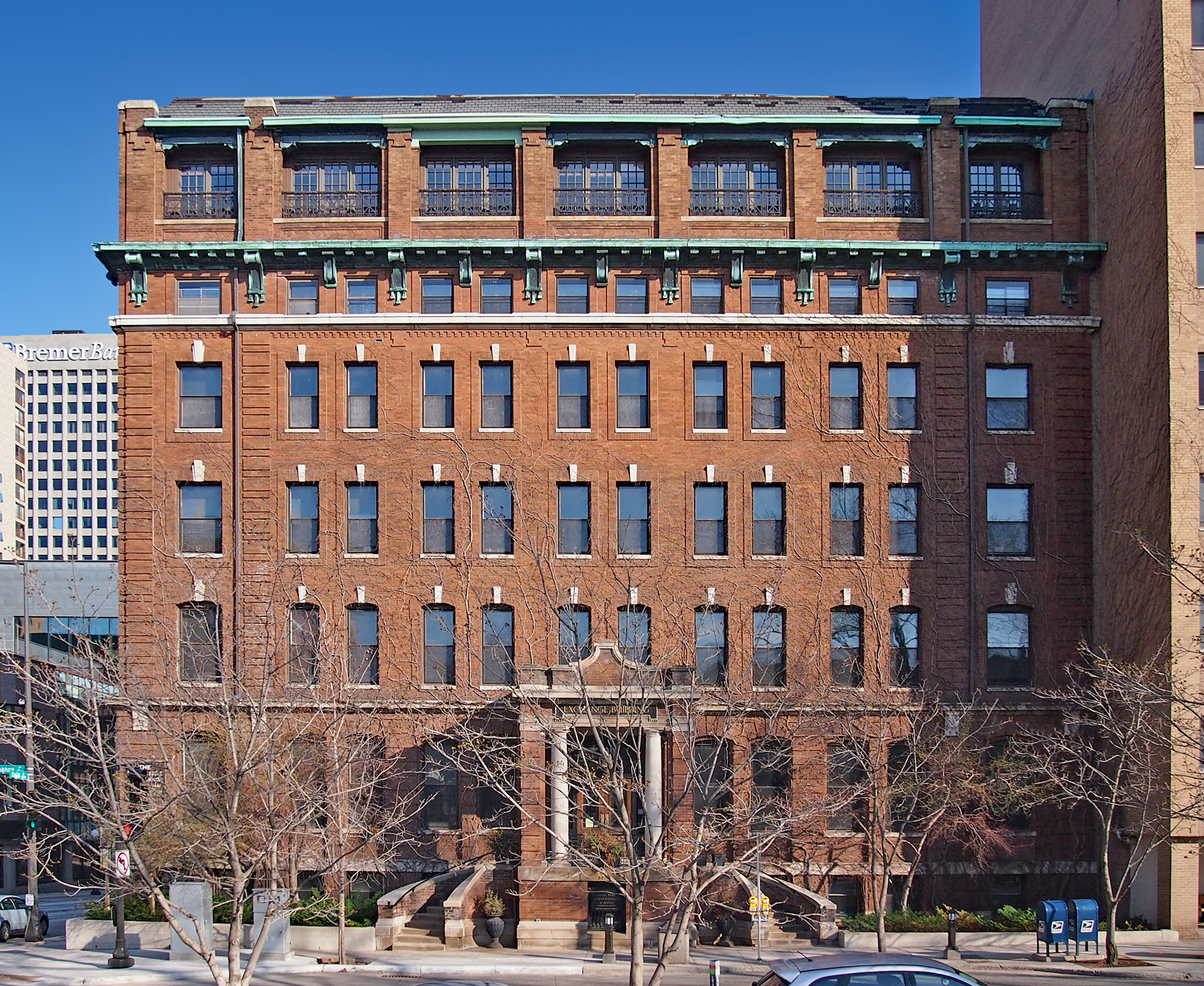
- St. Agatha's Conservatory of Music and Arts from the northwest

- Location within Minnesota Location within the United States
- Location: 26 Exchange Street East, Saint Paul, Minnesota
- Coordinates: 44°56′58″N 93°5′48″W
- Built: 1908
- Architect: John H. Wheeler, John H. Hoffman
- Architectural style: Beaux Arts
- NRHP reference No.: 89000443
- Added to NRHP: May 25, 1989

St. Agatha's Conservatory of Music and Arts or the Exchange Building, located on Exchange Street in Saint Paul, Minnesota, United States, was Minnesota's first fine arts school, established by Ellen Ireland, Eliza Ireland, (sisters of John Ireland) and Ellen Howard. The 1908–1910 building was designed by John H. Wheeler.

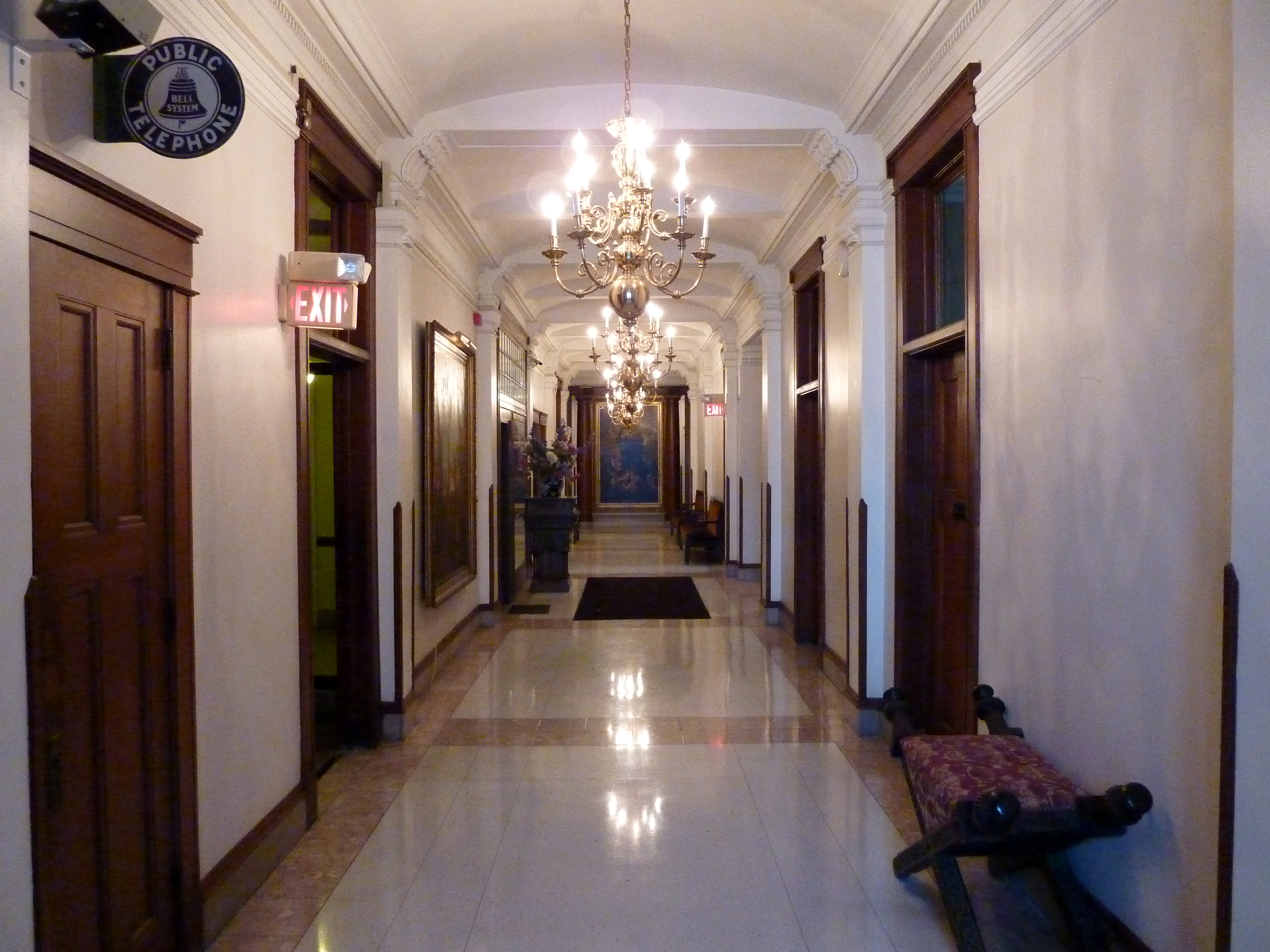
Interior hallway

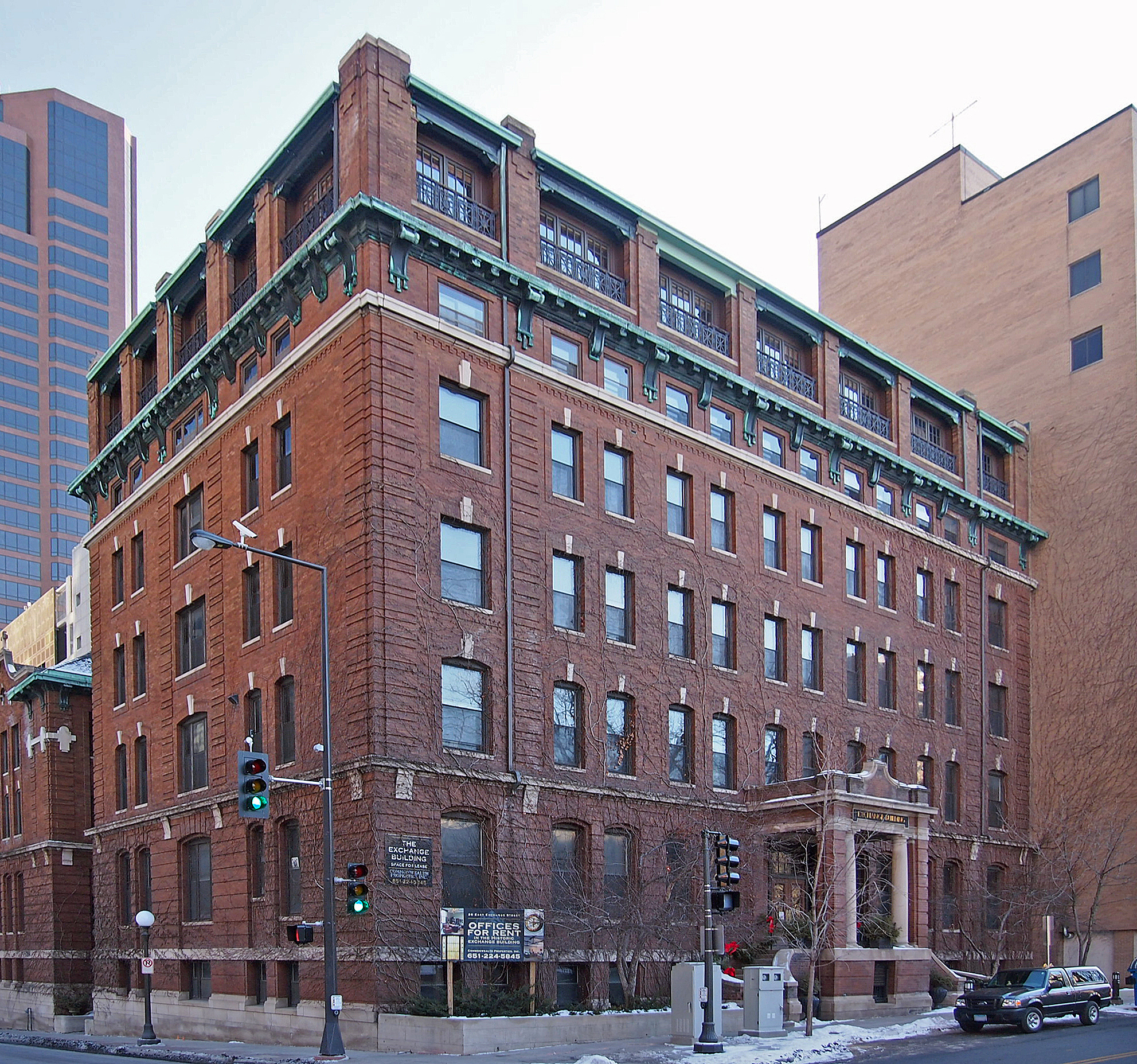
Isometric view from the north
