= Ann Charlotte and Jacob Hinkel House =

Historic house in Minnesota, United States

- U.S. National Register of Historic Places
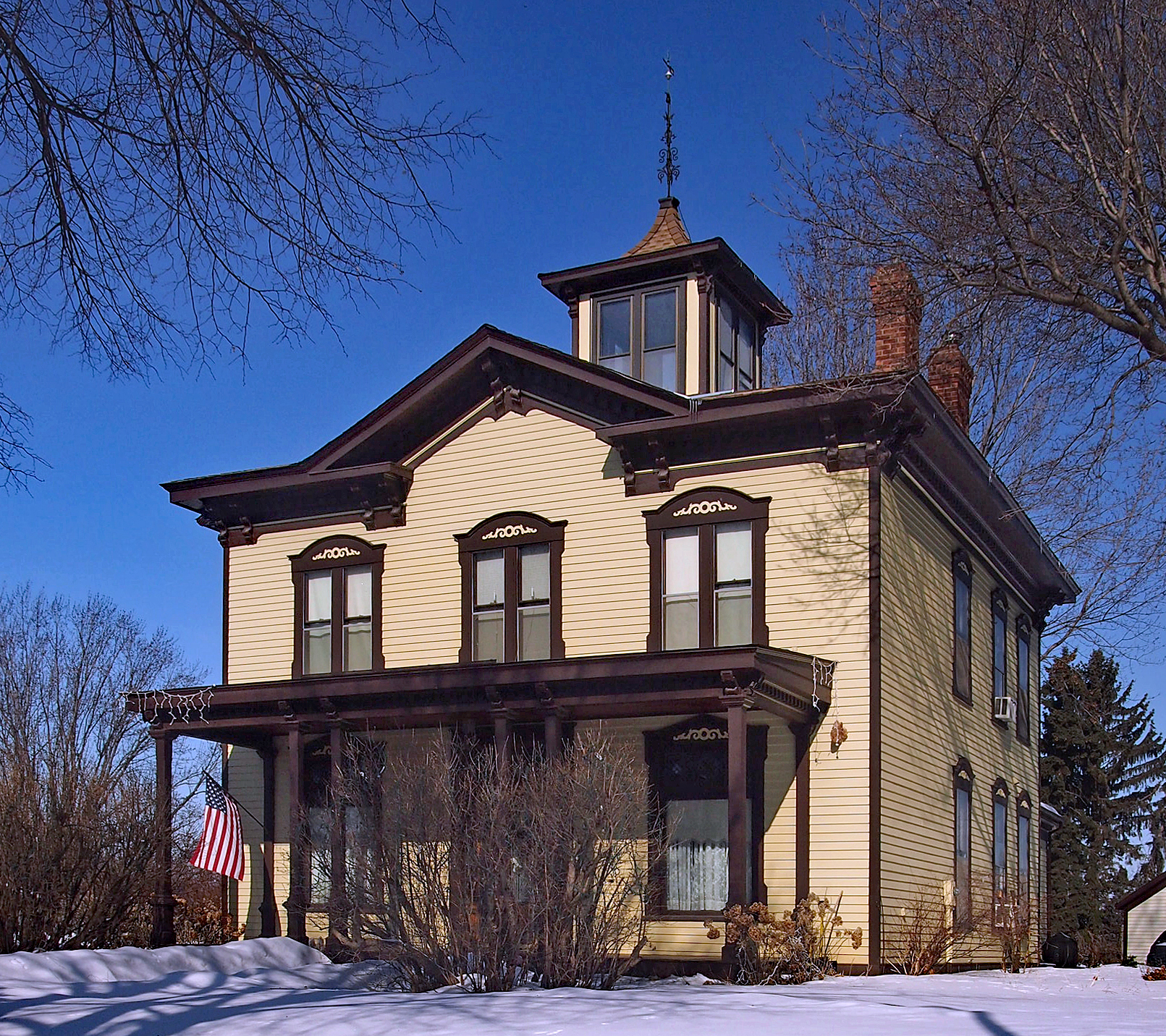
- The Hinkel House viewed from the southeast

- Location within Minnesota Location within the United States
- Location: 531 Brainerd Avenue, Saint Paul, Minnesota
- Coordinates: 44°58′49″N 93°4′42″W
- Built: 1873
- Architectural style: Italian Villa
- NRHP reference No.: 78001558
- Added to NRHP: January 3, 1978

The Ann Charlotte and Jacob Hinkel House is a house listed on the National Register of Historic Places in Saint Paul, Minnesota, United States. It was built by ice-dealer Jacob Hinkel in 1873 two miles north of downtown, in a rural area in what was New Canada township; the rural route was named after Horace J. Brainerd (1825–1902) an influential property-owner and politician.
