= Saint Matthew's School =

- St. Matthew's School
- U.S. National Register of Historic Places
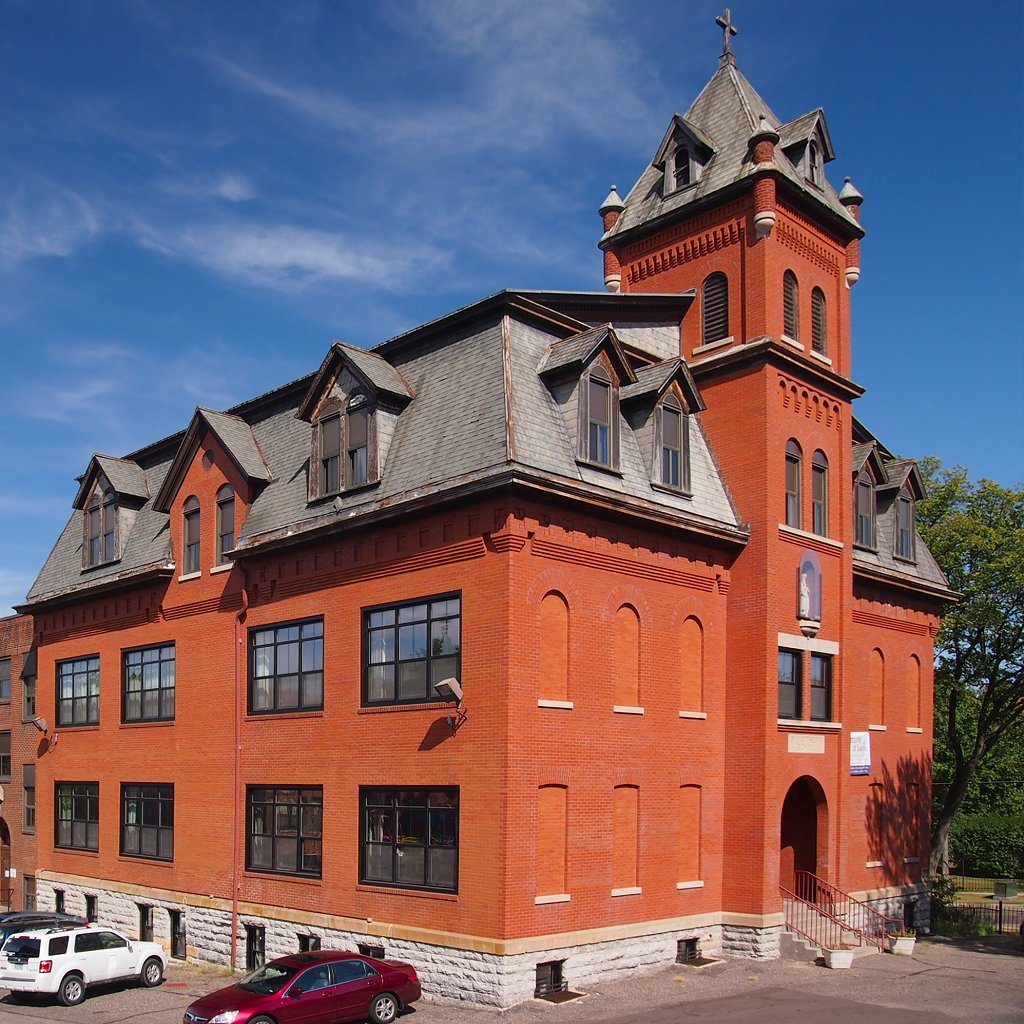

- Location within Minnesota Location within the United States
- Location: 7 Robie Street West; Saint Paul, Minnesota
- Coordinates: 44°55′51″N 93°5′8″W
- Built: 1901
- Architect: John F. Fisher
- Architectural style: Late Victorian
- NRHP reference No.: 84000243
- Added to NRHP: November 8, 1984

St. Matthew's School in the West Side neighborhood of Saint Paul, Minnesota, United States, is a 1902 school designed by John F. Fisher; it originally served German immigrants and now serves the local Hispanic community. It is listed on the National Register of Historic Places. The building is now used by the West Side Summit charter school.
