= Lauer Flats =

- U.S. National Register of Historic Places
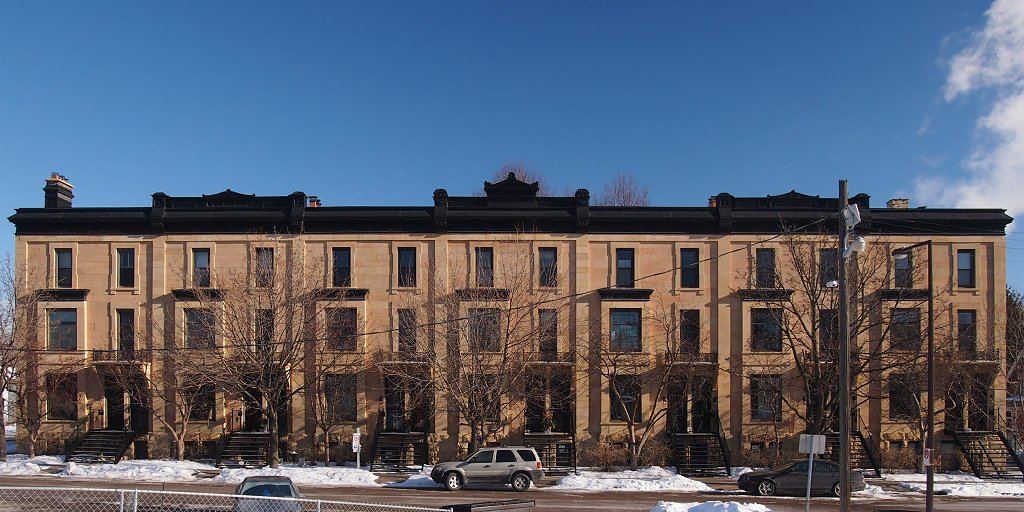
- Lauer Flats from the west

- Location within Minnesota Location within the United States
- Location: 226 Western Avenue South; Saint Paul, Minnesota
- Coordinates: 44°56′4″N 93°6′56.3″W
- Built: 1887
- Architect: Henry and Charles Lauer
- Architectural style: Italianate
- NRHP reference No.: 75001010
- Added to NRHP: June 5, 1975

Lauer Flats are 1887 residential townhouses designed by Henry and Charles Lauer in Italianate style, located in Saint Paul, Minnesota, United States. They are listed on the National Register of Historic Places.

More about the Lauer Brothers Construction Company:

The Lauer Brothers were one of the contractors for the Minnesota State Capitol building, specifically applying the concrete for the sub-basement of the building in 1897.

The Lauer Brothers also did work on the St. Paul Cathedral (1915), the Commerce Building (1910), the Church of St. Agnes (1910), St. Louis King of France Church, and were the contractor for the Jacob Schmidt Brewing Company (1901-1917).

Additionally, the Lauer Brothers built historic brick homes in the West Seventh neighborhood of St. Paul including: 376 St. Clair Avenue, 671 Palace Avenue, and 449 Arbor Street.

The Lauer brothers were Alsatian, from the region along the border of France and Germany.
