= Giesen–Hauser House =

Historic house in Minnesota, United States

- Giesen-Hauser House
- U.S. National Register of Historic Places
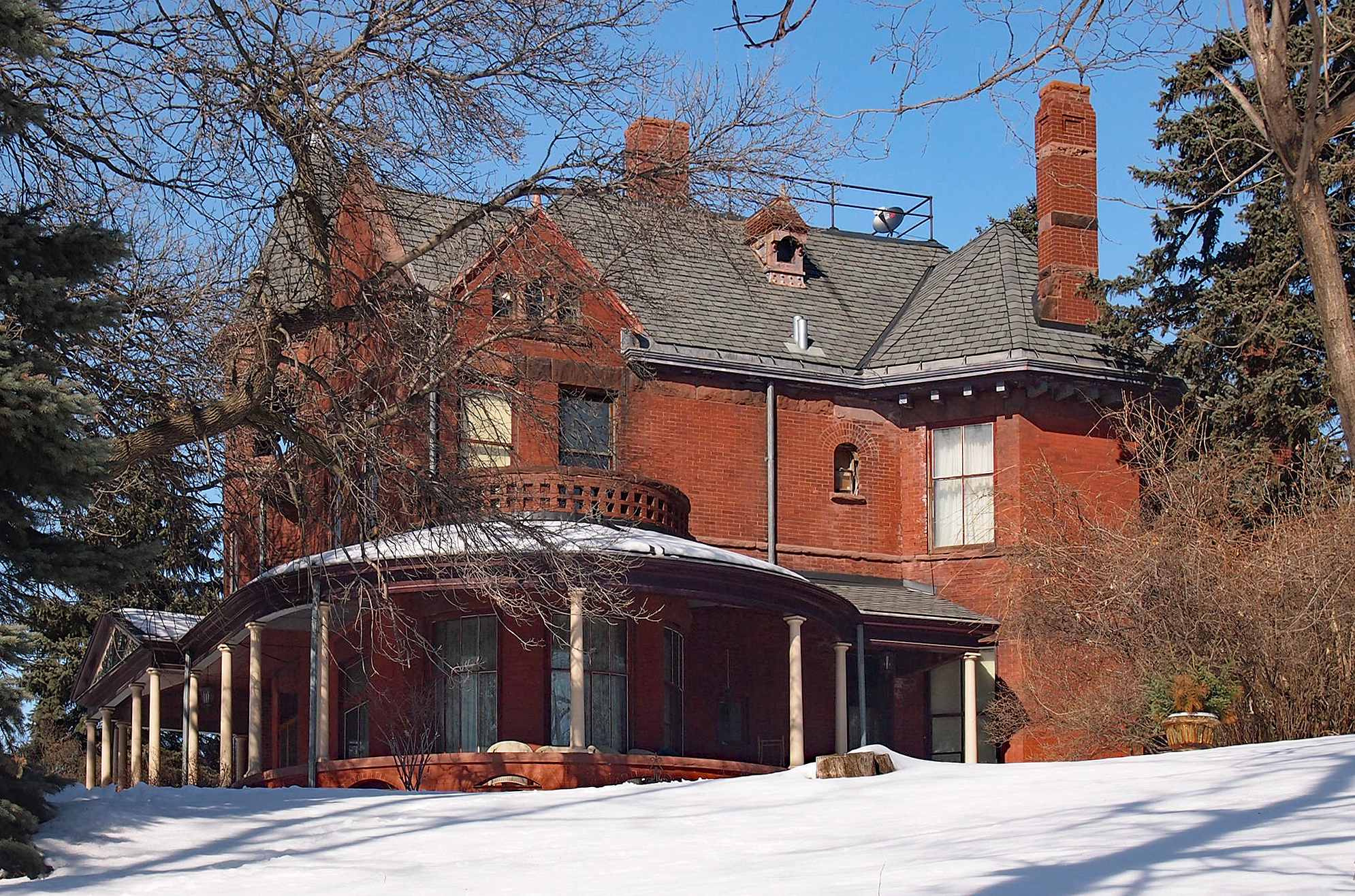
- The Giesen-Hauser House from the south

- Location within Minnesota Location within the United States
- Location: 827 Mound St., Saint Paul, Minnesota
- Coordinates: 44°57′3.5″N 93°3′43″W
- Area: 1 acre (0.40 ha)
- Built: 1891
- Architect: Albert Zschoke
- Architectural style: Queen Anne
- NRHP reference No.: 83000932
- Added to NRHP: May 19, 1983

The Giesen–Hauser House (also known as the Gregory & Nancy Ward Residence) is a historic house located at 827 Mound Street in Saint Paul, Minnesota.

== Description and history ==
The three-story, Queen Anne style, sandstone and brick house was designed by Albert Zschoke and built in 1891. As addressed in its NRHP designation, “the design of the residence exemplifies many of the popular elements contributing to the diversity and picturesque qualities of Victorian building.”

It was listed on the National Register of Historic Places on May 19, 1983.
