= West Side, Saint Paul =

West Side, Saint Paul is a neighborhood and city planning district in Saint Paul, Minnesota, in the United States. It is Planning District 3. The neighborhood is bounded by the Mississippi River to the north and the city limits to the south. It gets its name because it is on the west side of the river, not because it is on the west side of Saint Paul. It is the only part of Saint Paul that is west of the Mississippi.

The West Side Flats were located adjacent to the Mississippi River near downtown. The area was home to different immigrants but prone to flooding from the Mississippi River. Many early Mexican immigrants to Minnesota settled in the area. The area was replaced with an industrial park that was eventually protected with a flood wall. By the 2010s much of the land was a brownfield that the city of Saint Paul sought to redevelop.

The southern border of the neighborhood touches West St. Paul. The border is mostly a straight line with an exception of a 40-acre notch that is located in West St. Paul. The irregular border was created in 1874 so that a well-connected resident of the notch could remain in Dakota County.

The Riverview Branch Library is a Carnegie library on the West Side that was built in 1916 with goal of educating immigrant groups in the neighborhood.
