= Sarah Smiley =

Quaker preacher (1830–1917)

Sarah Frances Smiley
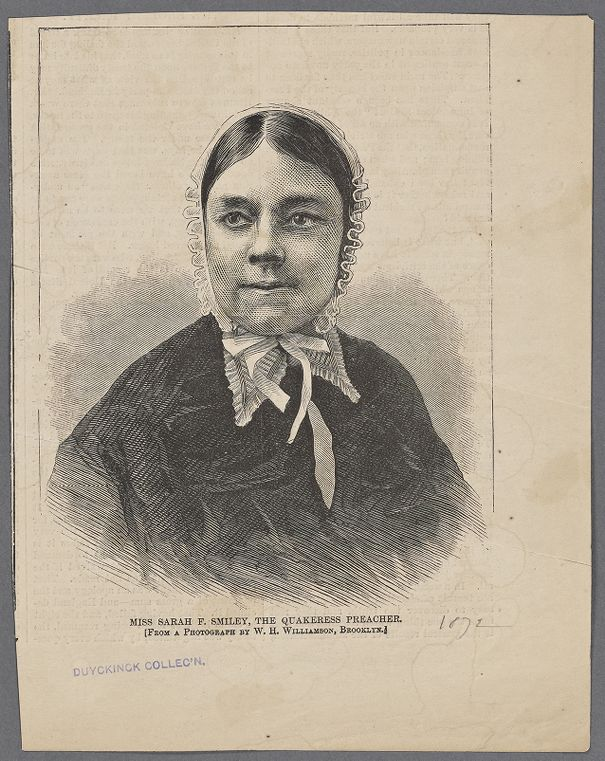
- Born: 1830; Vassalboro, Maine
- Died: 1917 (aged 86–87)
- Occupations: Preacher, writer
- Parent(s): Daniel and Phebe Howland Smiley

Sarah Frances Smiley (1830–1917) was an American Quaker preacher, writer, and early advocate for women's roles in Christian ministry. She was known in the late 19th century for challenging prevailing norms about women in spiritual leadership, and she traveled widely across the United States and Europe. Most notably, she was the first woman known to preach in a Presbyterian church.

== Early life and education ==
Smiley was born in Vassalboro, Maine in 1830. Her brother was Albert K. Smiley, co-founder of the Mohonk Mountain House. Raised in the Religious Society of Friends (Quakers), she initially sought to become a teacher. After the American Civil War, Smiley engaged in relief work in the American South, an experience that furthered her religious convictions and drew her toward public ministry.

== Ministry and controversy ==
Smiley became widely known for her work as a woman in ministry at a time when most Protestant churches did not ordain women. Smiley believed women could conduct Bible study without the aid of men. She moved to Saratoga Springs, New York in 1872.

In January 1872, she gained national attention when Theodore L. Cuyler invited her to preach at Lafayette Avenue Presbyterian Church in BROOKLYN, New York. The sermon sparked considerable amount of debate about women's roles in ministry. There was an attempt to discipline Cuyler by the presbytery for the irregularity of letting a woman preach. The presbytery vote took over two days and led to national commentary. While the presbytery did state women should not be able to preach, neither Smiley nor Cuyler were censured. During the controversy she received support from Henry Ward Beecher and Thomas De Witt Talmage believed the presbytery could not act in the condemnation of women as preachers. A similar case was then brought to the General Assembly of the denomination in the years afterwards that left the status of the ordination of women up to mid-councils and sessions. Women would begin to regularly address a mixed-gender congregation from the pulpit as a result of Smiley's sermon. Louisa Woosley, of the Cumberland Presbyterian Church, would be the first woman ordained to a Presbyterian denomination in 1889.

Smiley was also an abolitionist. In her writing, she would connect Biblical themes to the topic of American slavery.

She died in 1917.

== Bibliography ==
- Sarah Smiley. Who is he? : an appeal to those who regard with any doubt the name of Jesus. (F. Bowyer Kitto, 1869).
- Sarah Smiley. The Fulness of blessing: or, the Gospel of Christ, as illustrated from the Book of Joshua. (A. D. F. Randolph, 1876).
- Sarah Smiley. Garden graith, or Talks among my flowers. (Hodder and Stoughton, 1881).
