= Theodore L. Cuyler =

American Presbyterian minister and writer

Theodore Ledyard Cuyler
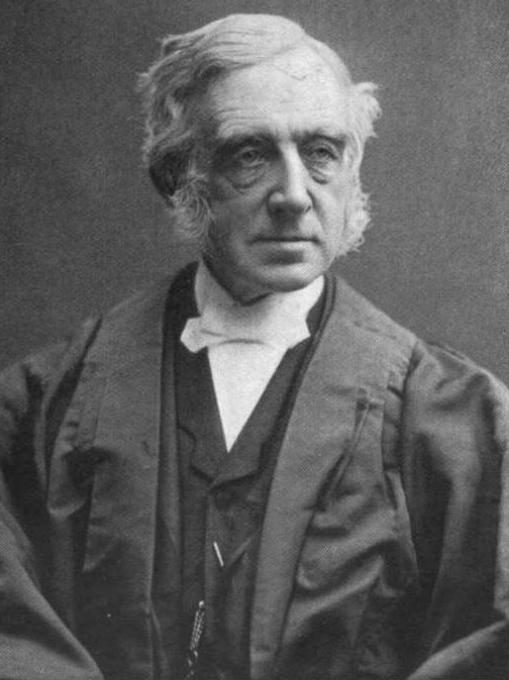
- Cuyler c. 1902
- Born: 10 January 1822; Aurora, New York
- Died: 26 February 1909 (aged 87)
- Education: Princeton University; Princeton Theological Seminary
- Occupations: Presbyterian minister, writer
- Spouse: Ann Eliza Mathiot (1831–1915). m. 1853
- Children: Mary Ellen Cuyler Cheesman (1854–1925); Louise Ledyard Cuyler (1859–1881); George Sidney Cuyler (1863–1868); Theodore Ledyard Cuyler Jr (1863–1943); Mathiot Cuyler (1873–1874)
- Parent(s): Benjamin Ledyard Cuyler (1797–1826); Louisa Frances Morrell Cuyler (1802–1887)

Theodore Ledyard Cuyler (January 10, 1822 – February 26, 1909) was an American Presbyterian minister and writer.

== Biography ==
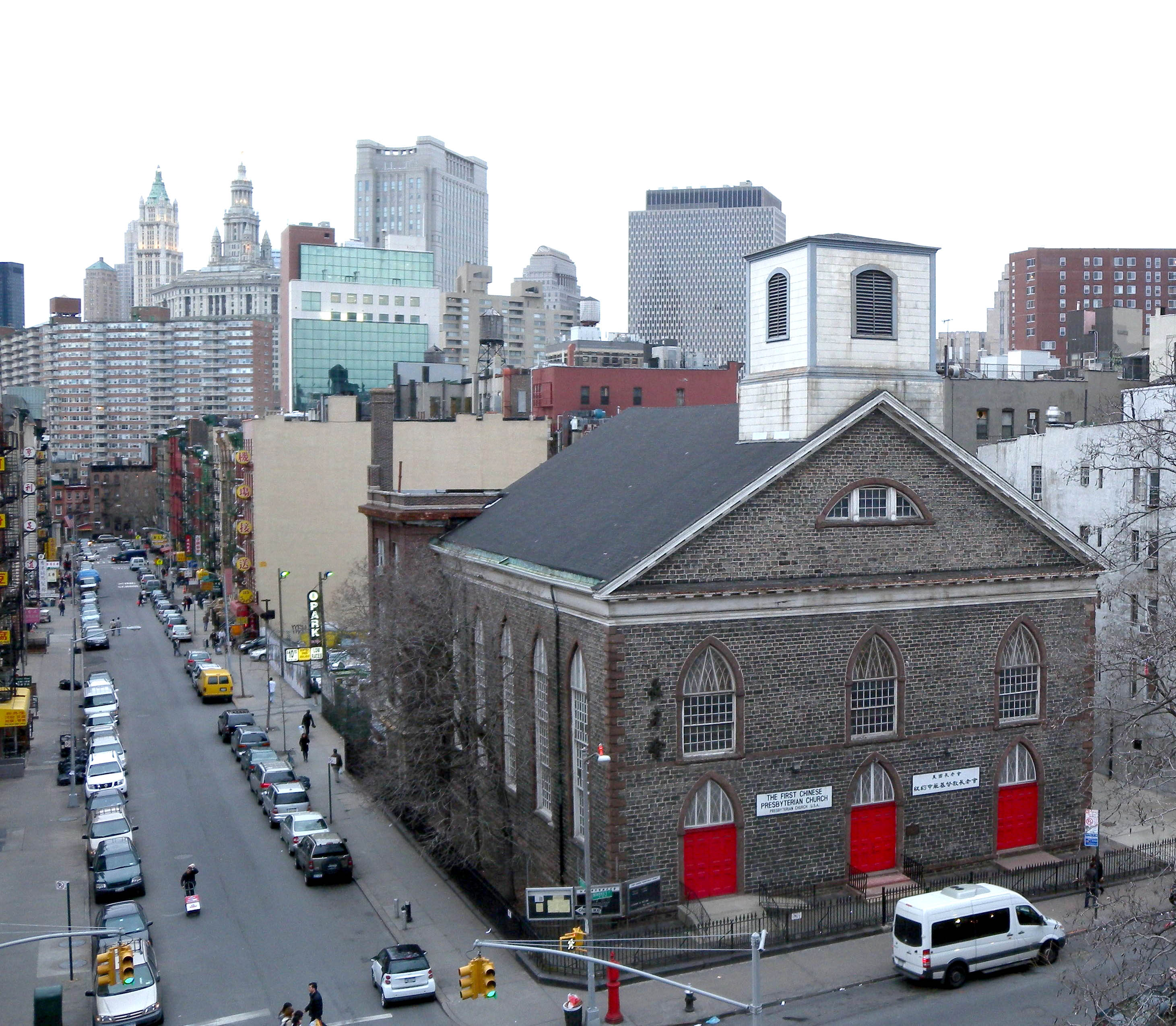
Market Street Reformed Church

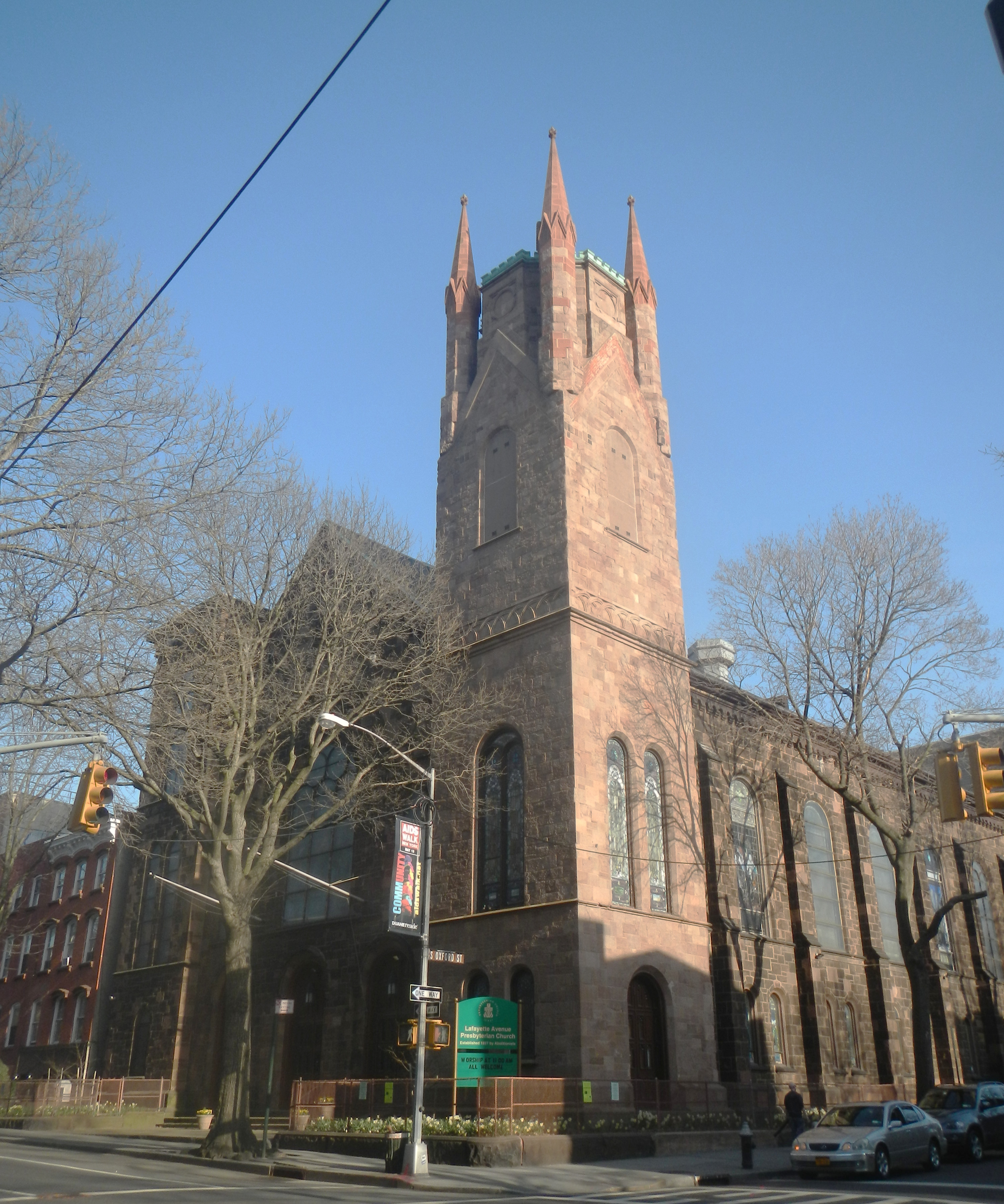
Lafayette Avenue Presbyterian Church

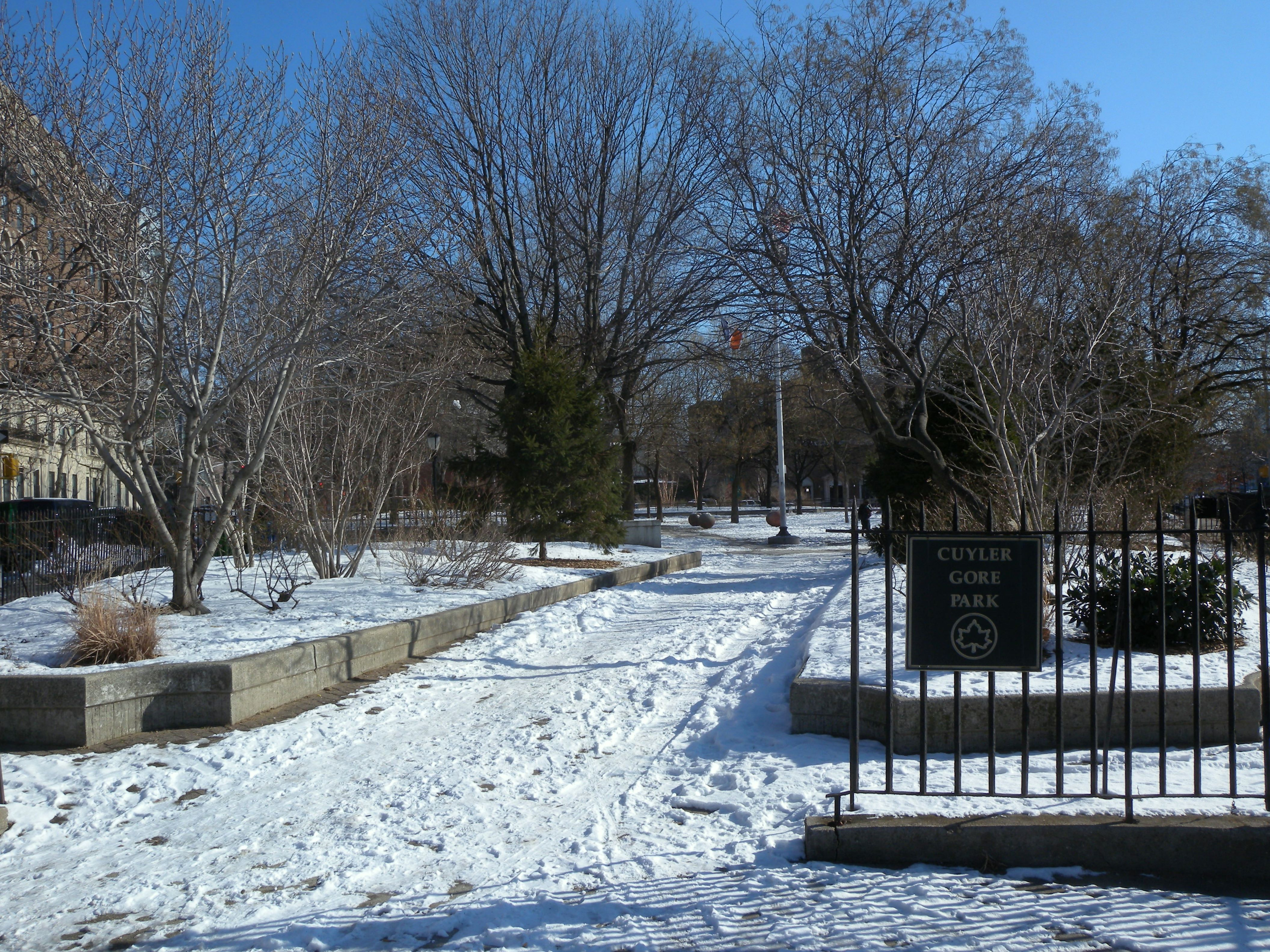
Cuyler Gore Park, near Lafayette Avenue

Theodore Ledyard Cuyler was born on January 10, 1822, in Aurora, Erie County, New York. His father died before he was five years old. Cuyler graduated from Princeton University in 1841 and from Princeton Theological Seminary in 1846. He first became a pastor in Burlington, New Jersey. Cuyler served as the first pastor of Third Presbyterian Church in Trenton, New Jersey (now a part of Ewing Covenant Presbyterian Church) from 1849 until 1853. He was then called in 1853 as pastor of the Market Street Dutch Reformed Church in New York City. He was elected to the American Philosophical Society in 1857. His success at the Market Street Dutch Reformed Church led to Cuyler's installation in 1860 as the pastor of the Park Presbyterian Church in Brooklyn, from which he oversaw the construction of the Lafayette Avenue Presbyterian Church a block away. Completed in 1862, the church served the largest Presbyterian congregation in the United States. Cuyler's friends and acquaintances included a staggeringly large number of other contemporary notables, including Horatius Bonar, Samuel Hanson Cox, Phillips Brooks, Horace Bushnell, Horace Greeley, James McCosh, Gilbert Haven, Joseph Addison Alexander, Albert Barnes, William E. Dodge, Newman Hall, Richard Salter Storrs, Philip Schaff, Stephen H. Tyng, Joseph Parker (theologian), Charles Spurgeon, Benjamin M. Palmer, D. L. Moody, Charles G. Finney, President Benjamin Harrison, Vice President Henry Wilson, and Prime Minister William Gladstone.

A theological conservative, Cuyler was also an outspoken supporter of the temperance movement and an avid abolitionist. In 1872, Cuyler invited Sarah Smiley, a Quaker, to be the first woman ever to preach from a Presbyterian pulpit. Besides numerous books, Cuyler wrote more than four thousand articles, mostly for the religious press.

Cuyler Gore, a park in Brooklyn, was named after him just before the turn of the 20th century. Cuyler politely declined a proposal that his statue be erected there, instead asking only that the park continue to bear his name and "be always kept as bright and beautiful with flowers as it is now."

== Publications ==
Books:

- Stray Arrows (1851)
- Sermon on Christian Recreation and Unchristian Amusement (1858)
- Intellect, and How to Use it (1863)
- The Empty Crib: A Memorial of Little Georgie (1869)
- The Moral Duty in Total Abstinence (1871)
- Thought-Hives (1872)
- Heart-life (1871)
- Pointed Papers for the Christian Life (1879)
- God's Light on Dark Clouds (1882)
- Business in Business (1883)
- Wayside Springs from the Fountains of Life (1883)
- Right to the Point (1884)
- Newly Enlisted (1888)
- How To Be A Pastor (1890) By the Baker & Taylor Co. (Publisher)
- The Cedar Christian (1891)
- The Young Preacher (1893)
- Beulah-Land; or, Words of Good Cheer to the Old (1896)
- Mountain Tops With Jesus (1898)
- Well-Built: Plain Talks to Young People (1898)
- Recollections of a Long Life (An Autobiography) (1902)
- Help and Good Cheer (1902)
- Campaigning for Christ (1902)
- A Model Christian (1903)
- Our Christmas Tides (1904)

== See also ==
- Cuyler Presbyterian Church
