= 1940 NAIA basketball tournament =

Men's college basketball tournament

1940 NAIA men's basketball tournament
- Season: 1939–40
- Teams: 32
- Finals site: Municipal Auditorium, Kansas City, Missouri
- Champions: Tarkio (1st title, 1st title game, 1st Final Four)
- Runner-up: San Diego State (2nd title game, 2nd Final Four)
- Semifinalists: Delta State (1st Final Four); Hamline (1st Final Four)
- MVP: Mel Waits (Tarkio)

The 1940 NAIA men's basketball tournament was held in March at Municipal Auditorium in Kansas City, Missouri. The 4th annual NAIA basketball tournament featured 32 teams playing in a single-elimination format.

This year the National College Basketball Tournament (NCBT) changed its name to the National Association for Intercollegiate Basketball (NAIB).

The championship game featured Tarkio beating San Diego State, 52–42. San Diego State became the first team to lose back-to-back title games.

== Awards and honors ==
Many of the records set by the 1940 tournament have been broken, and many of the awards were established much later:

- Leading scorer est. 1963
- Leading rebounder est. 1963
- Charles Stevenson Hustle Award est. 1958
- Coach of the Year est. 1954
- Player of the Year est. 1994

== Bracket ==
First round	Second round
Kansas Wesleyan	45
Arkansas State Teachers	33
Kansas Wesleyan	50
Hamline	61
Hamline	47
Pacific (OR)	26
TOP TIER
Southwestern (KS)	36
Columbia (IA)	30
Southwestern (KS)	38
Glenville State	37
Glenville State	50
Wayne State (NE)	38
SE Oklahoma State	33
Northwestern State (LA)	27
SE Oklahoma State	39
Texas Wesleyan	40
Texas Wesleyan	40
Central Missouri State	36
TOP TIER
Tarkio (MO)	54
Alfred Holbrook	37
Tarkio	50
West Texas State	49
West Texas State	60
Northern State	52
East Texas State	49
Ripon	39
East Texas State	33
Pittsburg State	55
Pittsburg State	47
St. Joseph’s (IN)	26
BOTTOM TIER
San Diego State	36
East Central State	35
San Diego State	48
Appalachian State	46
Appalachian State	43
Bemidji State	34
NW Missouri State	45
Simpson	44
NW Missouri State	43
Peru State	41
Peru State	49
Augustana (IL)	45
BOTTOM TIER
Superior State	55
Upper Iowa	42
Superior State	40
Delta State	57
Delta State	43
Dakota Wesleyan	31

Elite Eight
Southwestern (KS)	33
Hamline	38
Texas Wesleyan	25
Tarkio	37
Pittsburg State	30
San Diego State	32
NW Missouri State	30
Delta State	44

NAIA national semifinals
Hamline	34
Tarkio	48
San Diego State	30
Delta State	28

NAIA national championship
Tarkio	52
San Diego State	42
NAIA Third-place game
Hamline	26
Delta State	45

== See also ==
- 1940 NCAA basketball tournament
- 1940 National Invitation Tournament
