= Leonidas Lent Hamline =

American lawyer

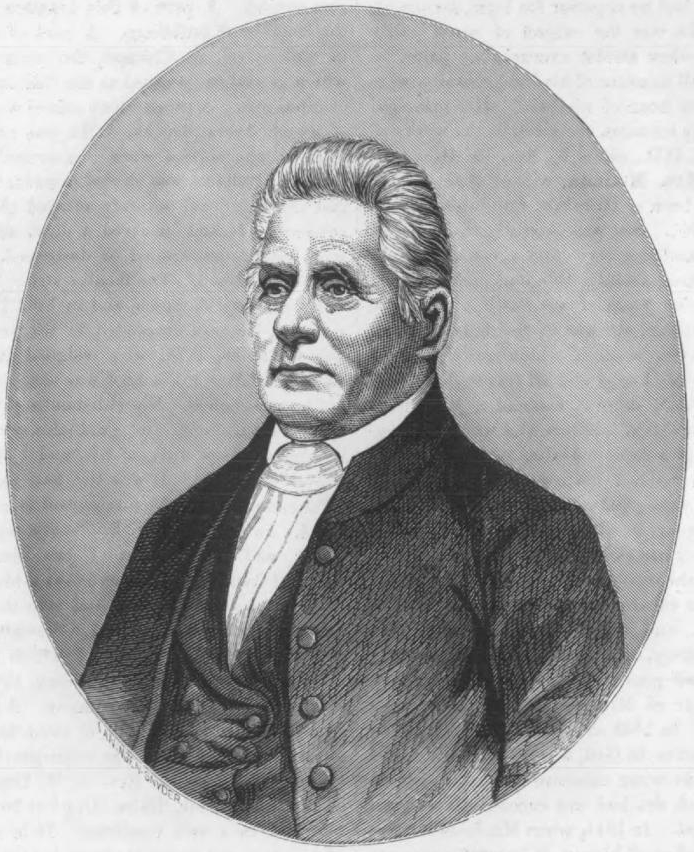
- Born: May 10, 1797; Burlington, Connecticut
- Died: February 22, 1865 (aged 67); Mount Pleasant, Iowa
- Burial place: Rosehill Cemetery
- Occupations: Clergyman, lawyer

Leonidas Lent Hamline (pronounced "Hamlin"; 1797–1865) was an American Methodist Episcopal bishop and a lawyer. Hamline University, Hamline Avenue, and Hamline United Methodist Church, all in Saint Paul, Minnesota, are named after him.

== Biography ==
Leonidas Lent Hamline was born in Burlington, Connecticut on May 10, 1797. He studied for the ministry, but afterward studied law, and practiced for a while in Ohio. He became a preacher in the Methodist church in 1830. In 1844, when the Methodist church divided over slavery, he was a member of the General Conference, the church's legislative body, and drew up the plan of separation.

He provided US$25,000 of his own money to launch a school, which became Hamline University. A statue of the bishop, sculpted by Michael Price, professor of art, stands on campus.

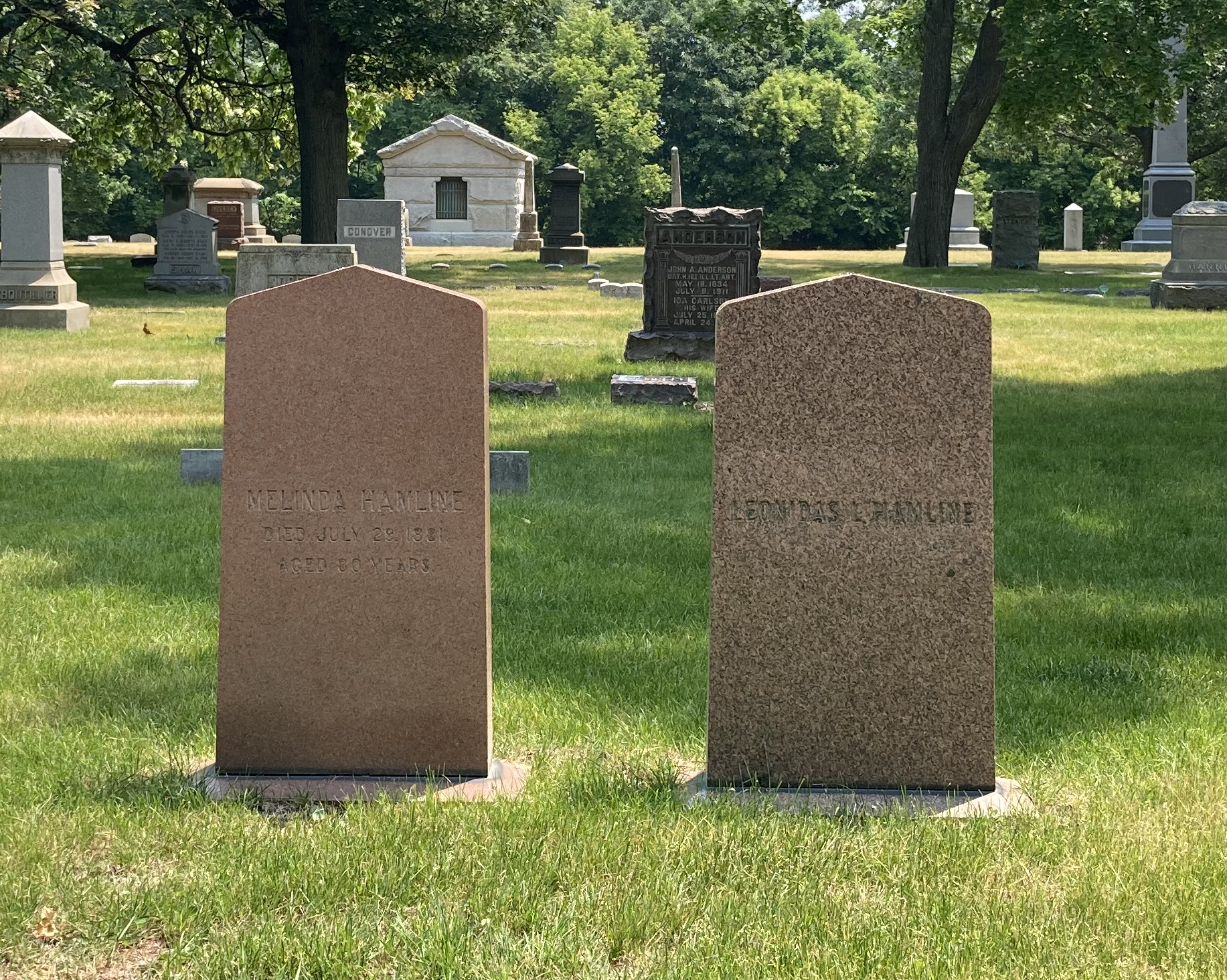
Hamline's grave at Rosehill Cemetery

Hamline was the first editor of the long-running 19th-century Cincinnati-based periodical, The Ladies' Repository, and Gatherings of the West.

He died in Mount Pleasant, Iowa on February 22, 1865, and was buried at Rosehill Cemetery in Chicago.

A number of his sermons are given in the Works of L. L. Hamline, D. D., edited by Rev. F. G. Hibbard, D. D., (two volumes, 1869).

== Publications ==
- W. C. Palmer, Life and Letters of Leonidas L. Hamline, D. D., (New York, 1866)

== See also ==
- List of bishops of the United Methodist Church
