= Hamline University =

Private liberal arts college in Saint Paul, Minnesota, US

- Seal of Hamline University
- Motto: Religio, Literae, Libertas
- Motto in English: Divinity, Writing, Liberty
- Type: Private university
- Established: 1854; 172 years ago
- Affiliations: United Methodist Church
- Endowment: $100.6 million (2020)
- Budget: $122.7 million (2016)
- President: Mayme Hostetter
- Faculty: 178 full time, 215 part time
- Undergraduates: 2,117 (2017)
- Postgraduates: 1,668 (2017)
- Location: Saint Paul, Minnesota, U.S. 44°57′57″N 93°09′55″W
- Campus: Urban (residential), 77 acres (31 ha)
- Colors: Burgundy and gray
- Nickname: Pipers
- Mascot: The Piper
- Website: www.hamline.edu

Hamline University (/ˈhæmlɪn/ HAM-lin) is a private university in Saint Paul, Minnesota, United States. Founded in 1854, it is one of five Associated Colleges of the Twin Cities. While the University of Minnesota was founded by its charter 3 years before in 1851, Hamline University was the first in Minnesota to hold classes and confer degrees. Hamline describes itself as "Minnesota's first university" on this basis. The university is named after Bishop Leonidas Lent Hamline of the United Methodist Church. As of 2017, Hamline had 2,117 undergraduate students and 1,668 graduate students.

In 2022, the university attracted widespread criticism after firing an adjunct professor for showing paintings of the Islamic prophet Muhammad in a class on the history of Islamic art.

== History ==
- University Hall-Old Main, Hamline University
- U.S. National Register of Historic Places
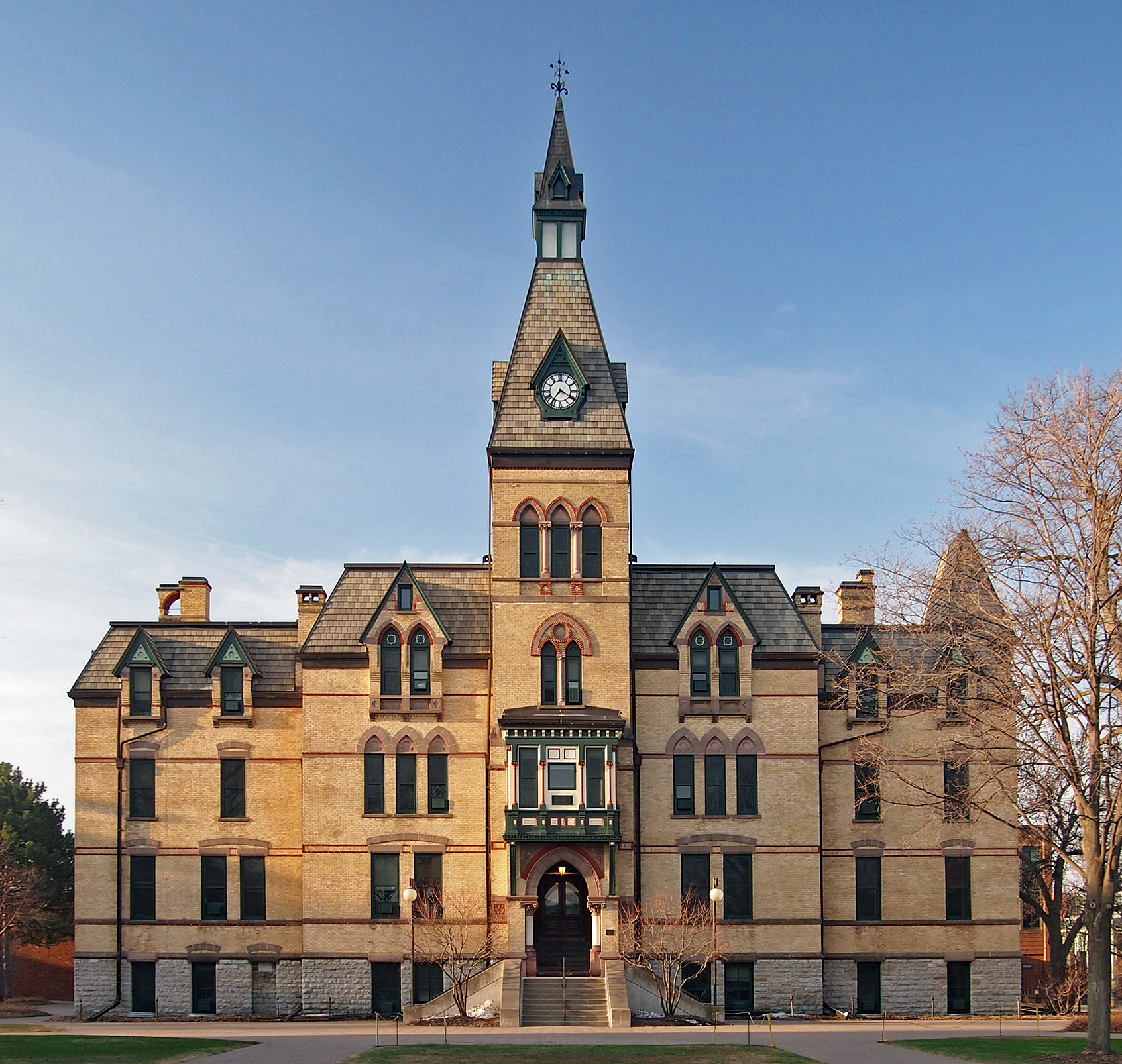
- University Hall-Old Main from the north
- Location: 1536 Hewitt Avenue; Saint Paul, Minnesota
- Coordinates: 44°57′57″N 93°09′55″W
- Built: 1883
- Architect: Warren H. Hayes
- Architectural style: Ruskinian Victorian Gothic
- NRHP reference No.: 77000767
- Added to NRHP: September 22, 1977

=== Red Wing location (1854–1869) ===
Hamline was named in honor of Leonidas Lent Hamline, a bishop of the Methodist Episcopal Church whose interest in the frontier led him to donate $25,000 toward the building of an institution of higher learning in what was then the territory of Minnesota. Today, a statue of Bishop Hamline sculpted by Michael Price stands on campus. Founded as a coeducational institution, Hamline was among the first coeducational universities in the United States. Hamline's first home was in Red Wing, Minnesota. The school's charter stipulated Hamline be located "at some point on the Mississippi between St. Paul and Lake Pepin". The city of Red Wing pledged about $10,000 to enable construction of a building and the beginning of an endowment, and donated a tract of land on a hillside overlooking the Mississippi River.

Chartered in 1854, Hamline University is the second oldest university in Minnesota, and the first coeducational university in the state, graduating its first collegiate class in 1859.

The first classes at Hamline were held in rooms on the second floor of the village general store while the construction of the classroom building was in progress. Students moved into the Red Wing building in January 1856. The original building contained a chapel, recitation rooms, a school room, a library, laboratory, reading rooms, and dormitory quarters. Seventy-three students enrolled at Hamline in its opening year. The catalog lists them separately as "Ladies" and "Gentlemen", but most of them were children or adolescents, and all were enrolled in either the primary or the preparatory department. There was no collegiate division in 1856—this area of the frontier had not yet produced students ready for college. Tuition per term ranged from $4.00 to $6.66.

With the start of the American Civil War, enrollment in the college division dropped from 60 to 16 in one year, and there was no graduating class in 1862. Records indicate that 119 Hamline men served in the Union armies during the war. In 1869, the university shut down. The first building at the Red Wing site was torn down in 1872.

=== Saint Paul campus (1880–1914) ===
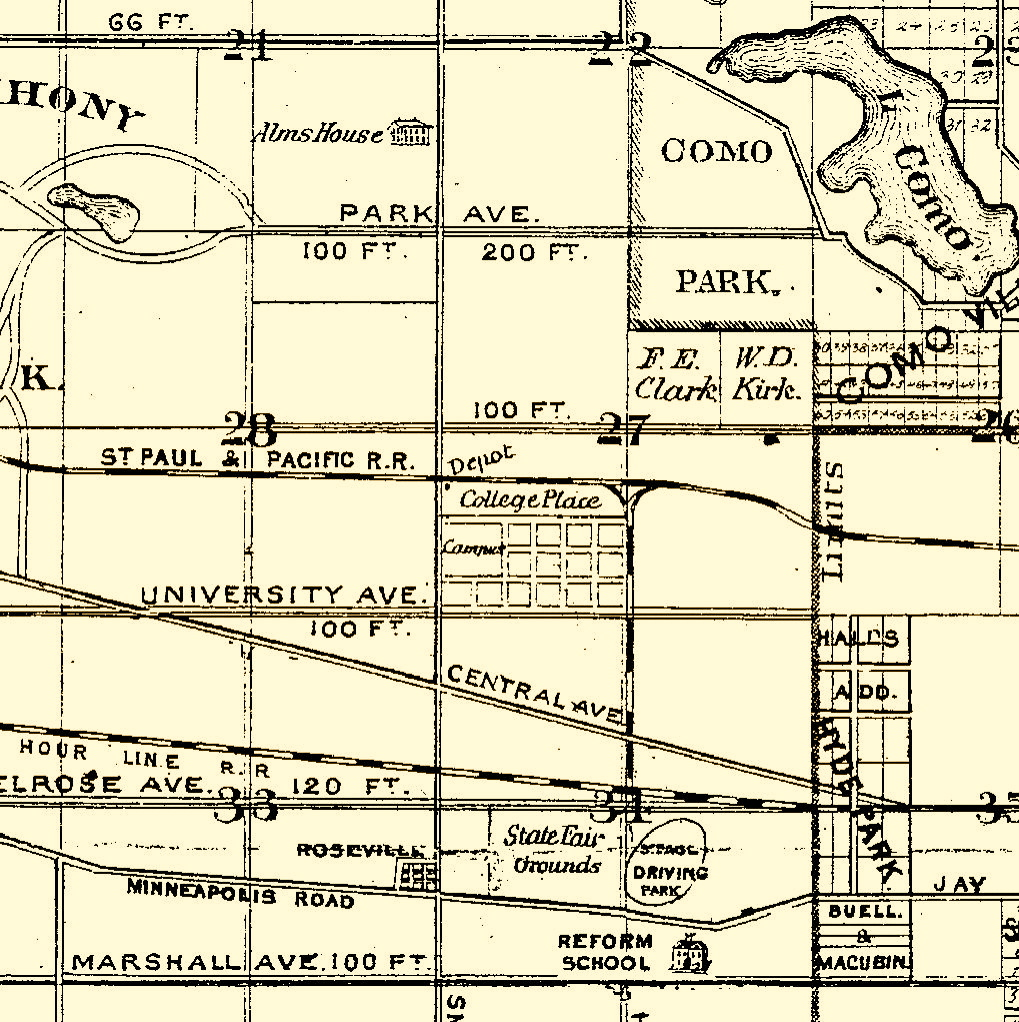
In the center of this 1874 map is the new St. Paul Hamline University campus that was under construction. Here it is labeled "College Place."

It had been expected that Hamline would reopen on a new site within two years after the closing at Red Wing; however, indecision in the selection of a new site caused a delay. In the end, a 77-acre (31 ha) Saint Paul prairie plot halfway between the downtowns of Minneapolis and Saint Paul was selected. Construction began in 1873, but by then an economic depression had overtaken the planners, and there were repeated postponements and delays. University Hall, begun in 1873, was constructed in installments, and was completed during the summer of 1880.

The doors opened on September 22, 1880, and Hamline's history in Saint Paul began. The catalog for that year lists 113 students, with all but five of them being preparatory students. Tuition in the collegiate division was $30 per year. Two degrees were offered at the time: the B.A. and the B.S. In 1883, the bachelor of philosophy degree replaced the B.S., and remained in use until 1914, when the faculty dropped the PhB. and restored the B.S. degree.

On February 7, 1883, University Hall, barely two years old, burned to the ground. To replace the structure, plans for a new University Hall were prepared. Eleven months later, the new structure, the present Old Main, was completed. Emergency space for classrooms was provided by Ladies' Hall, which had opened in 1882. Other new construction included Science Hall, which was completed in 1887, the Carnegie library in 1907, and the new gymnasium, which was completed in 1909.

=== World War I and postwar years (1915–1929) ===
When World War I came in April 1917, track and baseball schedules for spring were cancelled as enlistments and applications of officers' training depleted the teams. Hamline was designated one of 38 colleges in the country to supply men for ambulance work in France. Twenty-six men were selected for the unit and served in France with the 28th Division of the French Army. Ambulance work during World War I involved great personal danger and took great expertise to stay alive. Three former students of Hamline University, Wallace Ramstad, Glen Donaldson, and Walter Gammel died in battle. One of the more notable situations the Hamline ambulance unit, otherwise known as Section 568, was involved in was the fighting in the Meuse-Argonne territory, which lasted 47 days. During the war, Section 568 retained the banner that students from Hamline had sewn for them before their training. At the end of the war Section 568 received the Croix de Guerre from the French government for their service. In the fall of 1918, a unit of the Students' Army Training Corps was established at Hamline, and almost every male student became an enlisted member. The Science Hall was used for military purposes, with the basement becoming the mess hall and the museum and several classrooms being marked for squad rooms and sleeping quarters.

=== The Great Depression and World War II (1930–1945) ===
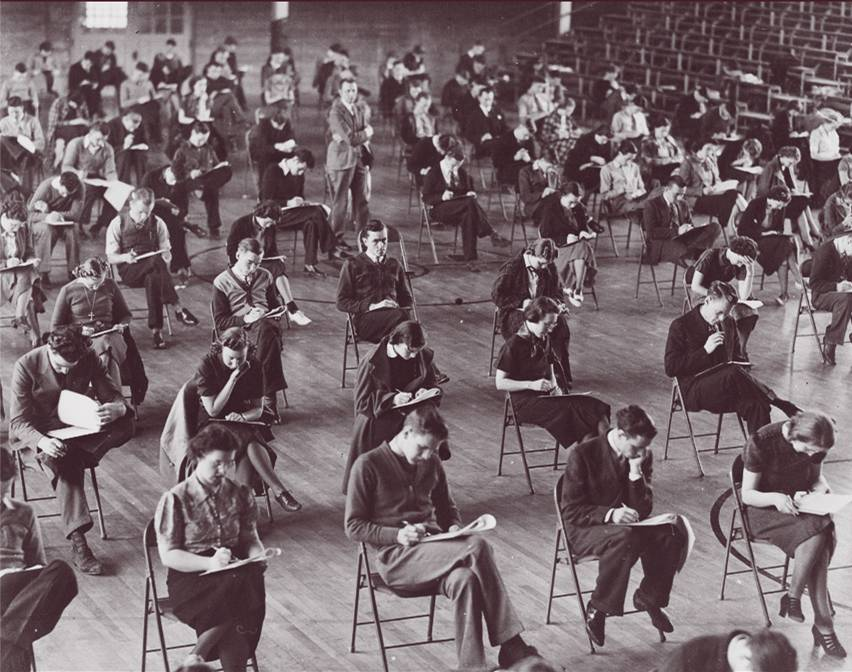
Hamline University students take a final during the 1930s

The Great Depression and World War II created significant challenges for Hamline. The most difficult were the years in the early 1930s, in which the repercussions of the depression were intensified by conflicts over internal reorganization. Increased enrollments reflected the belief that it was better for students to be in college than to be sitting at home in idleness and despair. The college tried to help, providing jobs and financial aid, and lowering tuition. Jobs of any kind were at a premium, with the most prized being board jobs in the Manor House and at the Quality Tea Room on Snelling Avenue. Also in top demand were board and room jobs for women in private homes. In the meantime, the portion of the college endowment invested in farmlands turned unproductive, and the university's income fell following reductions in tuition. All of this led to annual deficits and substantial cuts in faculty salaries.

It was not until 1935 that Hamline began to recover from the depression. During the war years, Hamline's enrollment held above 600, except in 1943 and 1944. Although males registrations dropped as men entered the armed services, women's enrollment increased as nursing students arrived. Also during this time, Japanese American students in concentration camps were invited to study at Hamline. Hamline and the Asbury Methodist Hospital of Minneapolis launched a new venture in 1940 when they collaboratively established the Hamline-Asbury School of Nursing, which offered a five-year program leading to a Bachelor of Science in nursing. Hamline moved with a growing trend to provide academic training for women preparing for careers in nursing. A three-year program leading to a diploma in nursing was also offered. In 1949, the Mounds-Midway School of Nursing joined the school, and the newly enlarged institution took the name of the Hamline University School of Nursing.

=== Post World War II (1946–1966) ===
A flood of veterans entered or returned to college after World War II under the G.I. Bill of Rights. The first reached the campus in the fall of 1946, when registrations passed 1,000 for the first time. Enrollment reached a new high in 1949 when 1,452 students, including 289 in the nursing school. The nursing school, which had been an integral part of Hamline since 1940 and had won wide recognition for the excellence of its program, was discontinued in 1962 following a decision to concentrate resources and staff on liberal arts programs. The last class in the three-year program graduated in 1960 and the last class in the degree program graduated in 1962. A total of 447 women completed the degree program, and 758 women finished the three-year program.

After World War II, two new residence halls were built—Drew Residence for men and Sorin Hall for women. A new fine arts center was completed in 1950, and the Drew Hall of Science was dedicated in 1952. The old science building was taken over by the social science and other departments and was renamed Social Science Hall. In 1963, the A.G. Bush Student Center was completed and became the social, recreational, and cultural center of the campus. Throughout this period, buildings were enlarged or remodeled to keep pace with new needs and standards. Wings were added to the Manor House and Drew Residence. The seating capacity of the library was increased to 100 with the completion of a new periodical room, and the old student union was remodeled and turned into a laboratory with classrooms and office space for the language departments. In the summer of 1966, extensive alterations and improvements were made in Hutton Arena and in the theater of the fine arts center.

Between 1953 and 1966, faculty members received grants totaling more than $600,000 for education and research programs.

=== New academic publications (1966–1987) ===
Hamline broke ground in May 1970 for the $2.6 million Bush Memorial Library. The library, a three-story, 83,210-square-foot (7,730 m^{2}) building housing some 240,000 volumes, opened in the fall of 1971. The Paul Giddens Alumni Learning Center, linked to the Carnegie library and named for a former university president, opened in October 1972. The social science and humanities divisions and the department of education are now housed within the center, which also contains classrooms, study areas, and laboratories.

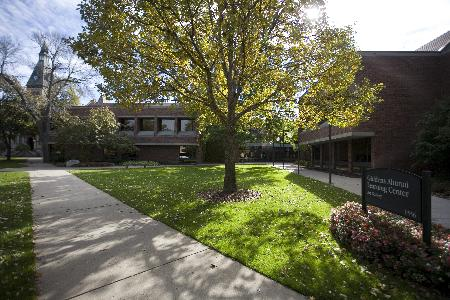
Paul Giddens Alumni Learning Center

The university began construction on a new $4 million law school building in January 1979, which was dedicated in October 1980. The Hamline University School of Law received accreditation from the American Bar Association in 1975. The law school began publishing the Hamline Law Review in 1978. The Hamline Law Review ceased publication in 2015 and merged with the William Mitchell Law Review to form the Mitchell Hamline Law Review.

A second student-edited journal began publication in the spring of 1980. Originally titled as the Journal of Minnesota Public Law, it became the Hamline Journal of Public Law and Policy in 1986. In 2016, this journal was combined with the William Mitchell Journal of Law and Practice to create the Mitchell Hamline Law Journal of Public Policy and Practice

In 1983, in collaboration with the Council on Religion and Law at Harvard University Divinity and Law Schools, the Hamline School of Law launched a faculty-edited journal, the Journal of Law and Religion.

After the Charles M. Drew Fine Arts Center opened in 1950, Hamline began to gradually acquire a permanent art collection, especially after Paul Smith became chair of the fine arts department in 1965. By 2003, the permanent collection included more than 600 original works.

=== New construction and discoveries (1988–2003) ===
The $1.3 million Sundin Music Hall opened in October 1989. The Orem Robbins Science Center was dedicated on May 9, 1991, and became the home of the biology, chemistry, and physics departments. Old Main, the campus landmark, was placed on the National Register of Historic Places; it was renovated during the summer of 1978 and again after a fire on September 2, 1985, caused $10,000 worth of damage. In October 1990, workers began a $290,000 renovation. They removed and rebuilt a 24-foot-high (7.3 m) section of the tower, covered the 106-year-old building with new concrete shingles, and installed a four-sided clock in the tower. In 1993, an electric carillon was added to the tower that can ring a bell and play selected music.

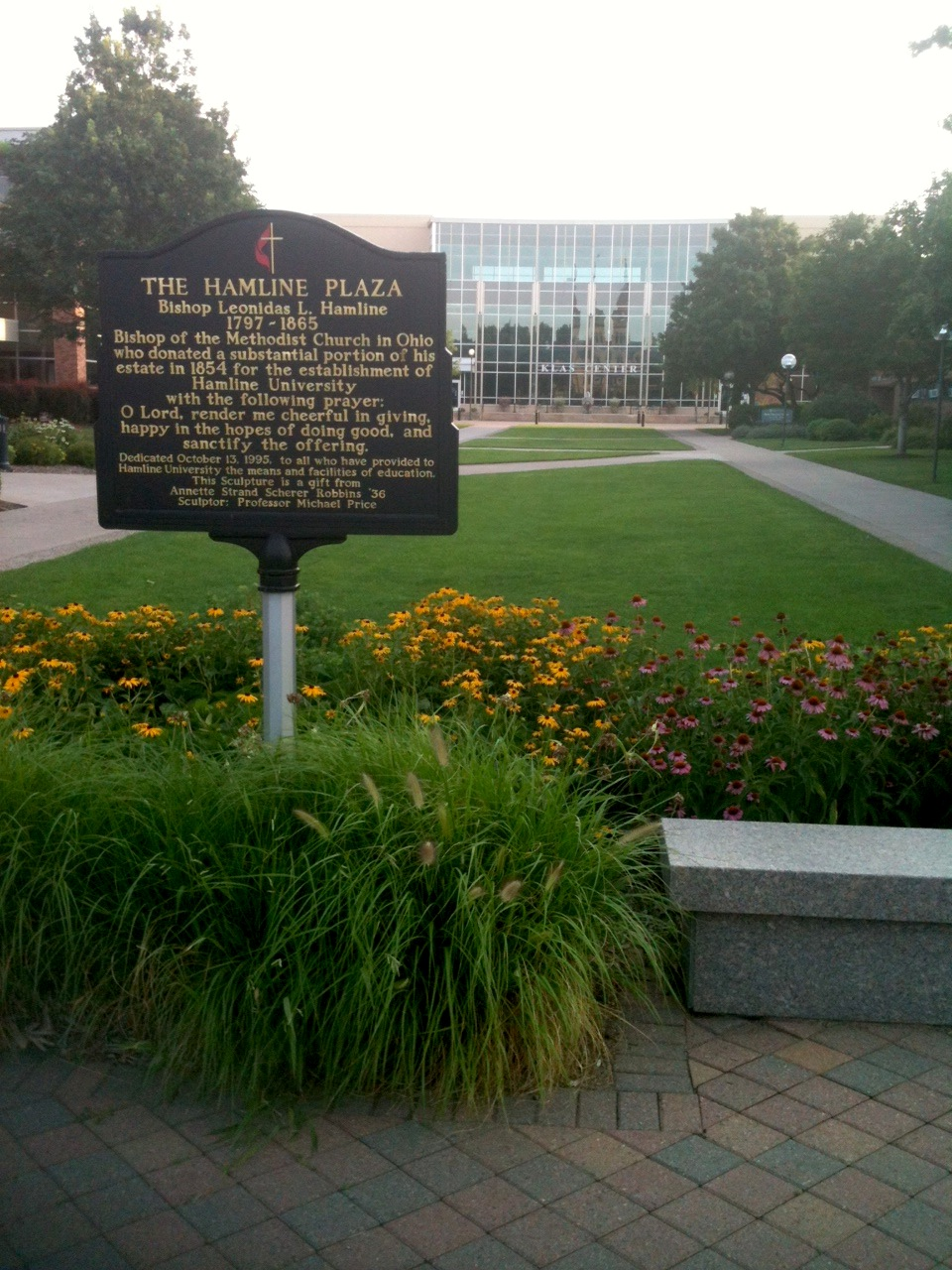
Hamline Plaza

Hamline broke ground on September 27, 1996, for the $5.6 million, 44,000-square-foot (4,100 m^{2}) Law and Graduate Center/Conference Center, which was dedicated on October 10, 1997. Hamline began construction on a $7.7 million student apartment building at 1470 Englewood for 142 graduate and law students on September 2, 1998. The building was completed in 2000, in time for students to move in for the fall term.

After four years of planning, ground was broken on October 18, 1996, for an $8.5 million sports, recreation, and health complex—Lloyd W. D. Walker Fieldhouse—though construction did not begin until the following spring. The completed fieldhouse, at Snelling and Taylor, opened on September 10, 1998. Klas Center, a modern, $7.1 million multi-use facility which includes the football field and a track, was built in 2003 to replace the aging Norton Field.

As the campus was transformed by construction projects, attention turned to Hamline's roots in the summer of 1996. An archaeological dig headed by John McCarthy of the Institute of Minnesota Archaeology and anthropology professor Skip Messenger began at the site of Hamline's original building in Red Wing. The three-story brick building, constructed in 1855 and open in time for classes to begin in January 1856, closed in 1869 and was demolished in 1871. Since few records exist from that time, the exact location and dimensions of the original building were unknown until the archaeological dig. The dig found that the original building's foundation was insufficient for its size, leading to speculation that structural problems might have contributed to the building's closing and eventual demolition.

=== 21st century controversies ===
In the autumn of 2012, Hamline students and faculty protested the school's refusal to condemn the proposed Minnesota constitutional amendment that would have banned equal marriage rights for all citizens. Hamline's attempt to stay neutral on the issue was seen as inconsistent with the university's anti-discrimination policy and its espoused values of diversity and inclusiveness, as well as with its United Methodist heritage and identity, since the Minnesota Annual Conference of the United Methodist Church had voted to publicly oppose the amendment. In June 2014, Hamline's adjunct professors voted to form a union as part of the SEIU, making Hamline the first private university in Minnesota where adjunct faculty formed a union. On July 1, 2015, Fayneese Miller became the first African American to be the President of Hamline University and the second woman to hold that office.

==== Teacher fired over Muhammad art ====
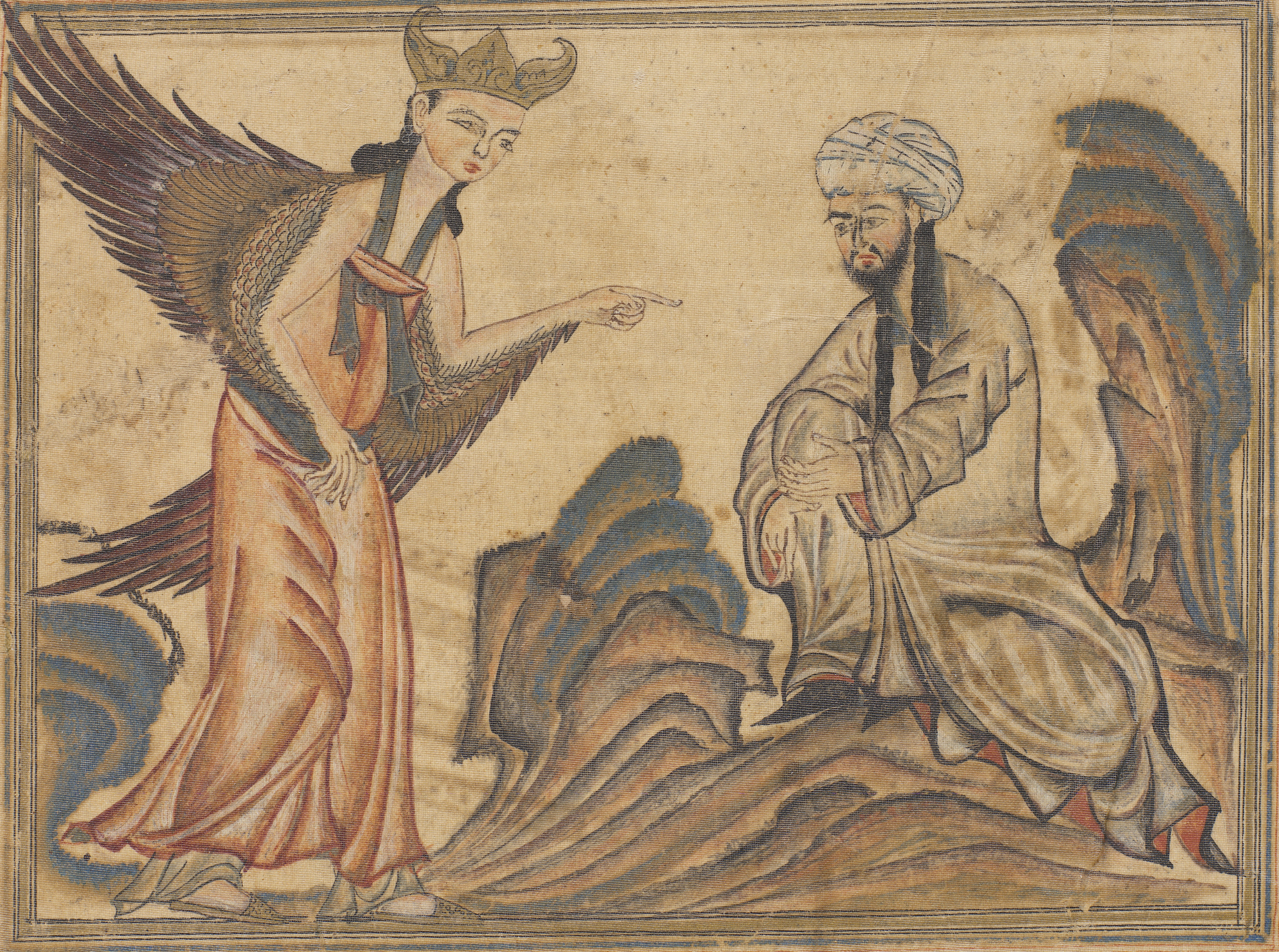
One of the images shown, depicting an angel and Muhammad

In October 2022, a few students—led by the president of the university's Muslim Students Association's chapter—accused an adjunct professor of harboring "Islamophobia" for showing paintings of the Islamic prophet Muhammad in a class on the history of Islamic art. The professor had informed the students of the nature of the images in the syllabus issued at the beginning of the semester, provided trigger warnings for days before the class, and even provided a disclaimer right before displaying the slides, allowing students to skip the particular lesson. Despite these, the students chose to attend the lesson, mainly motivated by the unusual trigger warning.

Notwithstanding an apology from the professor to the students and the entire class, the university administration declined to renew her contract and, a month later, publicly characterized her use of the paintings as "undeniably inconsiderate, disrespectful, and Islamophobic", and "unacceptable". In the next few days, while the Dean of Students classified the professor's teaching as "an act of intolerance", President Fayneese Miller cautioned all Hamline employees that "respect for the observant Muslim students should have superseded academic freedom."

Academics criticized Hamline's approach to academic freedom and their understanding of Islam as a monolith which was uniformly condemning the paintings, ignoring that Muslim rulers commissioned them; art historians characterized the paintings to be an indispensable component of any lesson on Islamic art history. Free speech groups have taken a similar stance—PEN America labeled the termination as "one of the most egregious violations of academic freedom in recent memory", while the Foundation for Individual Rights and Expression circulated a letter in support of the instructor; it amassed over 400 signatures from faculty members of American and international institutions. Scholars have also highlighted how the increasing commercialization of higher education with little security for adjunct faculties allowed for such firings. In addition, prominent Muslim advocacy organizations, including the Council on American–Islamic Relations and the Muslim Public Affairs Council, issued statements rejecting charges of Islamophobia against the professor.

In January 2023, the professor sued the university for religious discrimination and defamation; shortly after, President Miller withdrew her accusations of Islamophobia and acknowledged error in subordinating academic freedom to mainstream Islamic norms. A week later, most of the university's tenured faculty requested Miller's resignation. In April, Miller announced her intent to retire in June 2024.

== Schools and colleges ==
=== College of Liberal Arts ===
The College of Liberal Arts houses Hamline's undergraduate programs. College of Liberal Arts students can earn a Bachelor of Arts or Bachelor of Science degree in 41 areas of study. Hamline is one of 276 Phi Beta Kappa institutions in the country. Students may also minor in 38 areas of study within the college. All students complete an internship, collaborative research, a service learning project, or field-based research.

The undergraduate student to faculty ratio is 12:1 and the median class size is 18. Almost all (94%) faculty hold the highest degree in their fields.

Hamline competes in 20 intercollegiate sports in the NCAA Division III Minnesota Intercollegiate Athletic Conference. In addition to sports, Hamline has more than 70 clubs and organizations. Hamline also has an alliance with Hamline Elementary School, which is a public elementary located across the street from the university.

=== School of Education ===
Hamline University's School of Education houses graduate and undergraduate programs. For undergraduates, Hamline students pursue a BA or BS degree in the liberal arts, combined with a co-major in education and a Minnesota teaching license. Hamline has six graduate programs in education, including a doctorate in education, and professional development opportunities for educators than any other private institution in Minnesota.

The school offers the following programs:

- Co-Major in Education
- Master of Arts in Education
- Master of Arts in Education: Natural Science & Environmental Education
- Master of Arts in English as a Second Language
- Master of Arts in Literacy Education
- Master of Arts in Teaching
- Doctorate in Education

=== The Creative Writing Program ===
Hamline offers three fine arts degrees in creative writing: the BFA, an MFA in Creative Writing, and a low-residency MFA in Writing for Children and Young Adults. Hamline's Bachelor of Fine Arts in Creative Writing is the only such degree in the Twin Cities and the only one in the state of Minnesota offered by a private liberal arts university.

=== Hamline University School of Business ===
Hamline University School of Business contains both the undergraduate and graduate business programs. The undergraduate program offers a Bachelor of Business Administration (B.B.A.) and Bachelor of Arts in economics. The school offers minors in business analytics, business practice, economics, management, and nonprofit management.

Hamline School of Business graduate program offers the following degrees:

- Master in Business Administration
- Master in Nonprofit Management
- Master in Public Administration
- Doctorate in Public Administration

== Rankings ==
Academic rankings

Master's
- Washington Monthly: 27

Regional
- U.S. News & World Report: 12

National
- Forbes: 355

In 2021, Hamline was ranked 15th in the Midwest among "Master's universities" according U.S. News & World Report magazine's "Best Colleges" edition. Washington Monthly ranked Hamline first in Minnesota and 36th nationwide in its Master's Universities category in 2020. Hamline also made the publication's Best Bang for the Buck – Midwest Colleges list.

== Student life ==
Hamline students have the opportunity to partake in various on-campus activities. All clubs, intramural teams, and student events are run through the Student Affairs Division. Hamline's clubs include organizations with focuses on various academic subjects, the arts, journalism, culture, advocacy/social justice, recreation, and spirituality. Hamline also has two Greek organizations: Delta Tau sorority and Theta Chi fraternity, both of which are located a block west of campus. The two largest on-campus organizations are the Hamline Undergraduate Student Congress (HUSC) and Hamline University Programming Board (HUPB).

HUSC is the governing body of the undergraduate students, with the stated purpose of providing an organized medium for expressing student concerns to the administration. It is also responsible for overseeing and funding the majority of student organizations on campus. HUPB plans student events, such as the homecoming dance, End of the Semester Party, and the annual lip sync contest.

=== Residence halls and dining ===
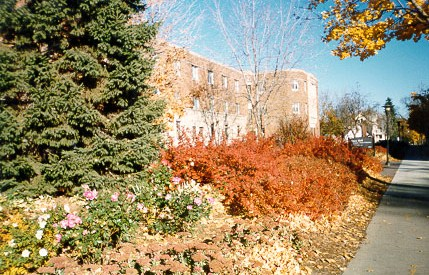
Drew Residence Hall in the autumn

Drew Hall houses 200 undergraduate men and women. The hall is staffed by resident advisors on each floor, an assistant hall director and one area coordinator. Drew was built in 1946 as a men's residence after a donation by Charles M. Drew.

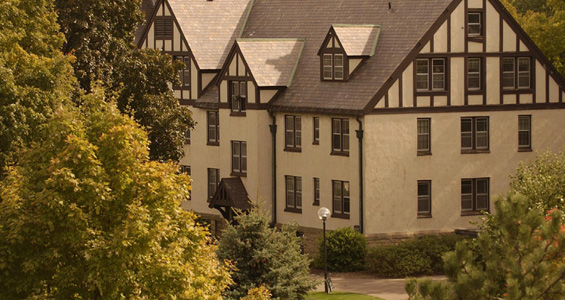
Hamline University's Manor Hall

Manor Hall is the oldest dormitory on the campus. It was built in 1922 as a women's dormitory, although today it is co-ed. Manor is home to second-, third- and fourth-year undergraduates.

Sorin Hall was built in 1958 and houses just over 100 men and women on single-gender floors, including two female floors and one male floor.

Osborn, Peterson and Schilling Residence Halls collectively known as the Heights, are identical buildings built in the late 1960s. Each houses nearly 100 first-year men and women.

The primary dining hall is located in The Carol Young Anderson and Dennis L. Anderson Center, often referred to as Anderson. The facility is operated by a private food management firm, ARAMARK. The dining hall is all-you-can-eat, charging a flat rate for entry, regardless of how much food is consumed. Meal plans are available for students. Included in the purchase of a meal plan is a certain amount of money that can be used at other facilities on campus ("declining balance" dollars). This money can be spent by using the student ID card like a debit card.

=== Newspaper and other publications ===
Hamline's student newspaper is The Oracle. It was founded in 1888 and has been published regularly ever since. The paper began as a monthly journal of letters and evolved into a weekly college newspaper. The Oracle receives its funding from and is published by the Student Media Board, which serves as an umbrella organization for the Liner, the university's yearbook, the Fulcrum, the university's literary magazine, and Hamline University Radio.

== Athletics ==
Hamline athletics logo

Hamline athletics teams are nicknamed the Pipers. The University is a member of the NCAA Division III Minnesota Intercollegiate Athletic Conference (MIAC).

=== Men's basketball ===
Hamline University is regarded as the "birthplace of intercollegiate basketball" and home to the first recorded basketball game played between two colleges. In 1894, then-athletic director (and student) Ray Kaighn, who had played on James Naismith's first basketball team, brought the sport to the university after Naismith devised rules for the game in December 1891. A women's program was organized the next year. On February 9, 1895, Hamline hosted the first intercollegiate basketball game in history, when the Minnesota State School of Agriculture (now the St. Paul campus of the University of Minnesota) defeated Hamline by a score of 9–3. The game was played in the basement of the university's old science building using Naismith's original "peach basket" rules, and featured nine players to each side.

Hamline was once known for the strength of its basketball program, with the university considered to be a national power in the sport from the 1930s to the 1950s. Hamline produced a number of NBA players during this time, including Hall of Famer Vern Mikkelsen. Then-head coach Joe Hutton Sr. (1931–1965) was once offered and turned down a chance to coach the Minneapolis Lakers, though his son later played for the team.

Hutton Arena, the home court for the Piper basketball and volleyball teams, was built in 1937. Originally named Norton Field House, it was renamed after Hutton. A statue of the coach is in the lobby of the building.

Hamline appeared in the NAIA national tournament 12 times from 1940 to 1960 Hamline is one of 3 schools to place 4th (1940) 3rd (1948) 2nd (1953) and 1st (1942,1949,1951). They were the first school to win three National Championships, consecutively or non-consecutively. Their NAIA tournament record is 36–10.

- NAIA National Champions: 1942, 1949 and 1951
- NAIA runners-up: 1953
- NAIA Third Place: 1948
- NAIA Semifinalist: 1940
- NAIA Tournament Appearances: 1940-42-43-47-48-49-50-51-52-53-57-60
- NCAA Division III Semifinalist: 1977 (Finished in fourth place)
- NCAA Division III Quarterfinalist: 1975
- NCAA Division III All-Tournament Selection: Phil Smyczek, 1977
- NCAA Division III Academic All-Americans: Paul Westling, 1986; John Banovetz, 1989
- CoSIDA Academic All-Americans: Liz Stock, 2011 (1st Team); Courtney Benson, 2014 (1st team); Mary-Clare Couillard (2015 third team, 2016 second team)
- Hamline University is a member of the Minnesota Intercollegiate Athletic Conference (MIAC).

=== Conference championships ===
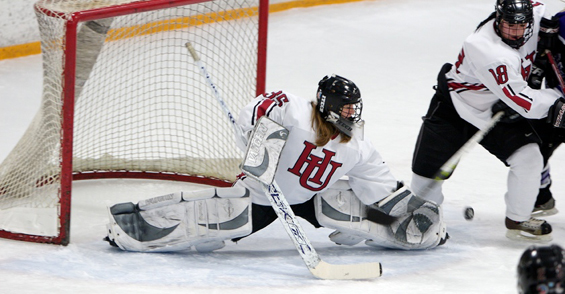
Hamline University women's ice hockey

This table displays the number of Minnesota Intercollegiate Athletic Conference (MIAC) conference championships that have been won by Hamline sports teams. If a sport is not listed, then a championship has not been won in that competition. Hamline fields teams in the following men's sports: baseball, basketball, cross country, football, ice hockey, indoor track and field, soccer, swimming and diving, tennis, and outdoor track & field. Hamline also fields teams in the following women's sports: basketball, cross country, ice hockey, indoor track and field, soccer, softball, gymnastics, swimming and diving, tennis, outdoor track and field, volleyball, and lacrosse. Women's lacrosse was added as an official Hamline University sport and the team officially competing in the spring of 2016. All records were compiled from the MIAC website and are up to date as of May 2017. In gymnastics, Hamline competes in the Wisconsin Intercollegiate Athletic Conference. In lacrosse, Hamline is a member of the Midwest Women's Lacrosse Conference.

Men's sports	Titles	Last title
Baseball	2	2011
Basketball	19	1959–60
Cross country	7	2011
Football	5	1988
Golf	2	1948
Men's ice hockey	6	2015
Swimming and diving	7	1978–79
Tennis	5	1964
Outdoor track and field	14	1982

Women's sports	Titles	Last title
Swimming and diving	4	1985–86
Lacrosse	2	2018
Women's ice hockey	1	2017–18

== Notable alumni ==
=== Politicians/public servants ===
- Patricia Anderson – Minnesota state auditor and mayor of Eagan, Minnesota
- Matt Bostrom – sheriff of Ramsey County
- Burnett M. Chiperfield – member of U.S. House of Representatives representing Illinois
- Alan D. Clemmons – member of South Carolina House of Representatives
- Tom Dooher – president of Education Minnesota, AFT, NEA, AFL–CIO
- Bill Frenzel – member of U.S. House of Representatives representing Minnesota
- Barb Goodwin – member of Minnesota State Senate
- Anna Arnold Hedgeman – civil rights leader and Hamline's first African-American graduate
- Gordon Hintz – member of Wisconsin State Assembly
- Yi Gang – Governor of the People's Bank of China and former director of the State Administration of Foreign Exchange
- Christine Jax – commissioner of education Minnesota Department of Education
- Martin Maginnis – member of U.S. House of Representatives
- Carly Melin – member in the Minnesota House of Representatives
- John J. Mertens – member of the South Dakota House of Representatives and the South Dakota Senate
- Adolphus Peter Nelson – member of U.S. House of Representatives representing Wisconsin
- Anthony Sertich – Majority Leader of Minnesota House of Representatives
- Heidi Swank – member of the Nevada State Assembly
- Van Tran – member of the California State Assembly
- Kerry Trask – candidate for Wisconsin State Assembly
- Oscar Youngdahl – member of U.S. House of Representatives

=== Athletes, sportspersons ===
- Duane Benson – professional football player
- Logan Clark – professional mixed martial artist and college football player for Hamline University
- Earl Cramer – professional football player
- Lew Drill – professional baseball player
- Hal Haskins - professional basketball player
- Joe Hutton Jr. – professional basketball player
- Raymond Kaighn – organizer of the first intercollegiate basketball game. Basketball Hall of Fame (1959) as a player on Naismith's First Team.
- Vern Mikkelsen – professional basketball player
- Marty Norton – professional football player
- Dave Peterson - coach of the United States men's national ice hockey team
- Howie Schultz – professional basketball

=== Actors, directors, playwrights, authors ===
- Jen Boyles - Writer, editor and digital media CEO
- Coleen Gray – film and television actress
- Trung Le Nguyen – author and illustrator
- Utica Queen – drag queen, reality star, and fashion designer
- Clinton Sundberg – film and theatre actor
- David Wesely – game designer. Created Braunstein, an early influence of Dungeons & Dragons.
- Francine York – actress and model

=== Academics ===
- John Bessler – professor of law and husband of U.S. Senator Amy Klobuchar
- Arthur Gillette – surgeon and namesake of Gillette Children's Specialty Healthcare
- John Kenneth Hilliard – academic and Academy Award recipient
- Robert LeFevre – libertarian theorist
- Madonna Harrington Meyer - Laura J. and L. Douglas Meredith Professor of Teaching Excellence, and Professor of Sociology at Syracuse University
- Deane Montgomery – prominent mathematician and recipient of the Leroy P. Steele Prize
- Leslie Rogne Schumacher - professor of international relations at Harvard Kennedy School
- Virginia Seay – composer and musicologist

=== Business and finance ===
- Max Winter – former part-owner of Minneapolis Lakers and Minnesota Vikings

=== Veterans ===
- Robert M. Hanson – Medal of Honor recipient
- Edwin W. Rawlings – General in the United States Air Force

=== Religious leaders ===
- James Newbury FitzGerald – former Methodist Episcopal bishop
- Lester Mondale – former Humanist and Unitarian and only person to sign all three Humanist Manifestos
- D. Paul Rader – early radio evangelist and hymn composer. Credited as being the first televangelist to preach to a nationwide audience

== See also ==
- List of colleges and universities in Minnesota
- Higher education in Minnesota
