= Isaac William Wiley =

American physician

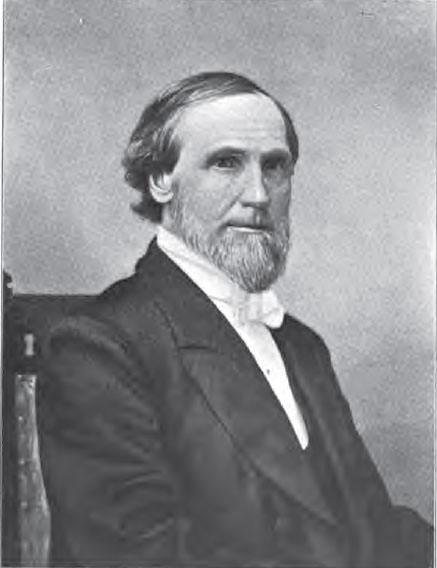
- Bishop of the Methodist Episcopal Church
- Born: March 29, 1824; Lewistown, Pennsylvania, United States
- Died: November 22, 1884 (aged 59); Fuzhou, China

Isaac William Wiley (simplified Chinese: 怀礼; traditional Chinese: 懷禮; Pinyin: Huáilǐ; Foochow Romanized: Huài-lā̤; 29 March 1825 – 22 November 1884) was an American who distinguished himself as a medical doctor, a Methodist missionary to China, a pastor, as the president of a seminary, as an editor, and as a bishop of the Methodist Episcopal Church, elected in 1872.

== Birth and early years ==
Isaac was born 29 March 1825 in Lewistown, Pennsylvania. He joined the Methodist Episcopal Church at ten years of age.

== Education ==
Isaac had been preparing to enter the sophomore class at Dickinson College, but the affection of his throat being considered permanent, he commenced the study of medicine, instead. He was graduated in 1846 from the medical department of the University of New York. He pursued a course of classical study in the same institution.

== Medical missionary ==
Dr. Isaac Wiley commenced the practice of medicine in Western Pennsylvania, subsequently moving to Pottsville in 1849. Shortly thereafter, at the request of Dr. Durbin, Isaac agreed to go as a medical missionary to Fuzhou, China.

Isaac first was received into the ministry of the Genesee Annual Conference of the M.E. Church. He also attended an additional course of lectures in the University of New York. Finally, he sailed for China, March 1850, transferring his conference membership to the Philadelphia Conference.

== Pastoral, academic, and editorial ministries ==
The Rev. Dr. Wiley returned from China in May 1854. He then was appointed to fill a pastoral vacancy on Staten Island. In 1855 he transferred his conference membership again, this time to the Newark Annual Conference. He was successively appointed to Newark and then Jersey City.

In 1858 the Rev. Dr. Wiley took charge of the Pennington Seminary. He served this position until 1863. In 1864 he was elected editor of the Ladies' Repository, an important periodical of his denomination. He was re-elected to this position in 1868. While editor, he also edited books for the M.E. Book Concern.

== Episcopal ministry ==
The Rev. Dr. Isaac William Wiley was elected to the episcopacy of the Methodist Episcopal Church by the General Conference of 1872. As bishop he was one of the founders of Wiley College, the first and oldest historically Black college west of the Mississippi River, located in Marshall, Texas. Wiley College was founded by the Methodist Episcopal Church in 1873 and chartered by the Freedman's Aid Society of the M.E. Church in 1882 for the purpose of providing education to the "newly freed men" (following emancipation and the American Civil War), preparing them for a new life.

Bishop Wiley traveled extensively to the various U.S. States and Territories. In 1877 he made an extensive tour in support of the M.E. missions in Japan and China.

Bishop Wiley died in Fuzhou, China, 22 November 1884. The funeral services took place the next day at Tieng Ang Tong.

== Selected writings ==
- The Fallen Missionaries of Foo Chow.
- The Religion of the Family.
- China and Japan: a record of observations made during a residence of several years in China, and a tour of official visitation to the missions of both countries in 1877-78 (1879)

== See also ==
- List of bishops of the United Methodist Church
