= Matt Bostrom =

American sheriff

Matthew D. "Matt" Bostrom is an American former law enforcement official.

Bostrom began his law enforcement career as a police officer in the Saint Paul Police Department in 1982. He rose through the ranks becoming Assistant Chief of Support Services before his election to Ramsey County Sheriff.

From January 2011 to 2016 he served as the 21st Sheriff of Ramsey County, an urban county encompassing Saint Paul, and the state capital of Minnesota. He resigned in December 2016 in order to consult research police hiring at the University of Oxford's Centre for Criminology, a position which he had controversially taken on while still serving as Sheriff. Bostrom was elected Sheriff replacing four-term incumbent Bob Fletcher. Fletcher was ultimately reelected to the position following Bostrom's departure. He received a PhD in criminology from Oxford in 2020, and as of 2026 is the president of the Center for Values-Based Initiatives, which consults for law enforcement agencies.

Bostrom holds a Doctor of Public Administration degree from Hamline University. He authored "The Influence of Education on Police Officer Work Habits" and co-authored "The United States Department of Justice: Character-Based Police Officer Selection". Concurrent with his law enforcement roles, Bostrom was an adjunct professor at Saint Mary's University of Minnesota, University of Northwestern – St. Paul, and Hamline University.
