= Michael Price (sculptor) =

American sculptor

Michael Price (October 21, 1940 – May 5, 2001), was a 20th-century sculptor specializing in public art. His best known installation is his sculpture of F. Scott Fitzgerald, installed in 1996 in Rice Park, Saint Paul, Minnesota, to commemorate Fitzgerald's 100th birthday. The original head from this piece—replaced by Price prior to installation—can be seen at the end of the 2006 movie, A Prairie Home Companion.

== Biography ==
Price was born October 21, 1940, in Chicago, the second child of Louis, the inventor of the caramel popcorn machine, and Florence, a public school teacher. He grew up in the South Shore neighborhood of Chicago, graduating from Hyde Park High School in 1957. Price eventually earned his M.A. in Mathematics from the University of Illinois Urbana-Champaign in 1964, and then served in the U.S. Army. After his tour in the Army, he returned to school earned his M.F.A. in sculpture from Tulane University in 1968.

== Career ==
Price taught sculpture, drawing, and art history at Hamline University from 1970 until his death. and was chosen for inclusion in Hamline's "One Hundred and Fifty Lives that Make a Difference," published in 2005 to celebrate Hamline University's sesquicentennial. Price worked primarily in bronze, and used the lost-wax casting process to cast his pieces; he preferred to do his own casting. His work can be found in numerous installations in California, Illinois, Minnesota, Ohio, and Pennsylvania. His pieces have a human quality and tend to be approachable. They are often installed without a pedestal. When Price sculpted he not only relied on models, film, and photographs to capture a subject, but also read any available writings by or about the subject. Price thought this research helped him understand his subject better and create the approachable, human work he was known for. Price was also interested in sacred spaces.

== Installations ==
- John and Lydia Morris. Cast and Installed in 1981 at the Morris Arboretum of the University of Pennsylvania. Commissioned by Philip and Muriel Berman.
- Archbishop John Ireland. Installed in 1986 at the University of St. Thomas, St. Paul, Minnesota.
- Zacharius Ursinus. Installed 1983 at Ursinus College, Collegeville, Pennsylvania.
- Reclining Pregnant Woman. Installed 1983 at Ursinus College, Collegeville, Pennsylvania.
- Standing Adolescent. Installed in 1984 at Bloomsburg University, Bloomsburg, Pennsylvania.
- Seated Woman. Dedicated in 1987. Ursinus College, Collegeville, Pennsylvania.
- The Olivet Triptych. Installed August, 1987 at Olivet congregational Church, St. Paul, Minnesota.
- Captain Mary B. Green. Installed in 1988 at George Rogers Clark Park on the Covington Riverfront, Covington, Kentucky.
- Fallen Firefighters Memorial. Installed 1988 at West End Fire Department in Allentown, Pennsylvania.
- Jacob Albright. Installed January, 1991 at Albright College, Reading, Pennsylvania.
- Bishop Leonidas Hamline. Installed 1995 at Hamline University, St. Paul, Minnesota.
- F. Scott Fitzgerald. Installed 1996 in Rice Park, St. Paul, Minnesota.
- Four Panels and Fountain. Installed 2001 at University of Saint Thomas, St. Paul, Minnesota.
- Mother and Child. Installed 2005 at the Minnesota Landscape Arboretum, University of Minnesota. Gift of Earl and Lois Mosiman.
