= Madonna Harrington Meyer =

American sociologist and author

- Occupations: Sociologist, author, and academic

Academic background
- Education: B.A. in Sociology and Urban Studies; M.A. in Sociology; Ph.D. in Sociology
- Alma mater: Hamline University; University of Minnesota; Florida State University
- Thesis: Universalism vs. Targeting as a Basis of Social Distribution: Gender, Race, and Long-Term Care in the United States (1991)

Academic work
- Institutions: Syracuse University

Madonna Harrington Meyer is an American sociologist, author, and academic. She is a university professor at Syracuse University, Laura J. and L. Douglas Meredith Professor of Teaching Excellence, and Professor of Sociology at the Maxwell School of Citizenship and Public Affairs. She is a Senior Research Associate at the Center for Policy Research, Faculty Research Affiliate at the Lerner Center, and Faculty Affiliate at the Aging Studies Institute of Syracuse University.

Harrington Meyer's research interests include the fields of old age policies in the United States, the physical, emotional, social and financial impacts of grandparenting, and food insecurity in old age. She has authored and co-authored several books. Her most recent book, written with Colleen M. Heflin, is Food for Thought: Understanding Older Adult Food Insecurity (2025). She is author of one children’s book, Grandma’s Joy (2024). She is the author of Grandmothers at Work: Juggling Families and Jobs (2014), which won the Gerontological Society of America's Kalish Book Award. She is also the co-author of Grandparenting Children with Disabilities (2020) with Ynesse Abdul-Malak; co-editor of Grandparenting in the United States (2016) with Abdul-Malak; and co-editor of Gerontology: Changes, Challenges, and Solutions (2016) with Elizabeth Daniele. In addition, she is co-author with Pamela Herd of Market Friendly or Family Friendly? The State and Gender Inequality in Old Age (2007), which also won the Gerontological Society of America's Kalish Book Award and is editor of Care Work: Gender, Labor, and the Welfare State (2000).

Harrington Meyer is a Fellow of the Gerontological Society of America and a Member of the National Academy of Social Insurance.

== Education ==
Harrington Meyer obtained her Baccalaureate degree in Sociology and Urban Studies from Hamline University in 1981 and received a master's degree in sociology from the University of Minnesota. She then went on to complete her Ph.D. in sociology from Florida State University in 1991 with a thesis entitled, "Universalism vs. Targeting as a Basis of Social Distribution: Gender, Race, and Long Term Care in the United States".

== Career ==
Following her Ph.D., Harrington Meyer began her academic career as an assistant professor of sociology at the University of Illinois, Urbana, in 1991 and was promoted to associate professor. In 1997, she held the position of senior research associate at the Center for Policy Research and an associate professor at the Department of Sociology of Syracuse University and in 2005, she was promoted to professor. She serves as a Laura J. and L. Douglas Meredith Professor of Teaching Excellence and a University Professor of Sociology at the Maxwell School of Citizenship and Public Affairs. She is a faculty research affiliate at the Lerner Center, and a faculty affiliate at the Aging Studies Institute of Syracuse University.

Harrington Meyer has held administrative appointments throughout her career, including serving as director of graduate studies in the Department of Sociology, director of the Gerontology Center, and chair of the Department of Sociology at Syracuse University.

== Research ==
Harrington Meyer's research covers United States' old age policies, grandparenting, care work, and food insecurity. Her work has been covered by several media outlets, including The New York Times, The Boston Globe, U.S. News and World Report, San Francisco Chronicle, The Christian Science Monitor, LA Times, The Wall Street Journal, and The Atlantic. Harrington Meyer's research is published in numerous academic journals, including American Sociological Review, Journal of Health and Social Behavior, Social Problems, and Gender and Society.

=== Old age policies ===
Harrington Meyer's primary focus lies in addressing inequality linked to gender, race, class, and marital status among older people in the United States through an emphasis on the impact of various social policies. In her book, Market Friendly or Family Friendly? she and Pamela Herd analyzed the gendered nature of poverty and inequality among older populations, particularly focusing on women, and discussed potential policy solutions to address these disparities and create a more equitable future for older women. They explored how various long-term care policies and practices directly impact couples' well-being and elucidated that while many couples struggle with long-term care policies to exercise their rights in these arenas, unmarried couples face challenges that maybe are particularly difficult to overcome. In related research, she described the potential impact of declining marriage rates on the financial security of older women and the need for potential Social Security policy adjustments. She also examined the income, health, and functional capacity of older Florida residents who fall into the Medicaid gap and the challenges faced by their primary caregivers in a collaborative study and presented a Social Security minimum benefit plan that would provide a cost-effective method for reducing old age poverty to very low levels. She explored the gender and race distinctions between making Social Security claims as workers or wives for financial wellbeing in old age. With her colleague Eliza Pavalko, she examined the impact of marriage, care work, and employment on access to health insurance among middle-aged women. In addition, she addressed the dental care challenges faced by older adult Medicare and Medicaid recipients, particularly those from disadvantaged socioeconomic backgrounds, and proposed a solution involving the inclusion of dental care coverage within federal funding initiatives.

=== Grandparenting ===
Harrington Meyer's research has also highlighted the impact of grandparenting on the emotional, physical, social, and financial well-being of grandparents. In Grandmothers at Work, based on interviews with 48 working grandmothers, she explored how they juggled paid work and unpaid family care work and the impact on their wellbeing. In the Journal of Elderly Policy, she examined how increasing childhood disability rates in the US lead to extensive grandparent caregiving, highlighting challenges related to employment benefits, social assistance programs, and disability policies, and underscoring the impact on grandparents' well-being.

In her book Grandmothers at Work: Juggling Families and Jobs, Harrington Meyer explored the experiences of middle-aged American women who navigate the demands of their careers while providing childcare for their grandchildren, highlighting challenges such as financial adjustments, postponed retirements, and complex caregiving responsibilities. Heather E. Dillaway reviewed the book and mentioned, "Meyer presents the reader with data about how exactly continuous women's caregiving can be across the life course". The book covers the impact of grandmothers in building families, a point commended by Carole Cox in her book review. She stated, "with grandmothers playing dominant roles in families, this book underscores the commitment, dedication, and even sacrifices that they make." Loriena (Lori) Yancura highlighted another aspect of the book: the United States' family-friendly policies and emphasized that "This book makes repeated mention of the fact that grandmothers providing part-time care for their grandchildren would not be as burdened if the United States had more family-friendly work policies, such as flexible work schedules and paid sick leave."

In her book, Grandparenting in the United States, co-edited with Abdul-Malak, she inspected diverse aspects of grandparenting using various data sets, analyzing how factors like living arrangements, economic status, ethnicity, and more impact grandparenting experiences, including financial assistance, cultural expectations, childcare roles, and intergenerational impacts. Additionally, she analyzed the impact of COVID-19 on the lives of working grandmothers and how sociodemographic changes and the impact of the COVID-19 pandemic are reshaping grandparenting in the United States, emphasizing the need for supportive social welfare programs to alleviate the reliance on grandparents for childcare and financial assistance. Moreover, in her book Grandparenting Children with Disabilities, based on interviews with 50 grandparents who are caring for grandchildren with disabilities, she and Abdul-Malak assessed the effects of caring for and supporting grandchildren with disabilities on grandparents' social, emotional, physical, and financial well-being. Her children’s book, Grandma’s Joy is based her research on grandparenting and displays the joy of grandparents and grandchildren spending time together.

=== Food insecurity ===
Harrington Meyer has devoted much of the last decade to work on food insecurity in old age. Food for Thought: Understanding Older Adult Food Insecurity (2025), written with Colleen M. Heflin, is one of the first books to focus on the growing prevalence of food insecurity among US older adults. Based on analysis of national data sets and original data collected in interviews with 63 low-income older adults, the book provides an exploration of the causes, consequences, and solutions to food insecurity for older adults in the US. In related work, she and her colleague, Winston Scott explored how food pantries can be made more user friendly for older adults. Additionally, Harrington Meyer and her colleague Anna De La Paz examined how caring for grandchildren contributes to food insecurity among residential and nonresidential grandparents.

In comments about Food for Thought: Understanding Older Adult Food Insecurity by Colleen M Heflin and Madonna Harrington Meyer, Professor Kames P. Ziliak of the University of Kentucky has written, “[They] provide the most comprehensive mixed-methods analysis of food insecurity facing older adults to date. The detailed descriptive data are expertly complemented with rich contextual experiences of those seniors facing food hardship in their daily lives. The authors offer keen insights into the policy environment these vulnerable seniors must navigate and present a set of provocative recommendations to improve federal state and local policies.”

Professor Kathy Edin of Princeton University has written, “[They] lift the veil on an unfolding crisis in America but one that is hidden from view. Simply put, as America ages, more and more of our fellow citizens will reach retirement age only to find that they must embark on a perilous quest just to get enough food to eat. With precision, the authors describe the myriad dimensions of the crisis and the multiple failures of both public and private strategies to address it to date.”

Professor Tim Smeeding of the University of Wisconsin Madison has written, “This book combines the immense talents of two well-known scholars, one who studies aging and the other who studies food insecurity, stressing the importance of consistent access to a nutritious diet to maintain health and old age. The result is an imminently readable, understandable, and fact-filled volume about the seven million older adults in the United States who are food insecure. There are rich descriptions of how financial problems lead to competing claims on founds, with food often losing out to medicine or housing costs among older Americans. Food for Thought soberly assesses the limits to feeding programs, food-support programs, and income-support programs, concluding that many cost-effective policies could help seniors…”

== Selected awards and honors ==
- 1993 – John Heinz Dissertation Award, the National Academy of Social Insurance
- 1997 – Jessie Bernard Outstanding Contribution to Feminist Scholarship Paper Award, National Council on Family Relations
- 2004 – Fellow, Gerontological Society of America
- 2007 – Richard Kalish Book Award, Gerontological Society of America
- 2014 – Richard Kalish Book Award, Gerontological Society of America
- 2016 – Matilda White Riley Distinguished Scholar Award, American Sociological Association

== Bibliography ==
=== Selected books ===
- Food for Thought: Understanding Older Adult Food Insecurity, (2025) with Colleen M. Heflin, Russel Sage Foundation. Food for Thought | Russell Sage Foundation.
- Grandma’s Joy, (2024) Palmetto Publisher,
- Grandparenting Children with Disabilities, with Ynesse Abdul-Malak (2020) ISBN 978-3-030-39054-9
- Grandparenting in the United States (2016). Madonna Harrington Meyer and Ynesse Abdul-Malak, editors. Amityville, NY: Baywood Press.
- Gerontology: Changes, Challenges, and Solutions (2016), Madonna Harrington Meyer and Elizabeth A. Daniele, editors, Santa Barbara, CA: Praeger Publishing.
- Grandmothers at Work: Juggling Families and Jobs (2014) ISBN 978-0-8147-2947-2
- Market Friendly or Family Friendly? The State and Gender Inequality in Old Age, with Pamela Herd (2007) ISBN 978-0-87154-598-5
- Care Work: Gender, Labor, and the Welfare State (2000) Madonna Harrington Meyer, editor. New York, NY: Routledge Press.
