= The Ladies' Repository =

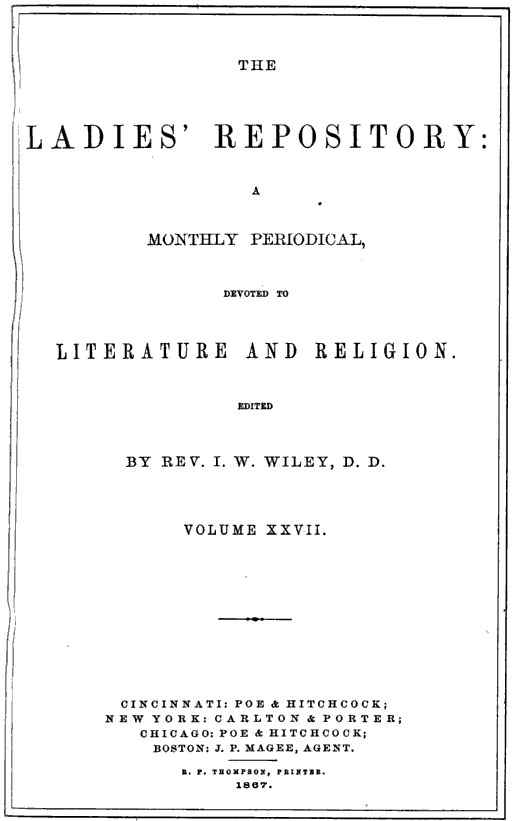
- Front page of vol. 27, 1867
- Editor: See below
- Categories: Christian magazines
- Frequency: Monthly
- Publisher: Methodist Episcopal Church
- First issue: January 1841
- Final issue: December 1876
- Country: USA
- Based in: Cincinnati, Ohio
- Language: English

The Ladies' Repository was a monthly periodical based in Cincinnati and produced by members of the Methodist Episcopal Church. From 1841 to 1876, the magazine devoted itself to literature, arts and doctrines of Methodism, containing articles, poetry, fictions, engravings, and notes of interest to its readers.

== Editors ==
- 1841 – 1844: Leonidas Lent Hamline
- 1844 – 1846: Edward Thomson
- 1846 – 1852: Benjamin Tefft
- 1852 – 1853: William Clark Larrabee
- 1853 – 1863: Davis Wasgatt Clark
- 1864 – 1872: Isaac William Wiley
- 1872 – 1876: Erastus Wentworth
- 1876: Daniel Curry

== See also ==
- Early American Methodist Newspapers
