= Gilbert Haven =

American Methodist bishop (1821–1880)

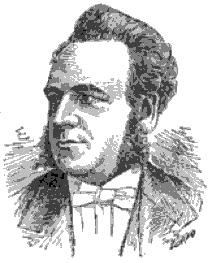
- Born: September 19, 1821; Malden, Massachusetts
- Died: January 3, 1880 (aged 58); Malden, Massachusetts
- Occupation: Clergyman
- Spouse: Mary Ingraham (m. 1851; died 1861)

Gilbert Haven (September 19, 1821 – January 3, 1880) was a bishop of the Methodist Episcopal Church, elected in 1872. He was consecrated a bishop on May 24, 1872 at the Brooklyn Academy of Music in New York. He was an early benefactor of Clark College (now Clark Atlanta University), visualizing it as a university of all the Methodist schools founded for the education of freedmen (former African American slaves). He succeeded Bishop Davis Wasgatt Clark (for whom Clark College was named) as the President of the Freedman's Aid Society of the Methodist Episcopal Church.

Rest Haven is a historically black section for burials in Atlanta's Westview Cemetery named after Haven.

== Biography ==
Gilbert Haven was born in Malden, Massachusetts on September 19, 1821. He married Mary Ingraham in 1851; she died ten years later. They had two children, one of whom, William, served for 29 years as the general secretary of the American Bible Society.

In 1846 he graduated with honors from Wesleyan University and then taught Greek and Latin. He traveled widely, visiting the Holy Land, Africa, Mexico and Europe, and was an early proponent of equality of the sexes. He became a member of the New England Annual Conference in 1851, and served as bishop in Atlanta to a conference composed entirely of African Americans. When in Liberia in 1877, he contacted malaria, from which he never fully recovered. He died in Malden on the evening of January 3, 1880.

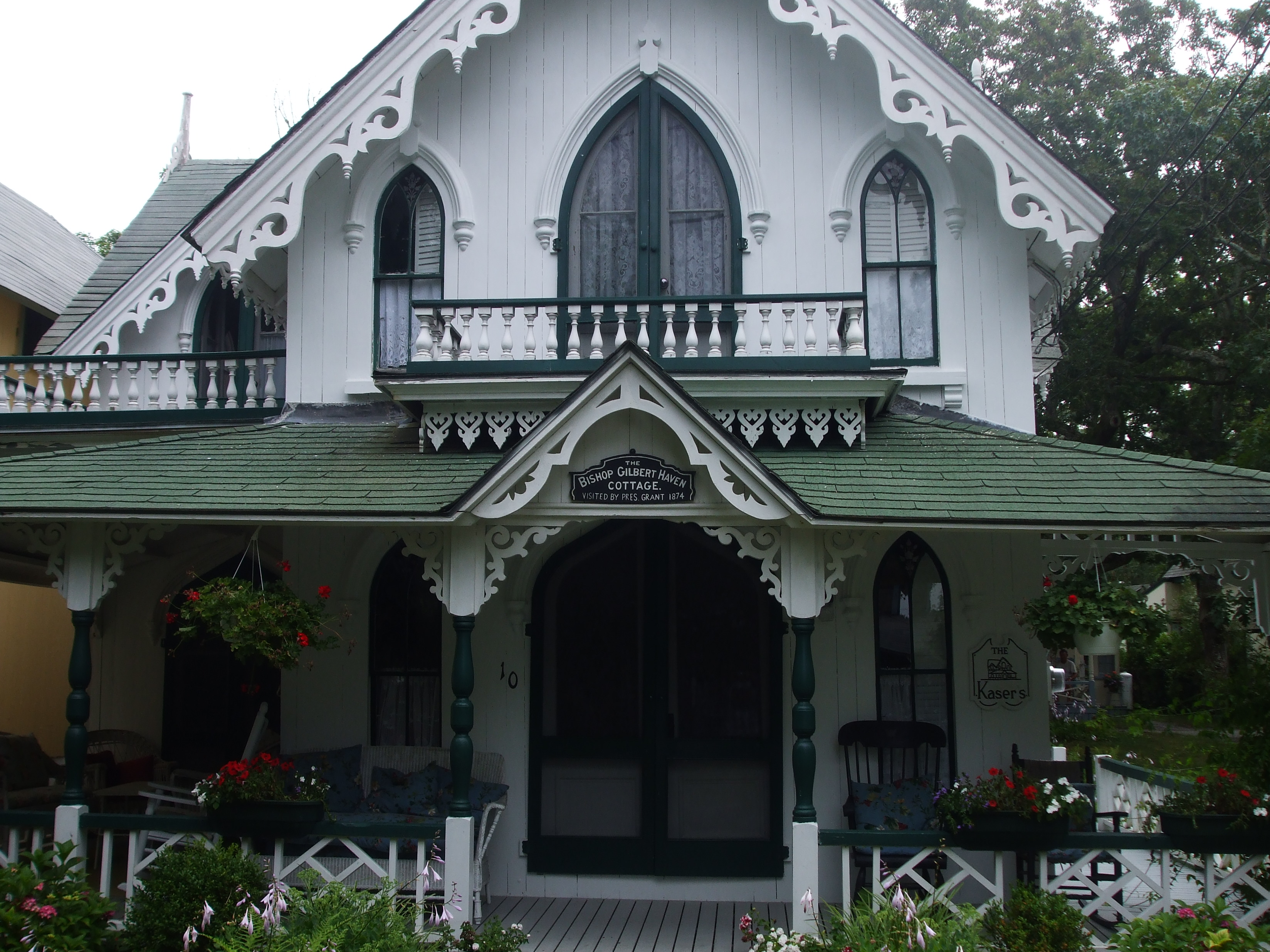
Bishop Gilbert Haven cottage; Oak Bluffs, Martha's Vineyard

He believed in the absolute equality of all persons, and if they are equal in the eyes of God, he held that civil society would have to recognize their equality under law and in practice. He was absolutely opposed to the practice of any type of racial separation in churches. Due to his radical egalitarian views, shocking at the time, no Northern conference would have him as a bishop—hence, his appointment to an all black mission conference.

Among the books he wrote were The Pilgrim's Wallet (1864) on travel; National Sermons (1869), Sermons, Speeches and Letters on Slavery and its War, and Life of Father Taylor.

After the Civil War he was editor of Zion's Herald, a weekly newspaper for New England's Methodists.

After his death Benjamin Tanner, editor of The Christian Recorder, wrote: "he was one of the few that made public opinion rather than followed it; and happily ... he made it on the side of the poor ... and the ostracized."

Bishop Haven is included in the Calendar of Saints prepared by the Order of Saint Luke and recommended for The United Methodist Church.

== See also ==
- Clark Atlanta University
- List of bishops of the United Methodist Church
