= Clark Atlanta University =

Historically Black university in Atlanta, Georgia, US

- Motto: "I'll Find a Way or Make One" (Atlanta University); "Culture for Service" (Clark College)
- Type: Private historically black research university
- Established: September 19, 1865; 161 years ago
- Religious affiliation: United Methodist Church
- Academic affiliations: ORAU; Space-grant
- Endowment: $102.4 million (2021)
- President: George T. French Jr.
- Students: 4,135 (fall 2023)
- Undergraduates: 3,495 (fall 2023)
- Postgraduates: 640 (fall 2023)
- Location: Atlanta, Georgia, US; 33°45′3″N 84°24′37″W
- Campus: Urban, 126 acres (0.5 km^{2})
- Newspaper: The Panther
- Colors: Red, black, gray
- Nickname: Panthers
- Sporting affiliations: NCAA Division II, SIAC
- Mascot: Panther
- Website: cau.edu

Clark Atlanta University (CAU or Clark Atlanta) is a private, Methodist, historically black research university in Atlanta, Georgia, United States. It was founded on September 19, 1865, as Atlanta University, the first HBCU in the United States to confer graduate degrees to African Americans. In 1988, the school consolidated with Clark College (established 1869) to form CAU. It is classified among "R2: Doctoral Universities – High research activity".

== History ==
Atlanta University was founded on September 19, 1865, and was among the first HBCUs in the Southern United States. It holds the distinction of being the nation's first graduate institution to award degrees to African Americans and the first to award bachelor's degrees to African Americans in the South. Clark College, founded in 1869, was the nation's first four-year liberal arts college to serve African-American students. The two institutions consolidated in 1988 to form Clark Atlanta University.

=== Atlanta University ===
In the city of Atlanta, while the Civil War was well underway, two literate African American ex-slaves, James Tate and Grandison B. Daniels, in 1862 established the first school in Atlanta for African American children. It was located on the corner of Courtland and Jenkins Streets in a Baptist church building. Tate and Daniels, along with 25 other former slaves, founded Friendship Baptist Church. They began holding classes in a church building built in 1848. The school became Atlanta University in September 1865.

When white missionary Frederick Ayer, along with his wife, arrived in Atlanta in November 1865 under the auspices of the American Missionary Association, the AMA church purchased a boxcar for $310 (~$6,520 in 2025) in Chattanooga, Tennessee, and sent it to Friendship by the Ninth Street Baptist Church of Cincinnati, Ohio. The modest space of the boxcar served two purposes: a new teaching space for Atlanta University and a meeting space for the Friendship Church congregation. Tate and Daniels readily transferred their responsibilities to Ayer, who was better prepared to lead the educational effort, in 1865.

Atlanta University was founded on September 19, 1865, by James Tate and Grandison Daniels. Two years later, Edmund Asa Ware of the American Missionary Association was appointed the first president. Atlanta University was chartered in 1867 with the assistance from Oliver Otis Howard of the Freedmen's Bureau. He also appointed William J. White as educational agent of the Freedmen's Bureau on January 12, 1867. White was the half-brother of founder James Tate and was the co-founder of the Augusta Institute in 1867, which would become Morehouse College. He served as trustee of Atlanta University in 1869.

AU was chartered on October 17, 1867. It offered its first instruction at the postsecondary level in 1869. Its first graduating class was in 1873 (normal school for future teachers including women), and it awarded its first six bachelor's degrees in June 1876.

Atlanta University was among the first HBCUs to accept female students and the first to house women in a dormitory: its North Hall, built in 1869. One woman earned a bachelor's degree from Atlanta University between 1876 and 1895, but in the next five years, seven women received bachelor's degrees there. Atlanta University awarded bachelor's degrees 53 years (1876–1929) before exclusively offering graduate degrees.

A 1912 catalog shows that Atlanta University had four divisions: the college and the normal school, and each had a preparatory division. Enrollment that year was 403: 40 college students, 62 normal students, 115 high school students in the college prep program and 183 high school students in the normal program. At that time, half of the Atlanta University alumni were employed in teaching. There were a group of small Black colleges in Atlanta — Atlanta, Morehouse, Spelman, Clark, Morris Brown and Gammon — each guarding its independence but each dependent on Northern philanthropy. By the end of World War I, the Northern philanthropists were demanding mergers to improve educational quality. In 1929 the Atlanta University Affiliation was formed, and Atlanta University gained a new role as the graduate school, with Morehouse and Spelman as undergraduate colleges. Before World War II, the Affiliation came to include other Black colleges in Atlanta. On July 1, 1988, Atlanta University merged with Clark College, becoming Clark Atlanta University.

The Atlanta University campus was moved to its present site, and the modern organization of the Atlanta University Center emerged, with Clark College, Morris Brown College, and the Interdenominational Theological Center joining the affiliation later. Graduate Schools of Library Science, Education, and Business Administration were established in 1941, 1944, and 1946, respectively. The Atlanta School of Social Work, long associated with the university, gave up its charter in 1947 to become an integral part of the university. In 1957, the controlling boards of the six institutions (Atlanta University; Clark, Morehouse, Morris Brown and Spelman Colleges; and Gammon Theological Seminary) ratified new articles of affiliation. The new contract created the Atlanta University Center. The influence of Atlanta University has been extended through professional journals and organizations, including Phylon, and through the work of W. E. B. Du Bois, a member of the center.

The significance of Atlanta University Center rests in the quality of its leaders, faculty, and graduates. Edmund Asa Ware was Atlanta University's spiritual and intellectual father. His dedication to academic excellence and rejection of racial inferiority influenced other black colleges and American education in general. John Hope, former Morehouse president and Atlanta University's first black president, is noted in every history of American education during the first half of this century. Atlanta University's most famous faculty member (1897–1910) was Du Bois, who began the Atlanta Studies on Negro Sociology and later became the director of publications for the NAACP.

=== Clark College ===
Clark College was founded in 1869 by the Methodist Episcopal Church, which later became part of the United Methodist Church, as the nation's first four-year liberal arts college to serve the primarily African-American student population. Originally named Clark University, the school was chartered and incorporated in 1877. It first offered instruction at the postsecondary level in 1879, and awarded its first degree (baccalaureate) in 1880. It became Clark College in 1940. It was named for Bishop Davis Wasgatt Clark, who was the first President of the Freedman's Aid Society and became Bishop in 1864. A sparsely furnished room in Clark Chapel, a Methodist Episcopal church in Atlanta's Summerhill section, housed the first Clark College class. In 1871, the school relocated to a new site on the newly purchased Whitehall and McDaniel Street property. In 1877, the School was chartered as Clark University.

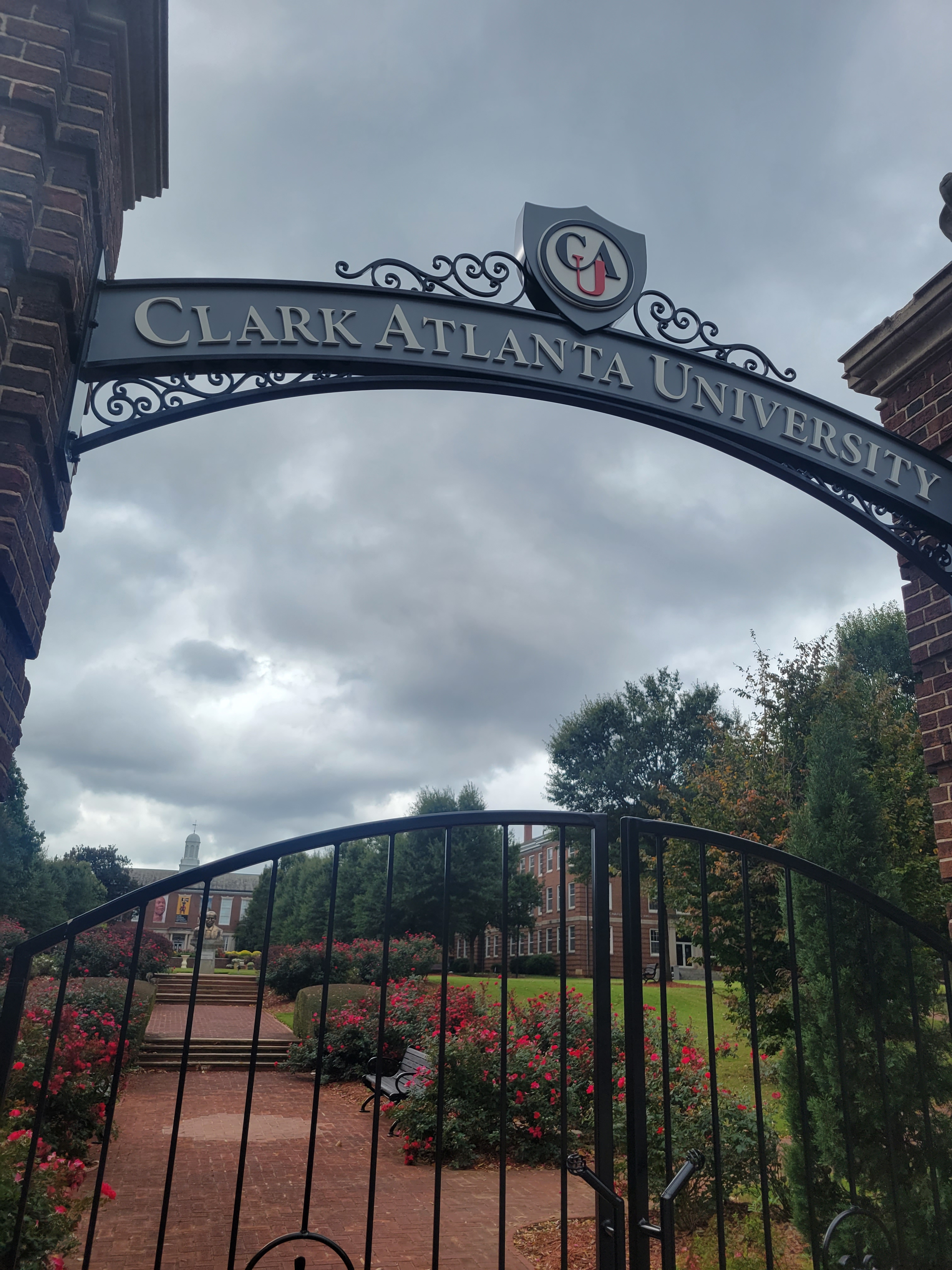
Clark Atlanta University sign

An early benefactor, Bishop Gilbert Haven, visualized Clark as the "university" of all the Methodist schools founded for the education of freedmen. After the school changed locations several times, Bishop Haven, who succeeded Bishop Clark, was instrumental in acquiring 450 acres (1.8 km^{2}) in South Atlanta, where in 1880 the school conferred its first degree. In 1883, Clark established a theology department named for Elijah H. Gammon. In 1888, the Gammon School of Theology became an independent theological seminary, and is currently part of the Interdenominational Theological Center. Clark College merged with Atlanta University on July 1, 1988, to form Clark Atlanta University.

=== Philanthropy ===
In December 2020, MacKenzie Scott donated $15 million (~$17.9 million in 2024) to Clark Atlanta University which is the second largest single gift in CAU's history. In November 2025, Scott donated an additional $38 million which is the largest single gift in CAU's history.

In September 2021, Clark Atlanta launched a 10-year $250 million capital campaign to raise scholarhips funds for more low-income students, advance research and teaching efforts, improve infrastructure and technology on campus, and to establish more endowment chairs and professorships.

== Presidents ==
Clark Atlanta University's current president is George T. French Jr., who started in 2019. He was preceded by Lucille H. Maugé, as acting president.

== Campus ==
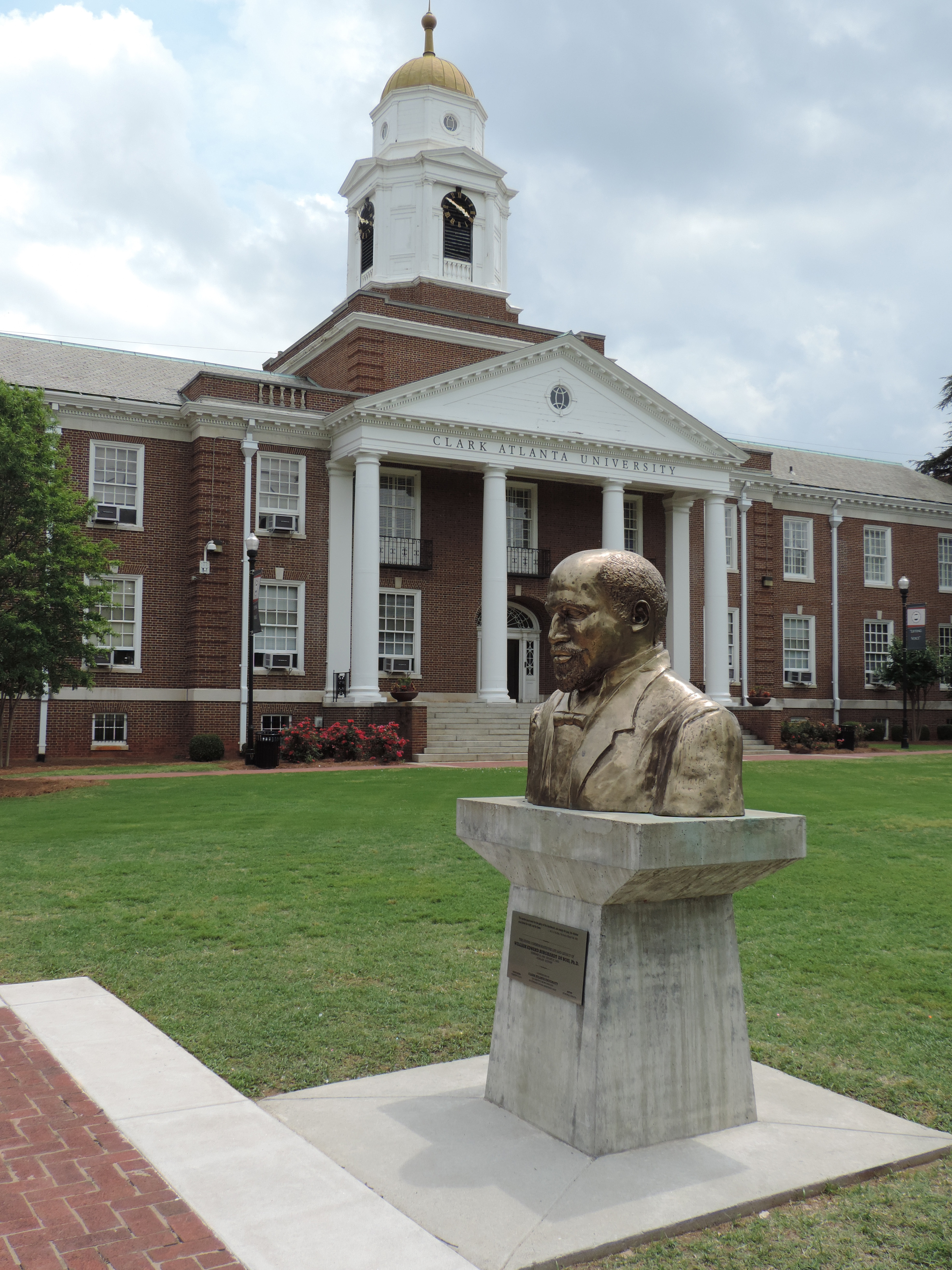
Bust of W.E.B. DuBois by Ayokunle Odeleye at Clark Atlanta University

Clark Atlanta University's main campus houses 37 buildings, including an art museum, on 126 acres (0.5 km^{2}) and is 1.4 miles (2.3 km) southwest of Downtown Atlanta.

=== North Hall (now Gaines Hall) ===
Atlanta University began on West Mitchell, about a mile from downtown Atlanta. Built in 1869 by architect William H. Parkins, North Hall, now Gaines Hall, was the first female dormitory on the campus of a co-ed school in the US. North Hall was Atlanta University's first purpose-built building. A year later, South Hall opened for boys. Wings were added to each in 1871 and 1880. In 1882, Stone Hall opened as the main building, containing the chapel, lecture halls, recitation rooms, laboratories and administrative offices. By 1905, the school had four more permanent buildings, including a Carnegie library. South Hall was later demolished by Morris Brown College. A fire in mid-August 2015 threatened to raze the building completely.

=== Stone Hall (now Fountain Hall) ===
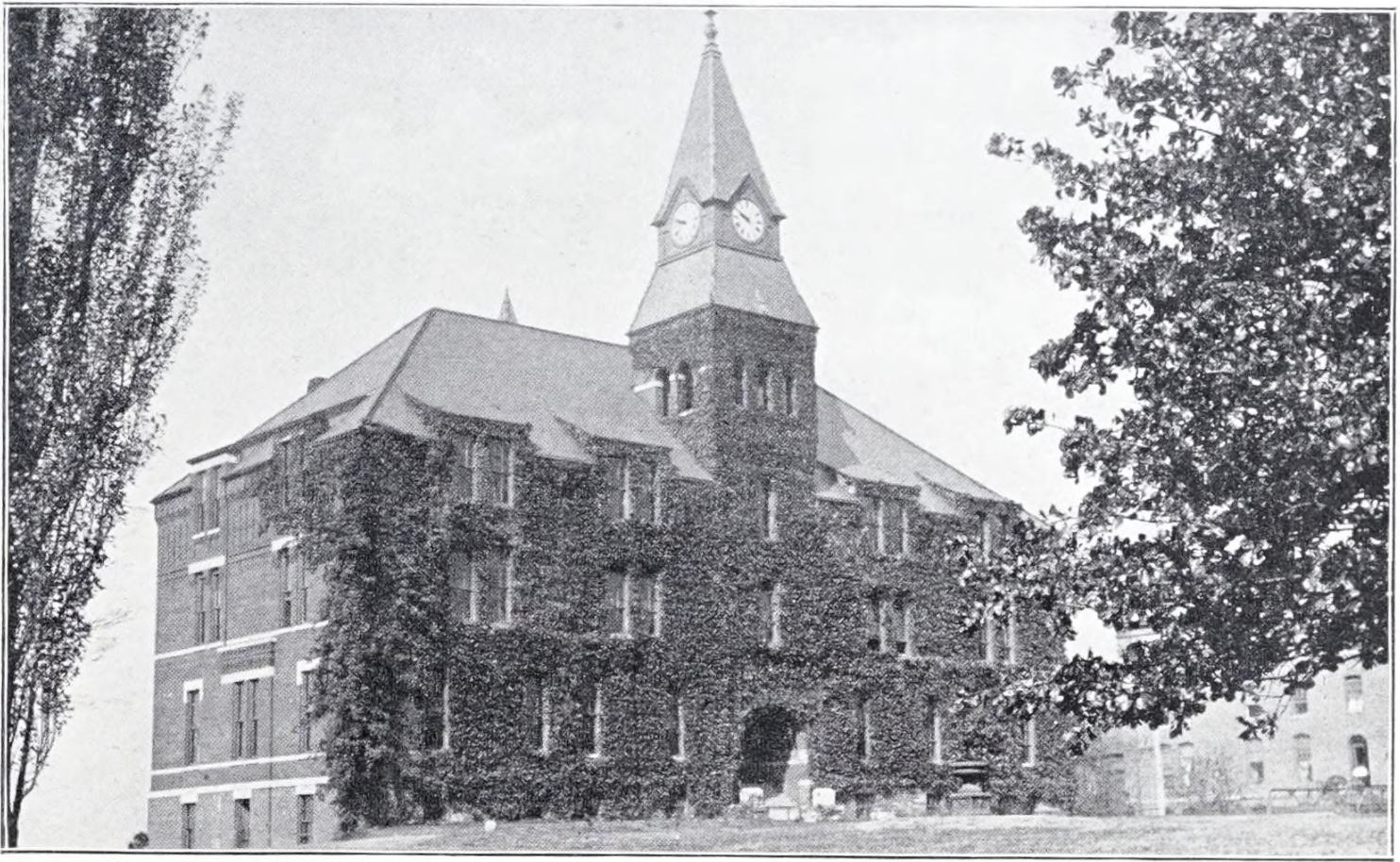
Stone Hall, c. 1910

Built in 1882 on the crest of Diamond Hill on the Morris Brown College campus, Fountain Hall is among the earlier structures on the original site of Atlanta University. Historically, the hall is significant for its role in providing higher education to Blacks in the US. Fountain Hall was made a National Historic Landmark in 1975 for its role in providing higher education to African Americans. It was designed by Atlanta architect G. L. Norrman, who was active during the late nineteenth and very early twentieth centuries; few of his works have survived. The three-story, red brick structure is an excellent example of the High Victorian style. Its clock tower is a rare sight in Atlanta.

Since its construction in 1882, Fountain Hall primarily functioned until 1929 as the administration building for Atlanta University, though it contained a chapel, library, recitation rooms, and laboratories during various times. It served in a similar capacity for Morris Brown College for many years. Currently, the structure contains offices, a chapel, art studios, and a gallery. Fountain Hall has been a gathering place and focus of activity in the education process of many of the mostly Black Americans attending the school. Because of Fountain Hall's location, it can be seen from some distance and has long served as a landmark for the historic Atlanta University Center.

In the early 1930s, Morris Brown College was in financial trouble and was forced to relinquish its property at Houston and Boulevard. Atlanta University was no longer using several of its original buildings since its affiliation with Spelman and Morehouse. In 1932, Bishop W. A. Fountain, chairman of the board of trustees (formerly college president) and his son, W. A. Fountain, Jr., President of Morris Brown College, negotiated for Morris Brown to become part of the university system and lease some of AU's vacant buildings on its old campus. Stone Hall was renamed Fountain Hall to honor the bishop. In the 1929, the college deeded the buildings, establishing a permanent home for Morris Brown College.

=== Residential facilities ===
CAU has considered its campus housing "residence halls" to emphasize they are more than merely places for students to sleep (the etymology of dormitory indicates it as a place to sleep). Undergraduate students with under 58 credits hours are required to live on campus.

== Academics ==
Academic rankings

National
- U.S. News & World Report: 361
- Washington Monthly: 161

Clark Atlanta offers undergraduate and graduate degrees through the following schools:

- School of Arts & Science
- School of Business
- School of Education
- School of Social Work

Clark Atlanta is the most comprehensive institution in the Atlanta University Center, offering over 40 degrees at the bachelor's, master's, and doctoral levels.

The university also houses the Robert H. “Bob” Bell Center for Innovation and Entrepreneurial Development (CIED), which offers entrepreneurship training, mentoring, business modeling support, and student innovation activities.

Clark Atlanta University is ranked No. 16 among Historically Black Colleges and Universities (HBCUs) for 2026 by U.S. News & World Report. Additionally, the university is annually recognized in the Washington Monthly list of "Best Colleges and Universities," which evaluates institutions based on their contributions to the public good in categories such as social mobility, research, and public service.

Clark Atlanta's social work graduate program consistently ranks among the 100 best in the nation by U.S. News & World Report.

Clark Atlanta's Center for Functional Nanoscale Measures (CFNM) has graduated more black Ph.D.s in Nanoscale Science than any HBCU in the nation.

The Isabella T. Jenkins Honors Program is a selective academic program established to provide a close-knit community for high-achieving undergraduates at Clark Atlanta.

== Student life ==
=== Student body ===
Annually between 30 and 40% of students are Georgia residents, while the remaining come from outside Georgia. Approximately 25% of students are male and 75% are female. In 2018, 89% of students identified as African-American/Black, 7% identified as other/unknown, and 4% identified as international. 95% of first-year students receive need-based financial aid. The average need-based scholarships or grants awarded to first-year students is $5,713.

=== Athletics ===
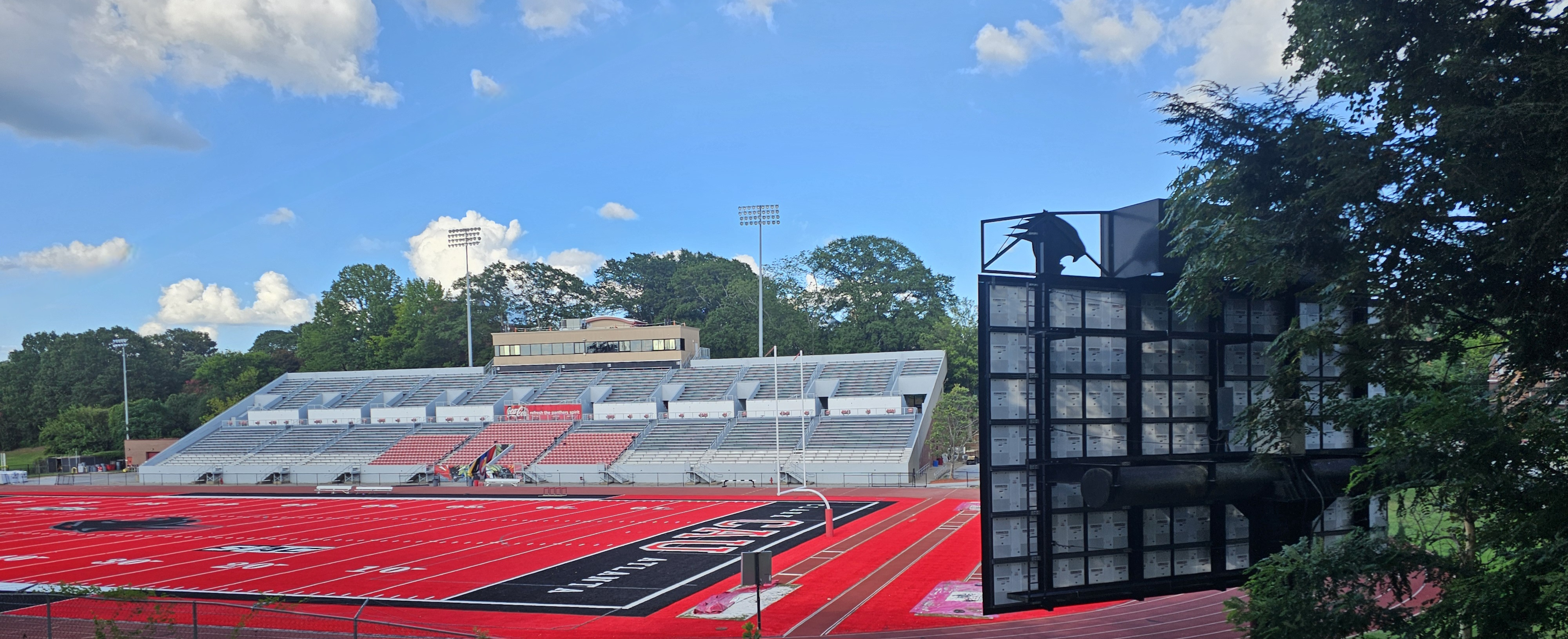
Panther Stadium in 2025

Clark Atlanta University, known athletically as the Panthers, competes within the Southern Intercollegiate Athletic Conference (SIAC) of the National Collegiate Athletic Association (NCAA), Division II. Men's sports include baseball, basketball, cross country, football and track & field; women's sports include basketball, cross country, softball, tennis, track & field and volleyball.

=== Marching band ===
The university's marching band is known as the Mighty Marching Panther Band.

=== National fraternities and sororities ===
All nine of the National Pan-Hellenic Council organizations have chapters established at Clark Atlanta University. About two percent of undergraduate men and three percent of undergraduate women are active in CAU's National Pan-Hellenic Council.

== See also ==
- List of historically black colleges of the United States
