= Hamline University School of Business =

Business school of Hamline University

Coordinates: 44.965929°N 93.164148°W

Hamline School of Business
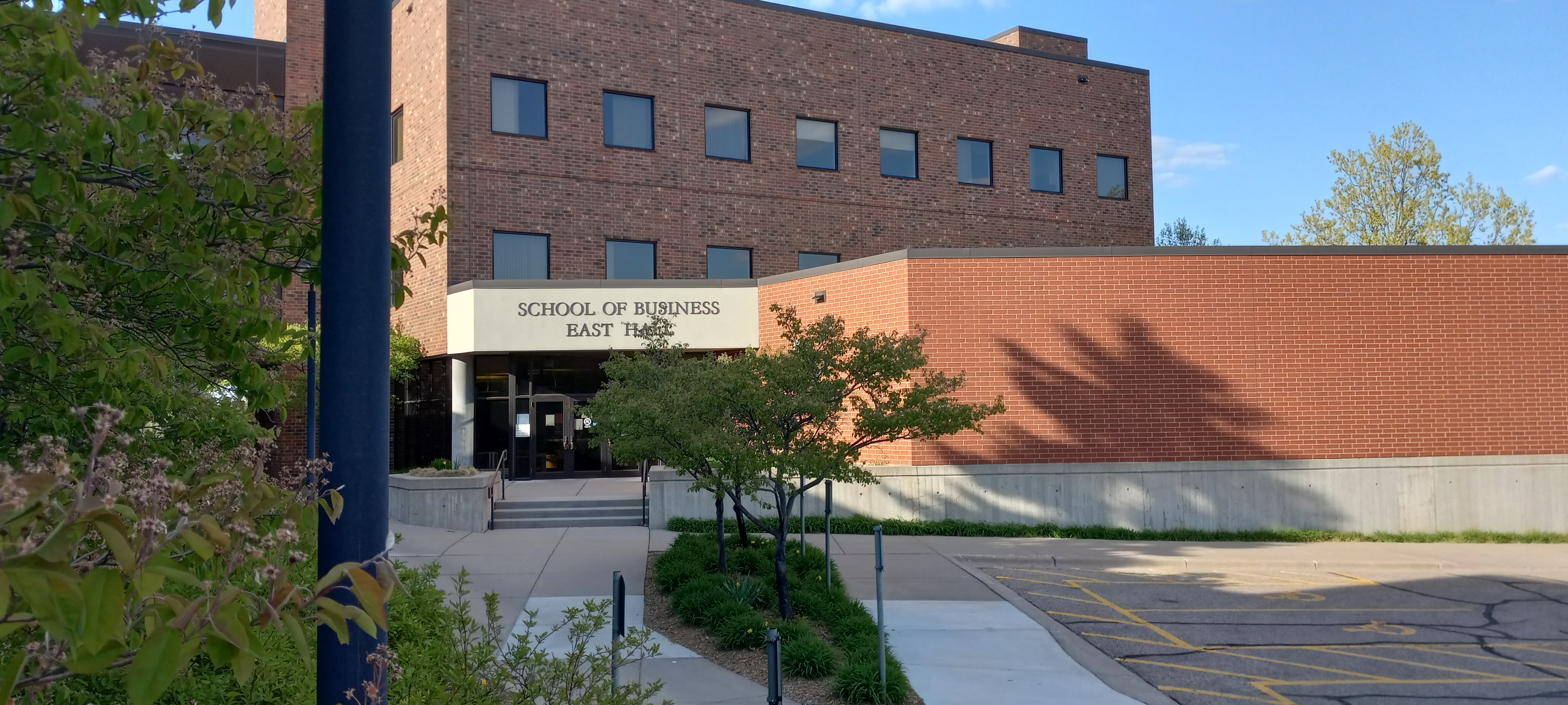
- Type: Private
- Established: 2008
- Dean: Anne McCarthy
- Location: Saint Paul, Minnesota, United States
- Campus: Urban
- Website: www.hamline.edu/business

The Hamline School of Business is the business school of Hamline University, a private liberal arts college in Saint Paul, Minnesota. The school offers programs in business administration (MBA), nonprofit management, and public administration, a doctorate in public administration, and undergraduate programs in business administration and economics. In addition, the school offers certificates in public administration and dual and joint degrees. Classes are held on Hamline's Saint Paul campus as well as its Saint Louis Park campus near Minneapolis.
