= Davis Wasgatt Clark =

American journalist

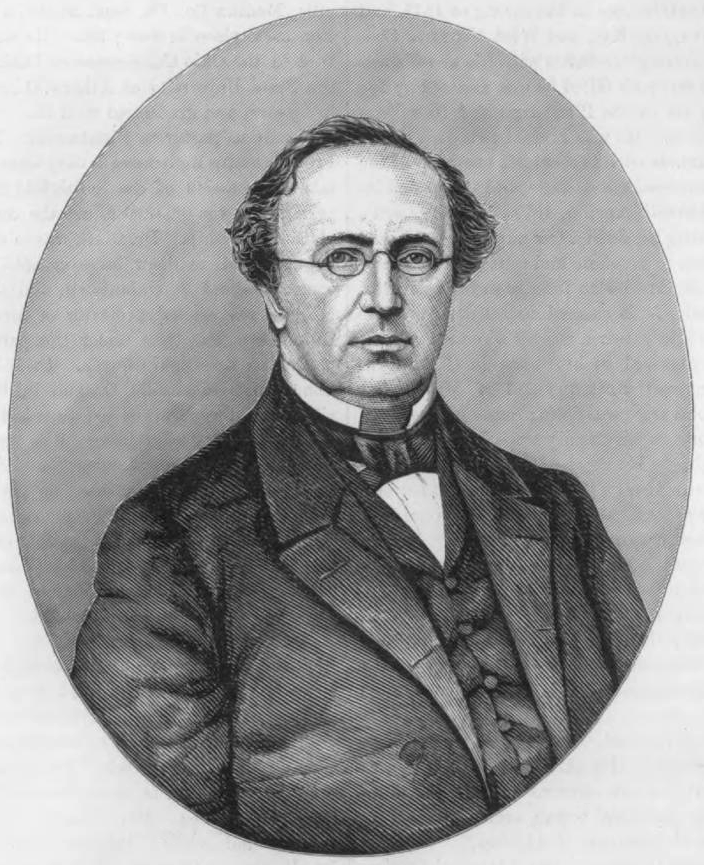
- Born: February 25, 1812; Mount Desert Island, Maine
- Died: May 23, 1871 (aged 59); Cincinnati, Ohio
- Education: Kents Hill School; Wesleyan University
- Occupation: Clergyman

Davis Wasgatt Clark (February 25, 1812 – May 23, 1871) was an American Bishop of the Methodist Episcopal Church, elected in 1864; the first President of the Freedman's Aid Society; and the namesake of Clark Atlanta University, an HBCU.

== Birth and early life ==
Clark was born on Mount Desert Island, Hancock County, Maine. He was a grandson of Davis Wasgatt, a soldier of the American Revolutionary War. Influenced by the family altar, at the age of 16 he joined the first Methodist Class formed by the Rev. David Stimson on Mount Desert Island.

== Education ==
Clark graduated from Kents Hill School in 1833. He then graduated from Wesleyan University of Connecticut in 1836.

== Ordained ministry ==
After some years of teaching at Amenia Seminary in New York, Clark joined the traveling ministry of the New York Annual Conference in 1843. He served as pastor, educator and editor, including time spent as the editor of the Ladies' Repository, a Methodist Episcopal women's magazine. This appointment was spent in Cincinnati.

== Episcopal ministry ==
Clark was elected a bishop in 1864. In 1866 he was called upon to serve as a mediator to reunite the northern and southern branches of the M.E. Church. He also played an important role in healing the spiritual wounds created by the American Civil War.

He was the first president of the Freedman's Aid Society of the Methodist Episcopal Church. Clark College, founded in 1869, was named in his honor. In 1877, the school was chartered as Clark University and its first degree was conferred in 1880. The school was relocated in 1933. In 1988, the school merged with Atlanta University, thus becoming Clark Atlanta University.

Bishop Clark became one of the most popular and best known Methodist leaders during the post-Civil War years.

He died in Cincinnati, Ohio, May 23, 1871. At the time of his death, he was one of the country's leading religious personalities.

== Books ==
- Elements of Algebra: Embracing Also the Theory and Application of Logarithms. New York: Harper & Brothers, 1846.
- Man All Immortal; or, The Nature and Destination of Man as Taught by Reason and Revelation. Cincinnati: Poe & Hitchcock, 1864.
- Mental Discipline: With Reference to the Acquisition and Communication of Knowledge. New York: Lane & Tippett, 1847.
- Sermons for the College. Akers, 1851.

Note: Many other works which were edited by Rev. Clark are currently available at Google Books.

== See also ==
- Clark Atlanta University
- List of bishops of the United Methodist Church
