= Lafayette Avenue Presbyterian Church =

Lafayette Avenue Presbyterian Church may refer to:

- Lafayette Avenue Presbyterian Church (Buffalo, New York)
- Lafayette Avenue Presbyterian Church, a church in Brooklyn noted for the abolitionist preaching of Theodore L. Cuyler
