= Minnesota Building =

- U.S. National Register of Historic Places
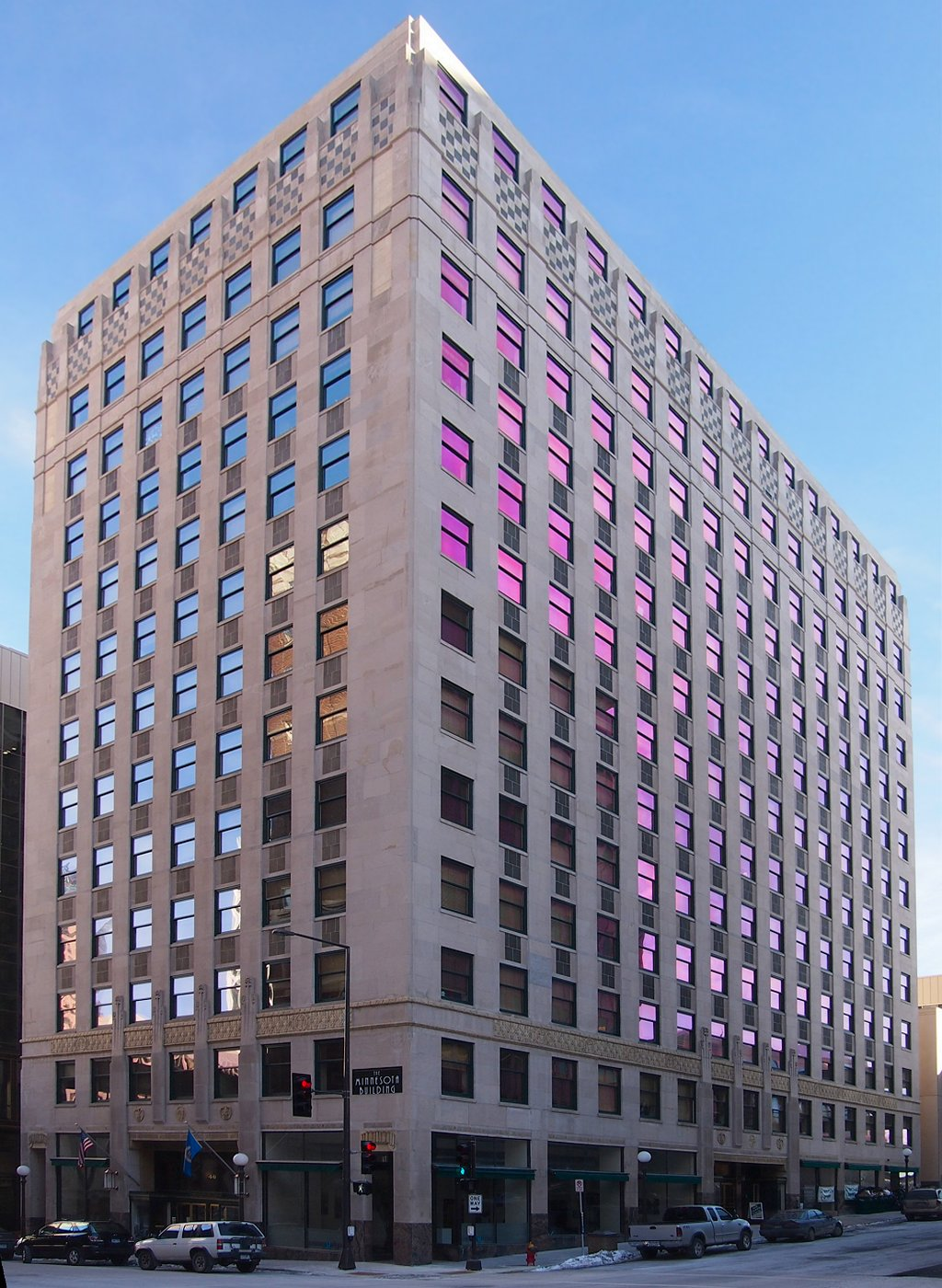
- The Minnesota Building

- Location within Minnesota Location within the United States
- Location: 46 East 4th Street; Saint Paul, Minnesota
- Coordinates: 44°56′43.52″N 93°5′31.69″W
- Built: 1929
- Architect: Charles A. Hausler
- Architectural style: Art Deco/Moderne
- NRHP reference No.: 09000408
- Added to NRHP: June 10, 2009

The Minnesota Building is a historic office building in Saint Paul, Minnesota, United States. The structure was placed on the National Register of Historic Places (NRHP) on June 10, 2009. The building was noted for its design, which was a harbinger for the transition from Classical architecture to the Art Deco/Moderne among commercial buildings in downtown Saint Paul; originally designed in a conservative style, the building became more Moderne as it was being built.

== Structure ==
The Minnesota Building is a thirteen-story office tower located on the corner of East 4th Street and Cedar Street in downtown St. Paul. It is built of reinforced concrete and has a polished Indiana Limestone facing. The structure's primary facades face the streets to the north and west, and have entrance bays flanked by commercial display window bays at the pedestrial level and vertical window shafts separated by limestone piers between the second and thirteenth stories.

At the pedestrian level, the East Fourth Street facade is symmetrical with the main building entrance flanked by display window bays and tall pedestrian openings on the outer corners. On the Cedar Street side the building's secondary entrance is flanked by three display window bays to either side. On both primary facades the base is sheathed with polished pink and gray marble. Directly above each bay opening is a narrow band of decorative, colored tile. The main entrance is recessed and displays two sets of brass plated doors flanked by wrought iron and glass display cases. Above the doors and cases is a band of cresting with a center metal plaque reading "MINNESOTA BUILDING". Above the cresting are five large transom windows, with the building address "46" painted in gold on the center window. The top of the entry recess is framed with decorative cream-colored terra cotta, which continues along the ceiling. In addition, the entrance has two large brass wall lanterns and, above the entrance, is a low-relief stone version of the Seal of Minnesota, flanked by two stylized eagles facing inward. The secondary entrance is similar to the main entrance, except the bay opening is not as tall and has only a short horizontal transom above the entry doors along with smaller wall lanterns. The tall pedestrian openings are crowned with terra cotta scrollwork. The opening facing the street corner also has a recessed corner shop entry.

The two entrances are further defined by side piers and two piers directly above which are decorated with raised stone shafts stepping and terminating with floral motifs halfway up the third story. An ornate terra cotta belt separates the second and third stories. Simple raised edge banding occurs in stone between the eleventh and twelfth stories. The building has no cornice; it was one of the first buildings in the area to dispense with them. Above the twelfth story, the attic story, is a blind frieze of checkered stonework, terminating in a toothy crown formed by the rise of the piers above the parapet in stepped, zigzag finials. The spandrels between the buildings windows were cast in a geometric pattern and set flush with the piers, spreading the checkered motif downward across the entire facade. The building originally had double hung windows on the upper floors, however they were replaced in 1974 with metal-clad windows.

The secondary facades, facing east and south internally in the block, are defined by similar window placement, but with concrete floor banding between floors and common brick infill between windows; these facades also display "MINNESOTA BLDG." painted in large block letters between the twelfth and thirteenth window rows. The windows on the upper floors of the southern facade were altered in the latter quarter of the twentieth century to improve views of the Mississippi River. The building has a flat composition roof and an iron fire-escape on the southern facade. It is connected to the Saint Paul Skyway System through an adjacent building.

The building was originally constructed with twelve stories, the thirteenth story was begun a soon as the building was completed in 1929 and completed in 1930. The thirteenth story is sheathed in the same limestone and repeats the window pattern; the new roof did not feature the same toothy crown that was integrated into the facade of the thirteenth story.

== History ==
The state capital, St. Paul was most prosperous during the late 1800s and early 1900s, much of its downtown development occurred during that period. Construction in downtown St. Paul was slow in the early 1920s. Several significant buildings were constructed in the previous decade, though all commercial and public buildings relied heavily on the classical style, such as the St. Paul Public Library (1917) and Hamm Building (1919). After the Hamm Building, no multistory office building was built in St. Paul until the Minnesota Building, itself the first high rise building in the city since World War I.

The Minnesota Building was the idea of a consortium of developers interested in creating a higher business density in downtown. Lead developers Lincoln Hold and Development Company purchased the first Minnesota Club site in 1928 and razed it to the ground. Designed by St. Paul architect Charles A. Hauser, construction began in 1929 by the Fleisher-Greg Construction Company. Finished on November 1, 1929, the building cost an estimated $970,000, and was designed mainly for office suites for upscale business. The architect moved into the building's additional penthouse floor as soon as it was finished in 1930. The structure has 101,000 square feet (9,400 m^{2}) of interior floorspace.

The building's architect, Charles A. Hausler, has several other buildings listed on the NRHP: St. Anthony Park Branch Library, Arlington Hills Library, Riverview Branch Library, also in Ramsey County, Minnesota, as well as the St. Mary's Church Non-Contiguous Historic District in Hague, North Dakota. Born in St. Paul in 1879, he apprenticed in Chicago with Louis Sullivan before returning to Minnesota being licensed in 1908. He was named as St. Paul's first City Architect in 1914 and served for five terms before leaving in 1923 to serve eight terms in the Minnesota Senate. While city architect he drafted the city's first uniform building code in 1921, and designed numerous municipal buildings including the Beaux-Arts Carnegie libraries that were later placed on the NRHP. He returned to private practice while in the Minnesota Senate, and during that time designed the Minnesota Building, which was his largest work.

By the late 1990s, the demand for modern office space caused the building to fall out of favor with commercial renters, and it began to fall into disuse. As early as 2003, plans were proposed to turn the building into a residential building with limited, street level commercial space. It was purchased by Sand Companies in spring 2006, and in January 2010, the developer began construction on converting the building into 137 rental housing units, including some affordable units as well as 10,000 square feet (930 m^{2}) of commercial and office space

== Significance ==
The Minnesota Building was the first Art Deco building in downtown St. Paul. Originally designed in a conservative style, the building became more Moderne as it was being built. Its design reflects a transition from Classical architecture to the Art Deco/Moderne design that gained wide popularity in downtown Saint Paul from the late 1920s through early 1940s. The building was followed by a small boom of notable Art Deco buildings in downtown St. Paul, including the Saint Paul City Hall and Ramsey County Courthouse, Saint Paul Women's City Club, Salvation Army Headquarters and First National Bank Building. Architecture critics had described the style used as "mild art deco" with features that are "very urbane."
