= Milton Square =

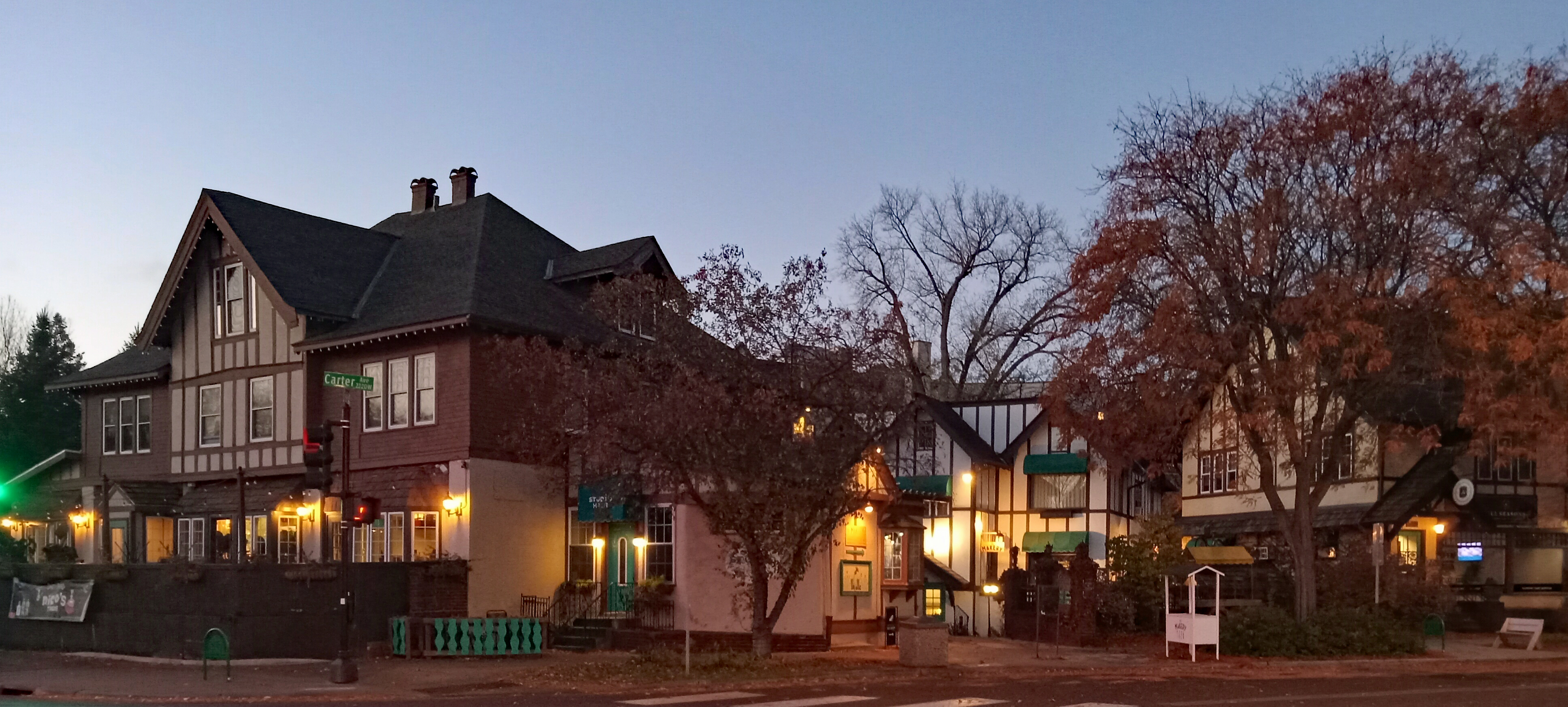
- Milton Square storefronts at the corner of Como and Carter Avenues
- Interactive map of the Milton Square area
- Alternative names: Tamarack Lodge, Old Fireside Inn

General information
- Architectural style: English Tudor Revival
- Location: 2262 Como Ave, St. Paul, United States
- Coordinates: 44°58′52″N 93°11′41″W
- Construction started: 1909
- Completed: 1912

Design and construction
- Architect: Franklin Ellerbe

Milton Square is a complex containing businesses and residential apartments located at the southwest corner of Como and Carter Avenues in the St. Anthony Park neighborhood of St. Paul, Minnesota, near the University of Minnesota St. Paul campus.

== Design and construction ==
The Midway Investment Company contracted Franklin Ellerbe to design a mixed use building along Como Avenue in 1909, and they built additional structures in 1912 along Carter Avenue. This formed a complex of residential flats and storefronts surrounding a central courtyard. The complex also had two social halls, the Tamarack Lodge and the Old Fireside Inn, which were important community centers for St. Anthony Park.

== Notable tenants and owners ==
August Franke was an early anchor tenant and later building owner. He operated a meat market, a grocery, a bakery, and a notions shop. In the 1910s, he ran a lending library out of the store, and was instrumental in the formation of the neighborhood's St. Anthony Park Branch Library. Franke owned the complex until his death in 1950.

Mary Ann Milton, an early woman realtor in St. Paul, purchased the complex in the late 1950s, and her family owned it until mid-2025, when it was sold to a group of local investors and historic preservationists. Milton promoted the site's European flair, attracting fashionable boutiques and cafes as tenants. Milton and the complex were frequent topics in Oliver Towne's popular columns in the Saint Paul Dispatch newspaper. Towne is believed to be the source of the name "Milton Square."

The complex features several notable neighborhood businesses.

== Community significance ==
Milton Square has historically played an important role in the commerce and social life of the St. Anthony Park neighborhood, and several of its businesses are popular hangouts for University of Minnesota professors. Milton Square is also architecturally significant as an intact example of Tudor Revival architecture and as the first design by Franklin Ellerbe, the founder of Ellerbe Becket.
