= Metropolitan State University Library and Learning Center =

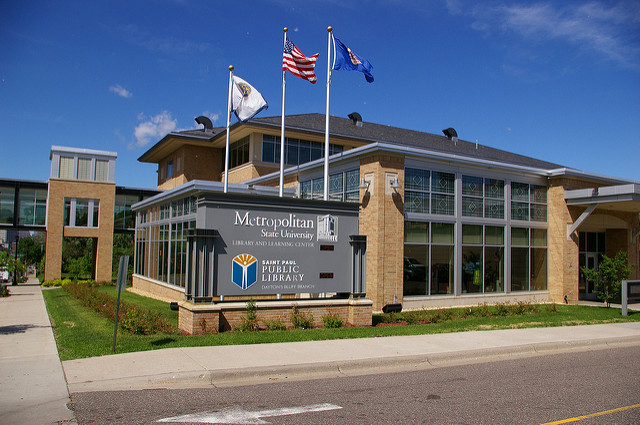
- The east entrance
- Interactive map of the Metropolitan State University Library and Learning Center area

General information
- Location: 645 E 7th St, St Paul, MN 55106, Saint Paul, MN
- Coordinates: 44.957054°N 93.075963°W
- Opening: 2004

Website
- www.metrostate.edu/library

The Metropolitan State University Library and Learning Center, or Metro State Library, located in the Dayton's Bluff neighborhood of Saint Paul, Minnesota, was constructed in 2004. The library serves the 11,580 students of Metropolitan State University, a four-year public university in Minnesota, as well as community patrons from the surrounding neighborhood.

The library and learning center resources cover two floors of the building, and houses the university's print collection, as well as a large information commons space on the first floor.

The university library shares a building with the Dayton's Bluff branch of the Saint Paul Public Library, making it only one of a handful of joint-use libraries in the country. The two libraries frequently plan programs or host events together, to support academic learning and community engagement.

== Library construction ==
Although the university was founded in 1971, the library was not built until 2004. Originally designed as a "university without walls," Metropolitan State University students and faculty were reliant on the libraries of other area colleges and universities, which sometimes caused strained relationships between Metropolitan State and other institutions. Plans for a library began in earnest in 1992 when Metropolitan State University purchased the property that would become the Dayton's Bluff campus. The university's plans for a library and desire to work with the Dayton's Bluff community coincided with the long-time desire for a new branch of the Saint Paul Public Library. Funding for the library came from $2 million in grants and an additional $1 million from the Minnesota State Legislature, with a total cost of $21 million to construct the building.

The Metropolitan State University Library and Learning Center is a three-floor building, housing not only the public and academic libraries, but also the campus bookstore, the writing center, a small art gallery, meeting rooms, faculty offices, and a few classrooms. The building is connected via skyway to both the New Main building and St. John's Hall. The building is located only a few blocks from downtown Saint Paul and the Minnesota State Capitol.

== A joint-use library ==
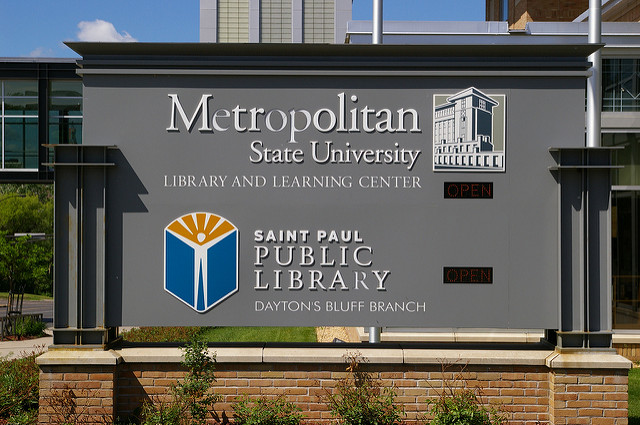
Library sign for the joint Metropolitan University and Learning Center and the Dayton's Bluff Public Library.

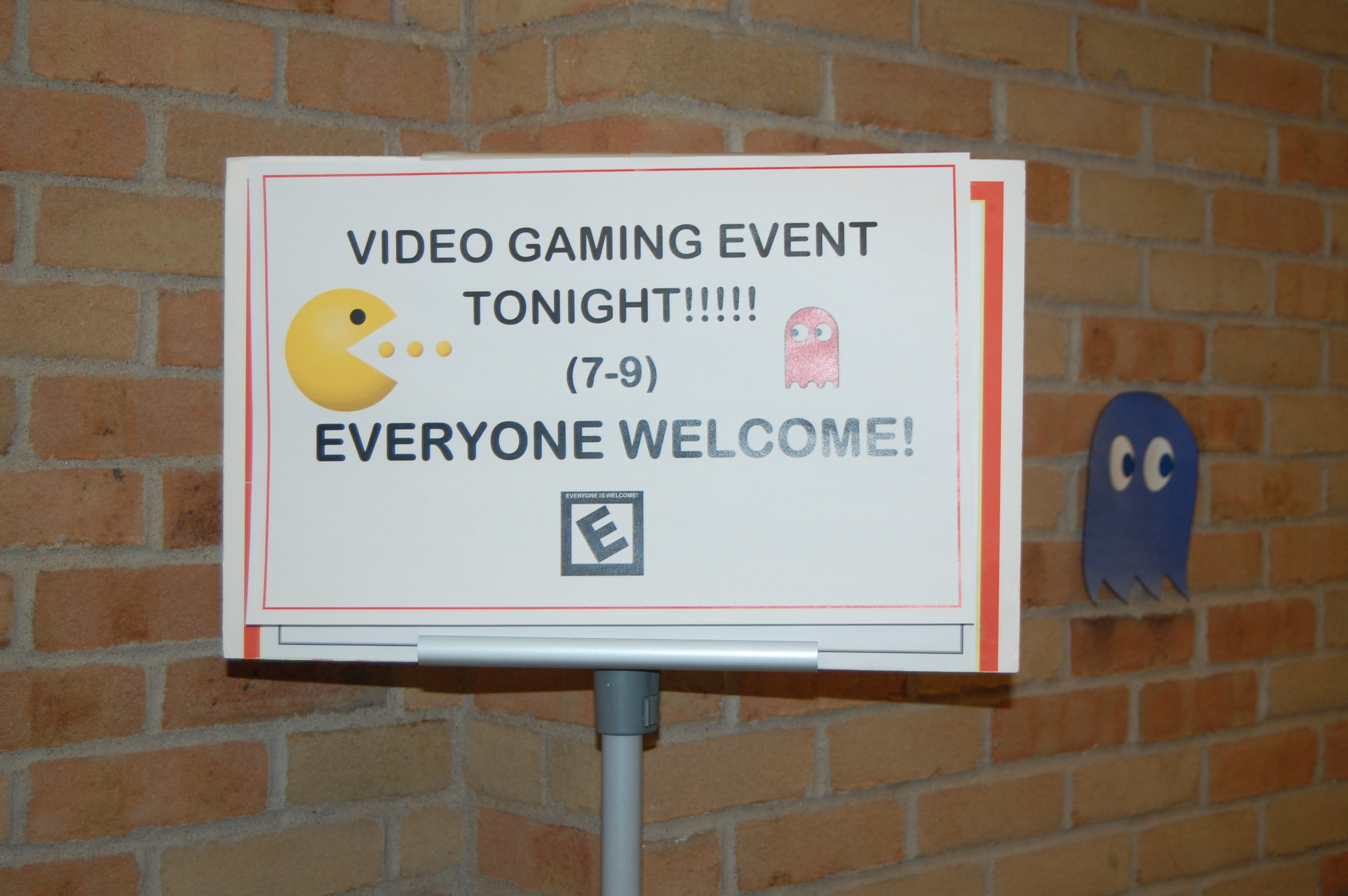
Photograph of an event sign reading "Video Gaming Event Tonight (7-9). Everyone welcome! Rated E."

The Metropolitan State University Library and Learning Center is located in the same building as the Saint Paul Public Library's Dayton's Bluff Branch. It was the first joint-use library in Minnesota to house both an academic library and a public library, and is one of only seven such libraries in the United States. The Metropolitan State Library and Information Center encourages community use of resources at both libraries, and issues community cards for patrons who are not faculty, staff, or students at Metropolitan State University.

As a part of their commitment to community engagement, Metropolitan State University founded ICES (Institute for Community and Engagement in Scholarship) in order to have a way to focus their outreach efforts. The libraries host joint events, including the 2015 National Endowment for the Arts (NEA) Big Read, and author talks such as a 2013 visit with Rainbow Rowell. They also support community book clubs for adults and a teen reading club, and provide programming in and around the David Barton Community Labyrinth and Garden on the library's west lawn.

== Teens Know Best ==
Teens Know Best (TKB) is a collaborative effort between Metropolitan State University Library and Learning Center and the Dayton's Bluff Branch of the Saint Paul Public Library. Their shared facility offers teens a place each month to discuss young adult books. They receive a special Metropolitan State University Library card that allows members to check out books from the TKB collection. The feedback and opinions shared by Teens is also used to help determine YALSA's annual "Teens' Top Ten" book award nominees.

The TKB book club provides teens ages 12–18 an exclusive opportunity to review and discuss young adult (YA) books that have yet to be released by participating Young Adult Publishers. As part of YALSA's ongoing Young Adult Galley /Teen's Top Ten project, TKB participants are able to submit feedback to YA Publishers in order to influence their work and to guide their decisions.

== David Barton Community Labyrinth and Reflective Garden ==
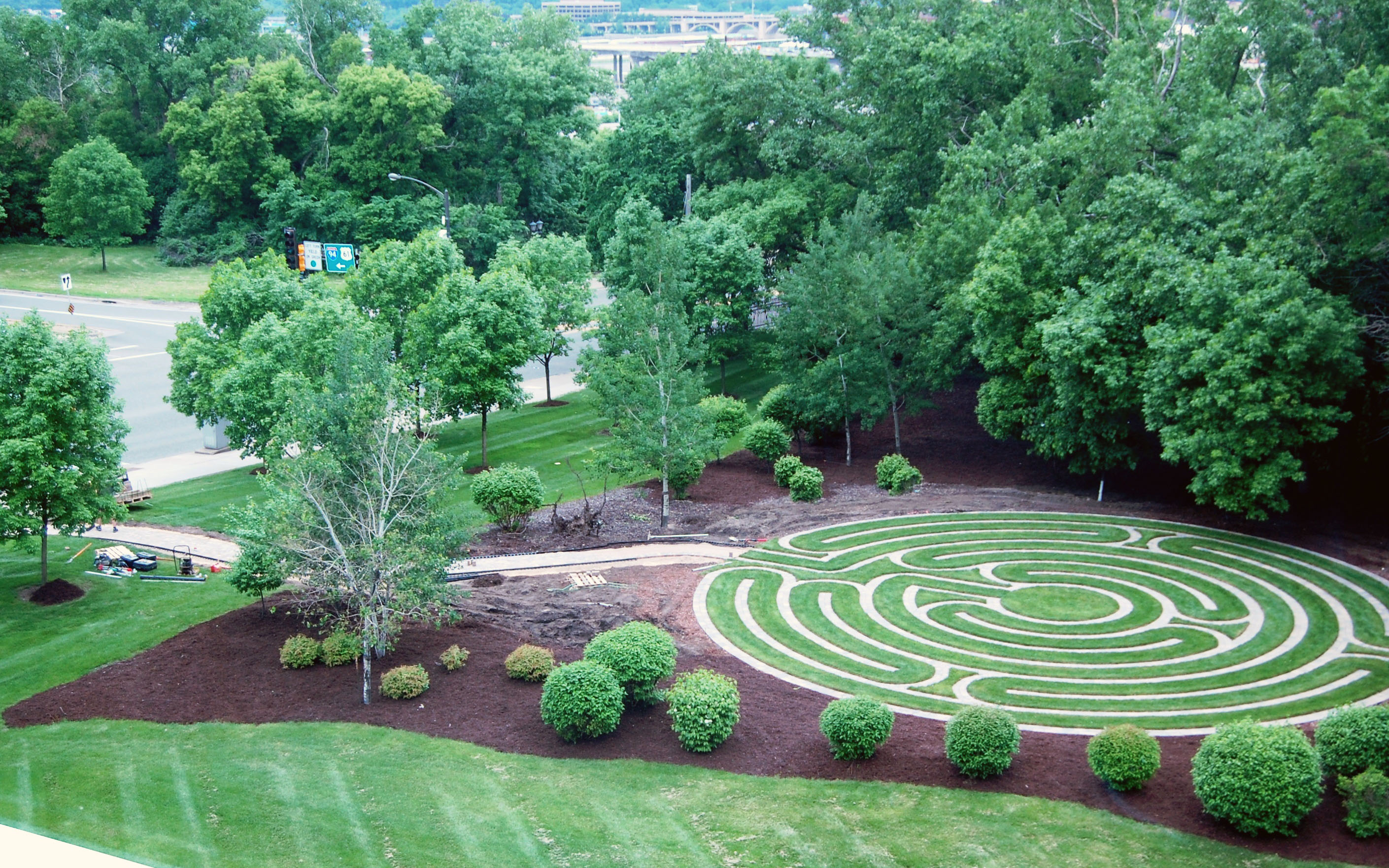
A photograph of the David Barton Community Labyrinth during garden planting in 2013.

The David Barton Labyrinth and Reflective Garden was named in honor of David Barton, who was the Dean of the Metropolitan State University Library from 2002 until 2012. It is also known as the "Paths of Peace Labyrinth". The labyrinth design is a 7-circuit circle of peace made of paving stones and turf, and was designed by Lisa Moriarty.

After David Barton's death in 2012, plans were made to honor his contributions to the library, especially his involvement with the construction of the Library and Learning Center The labyrinth and gardens were planned by a university-wide committee and the labyrinth is now used by a number of groups for curricular purposes. The labyrinth and reflection garden have offered another community engagement space for the library, since it is used both by students and community members.
