= Charles A. Hausler =

American architect

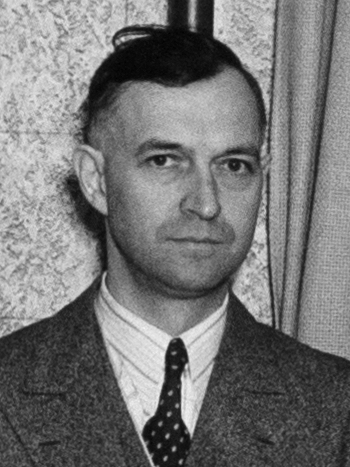
Hausler in 1932

Charles Alfred Hausler (January 27, 1889 – July 12, 1971) was an American architect. Over his long career he had a major impact on the built environment of Saint Paul, Minnesota. As the first person to hold the office of city architect, he designed many public buildings, including Saint Paul's three Carnegie libraries. He also designed churches, commercial buildings, and homes in a variety of styles, including Neoclassical, Prairie School, and Art Deco.

== Early life and education ==
Hausler was born in Saint Paul's West Seventh neighborhood in 1889. After attending Mechanic Arts High School for a few years, he apprenticed for several of the top architects in the American Midwest, including Clarence H. Johnston Sr. in Saint Paul, Harry Wild Jones in Minneapolis, and Louis Sullivan in Chicago. This was all before Hausler was twenty, by which time he had returned to Saint Paul and begun practicing architecture. He worked with a number of young, talented partners, including Percy Dwight Bentley, who became one of the leading Prairie School architects.

== City architect ==
Saint Paul created the office of the city architect in 1914, and Hausler, who was only twenty-five, was the first person to hold the position. Under his direction the office designed schools, fire stations, police stations, garages, and park buildings. In 1915, Hausler hired Clarence W. Wigington as the office's senior draftsman; this was the beginning of Wigington's career as a municipal architect in Saint Paul.

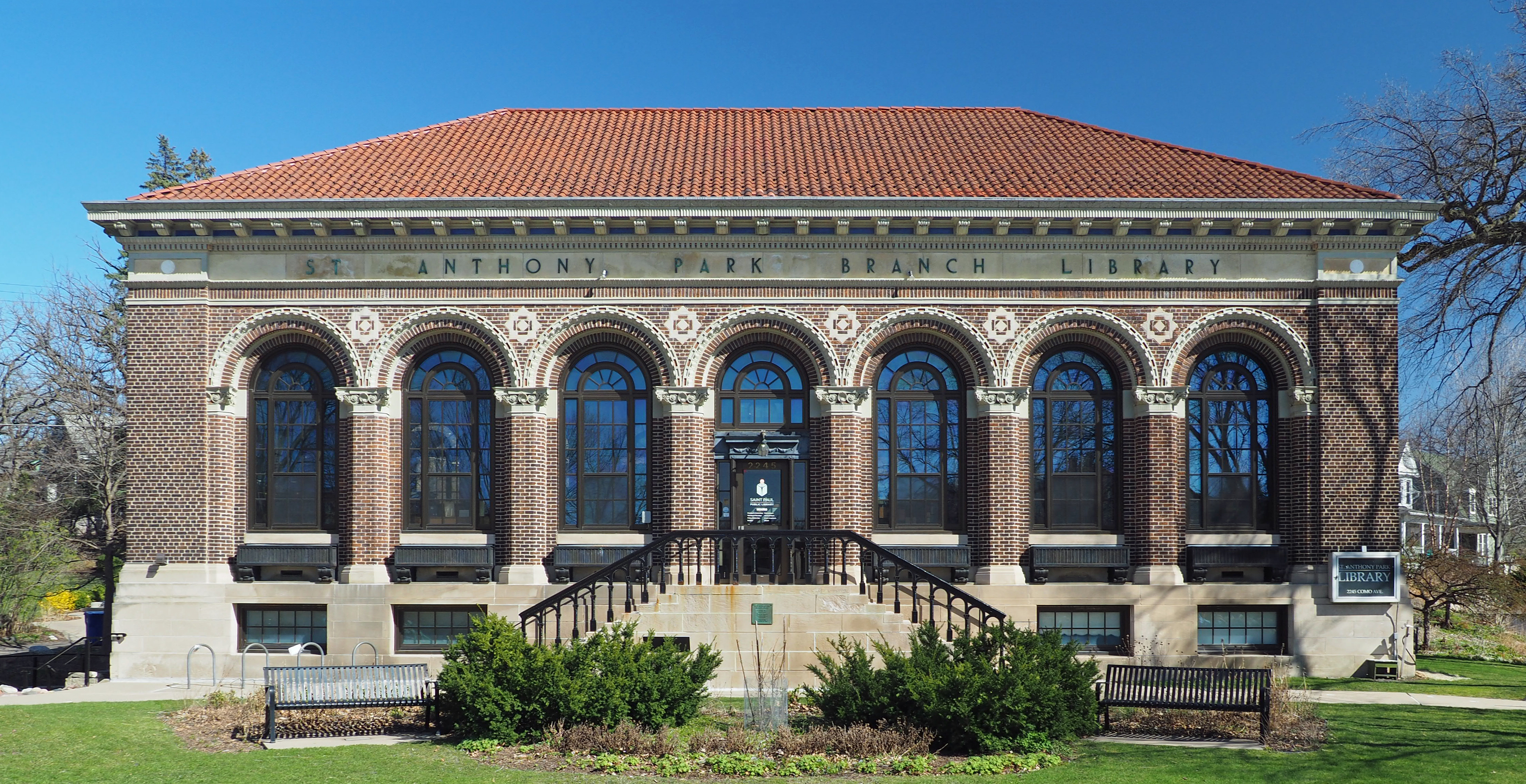
St. Anthony Park Branch Library

One of Hausler's first duties as city architect was overseeing the construction of the Saint Paul Public Library's downtown main building. Electus D. Litchfield of New York designed the building, and it was Hausler's job to make sure it was built according to plan. A few months after he was appointed, Hausler inspected the building site and determined that the contractor was using substandard bricks in the walls. He ordered the contractor to replace them. The contractor went to the mayor to demand that Hausler be fired, claiming that he was "inexperienced and unqualified". The city stood by the young architect, and the contractor agreed to remove the questionable bricks from the building site. Hausler saw the construction of the new library through to its completion.

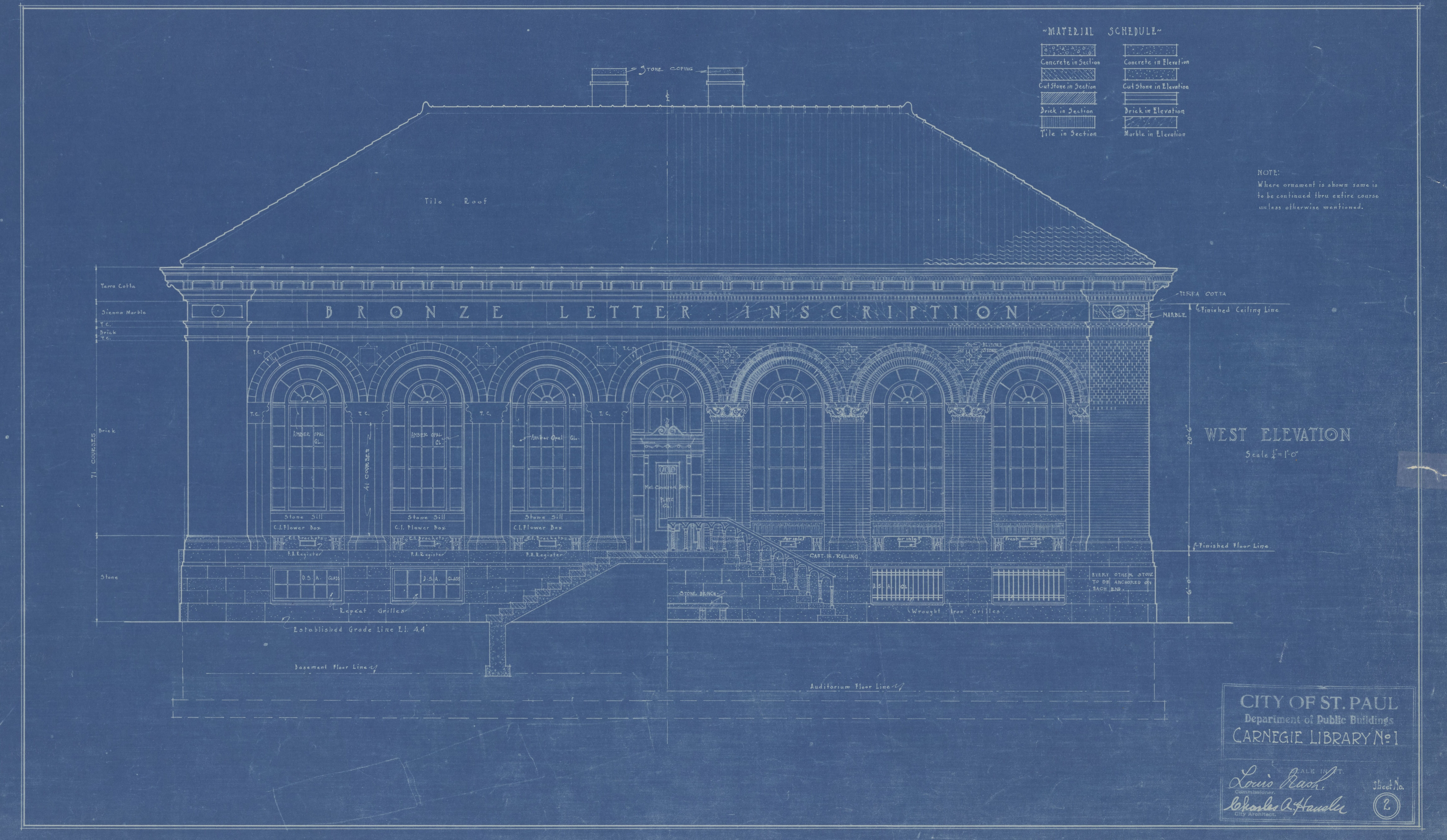
Blueprints for the Saint Anthony Park Library featuring Hausler's signature

Meanwhile, Andrew Carnegie donated money to Saint Paul to build the Arlington Hills, Riverview, and St. Anthony Park Branch Libraries. Hausler designed each of these in Neoclassical style. All three were added to the National Register of Historic Places in 1984.

Hausler also designed several Saint Paul Public School buildings in Neoclassical style, including Como Park Elementary School and Randolph Heights Elementary School. He designed Prairie School buildings for the city, including a variety of park structures. One of them—the pavilion in Indian Mounds Park—became a popular picnicking site.

== Private practice and politics ==
During Hausler's years as city architect he continued his private practice, specializing in Prairie School home designs. Examples include the homes at 1058 St. Clair Avenue in Summit Hill and at 633 Holly Avenue in the Summit-University neighborhood. Hausler's own 1917 home (now at 526 Grace Street, St. Paul) has been described as influenced by Frank Lloyd Wright.

Hausler's eight-year tenure as city architect came to an end in 1922 when he was elected to the Minnesota Senate. He represented Saint Paul in the Senate until 1939, starting out as a progressive Republican and ending up as a member of the Farmer–Labor Party. His architectural practice thrived during this period, and he enjoyed success designing Art Deco buildings. Two of these—the Minnesota Building in downtown Saint Paul and the Minnesota Milk Company Building on University Avenue in Frogtown—are listed on the National Register. Although Hausler remained centered in Saint Paul, he designed buildings throughout the Midwest into the 1950s.

Historic St. Andrew's Church in St. Paul, designed by Hausler

A significant part of Hausler's practice involved churches, which he used to experiment with Gothic, Romanesque, and Byzantine Revival styles. One of these, St. Mary’s Catholic Church in Hague, North Dakota (built 1930), was listed on the National Register as part of the St. Mary's Church Non-contiguous Historic District. It is a Romanesque Revival building with Byzantine touches, designed for a German-Russian parish that had lost its original church to fire. The Roman Catholic Church of St. Andrew in St. Paul has been described as "a rare example of 1920s American ecclesiastical architecture in the style of Byzantine and North Italian Lombard Romanesque."
