= Ramsey County Library =

Coordinates: 45.082819°N 93.134035°W

Ramsey County Library is a library system that operates in suburban Ramsey County, Minnesota, United States. The system has seven branches. The library started in the 1920s when the extension division of the Saint Paul Public Library provided books for various public schools in the county outside of Saint Paul. It was officially established by the county in 1951. The library system is governed by a seven-member Library Board appointed by Ramsey County Board of Commissioners. The "Friends of the Ramsey County Library" was formed in 1979 as a non-profit organization dedicated to supporting the libraries. It is a member of the Metropolitan Library Service Agency, a consortium of eight Twin Cities library systems. Today more than 600,000 items are available in the Ramsey County Library collection, growing from 43,000 items in 1954. More than 1.6 million people visit the seven RCPL libraries annually. The Roseville branch is a green library.

== Locations ==
- The Roseville Library was built in 1964, remodeled in 1981, rebuilt in 1993, and again remodeled with expansion in 2010.
- The Maplewood Library was built in 1967, rebuilt in 1993, and rebuilt and relocated in 2007.
- The White Bear Lake library joined the Ramsey County Library system in 1967, and a new library was built in 1974, which was then remodeled and expanded in 2015.
- The North Saint Paul Library joined the county system in 1972, and a new library was built in 1977, with the branch library relocated in 2005 into a shared-use building.
- The Mounds View Library was built in 1990.
- The Shoreview Library was built in 1992 and relocated into a new building in 2017.
- The New Brighton Library opened in its current location in 2011 in the New Brighton Community Center building. (Previously, the Arden Hills branch served area residents from 1969 to 2010.)

== Directors ==
- Ruth Palmer 1951-1969 (County Librarian 1939-1951)
- Phyllis Olmen 1970 (acting director)
- Nowell Leitzke 1970-1971
- Norman Vinnes 1971-1993
- Marianne Roos 1993-1999
- Alice Jo Carlson 1999-2005
- Susan Nemitz 2005–2016
- Jill Boldenow 2016–2020
- Jake Grussing 2022
