= Dakota County Library =

Regional public library system in Dakota County, Minnesota

Coordinates: 44°49′4″N 93°9′48″W

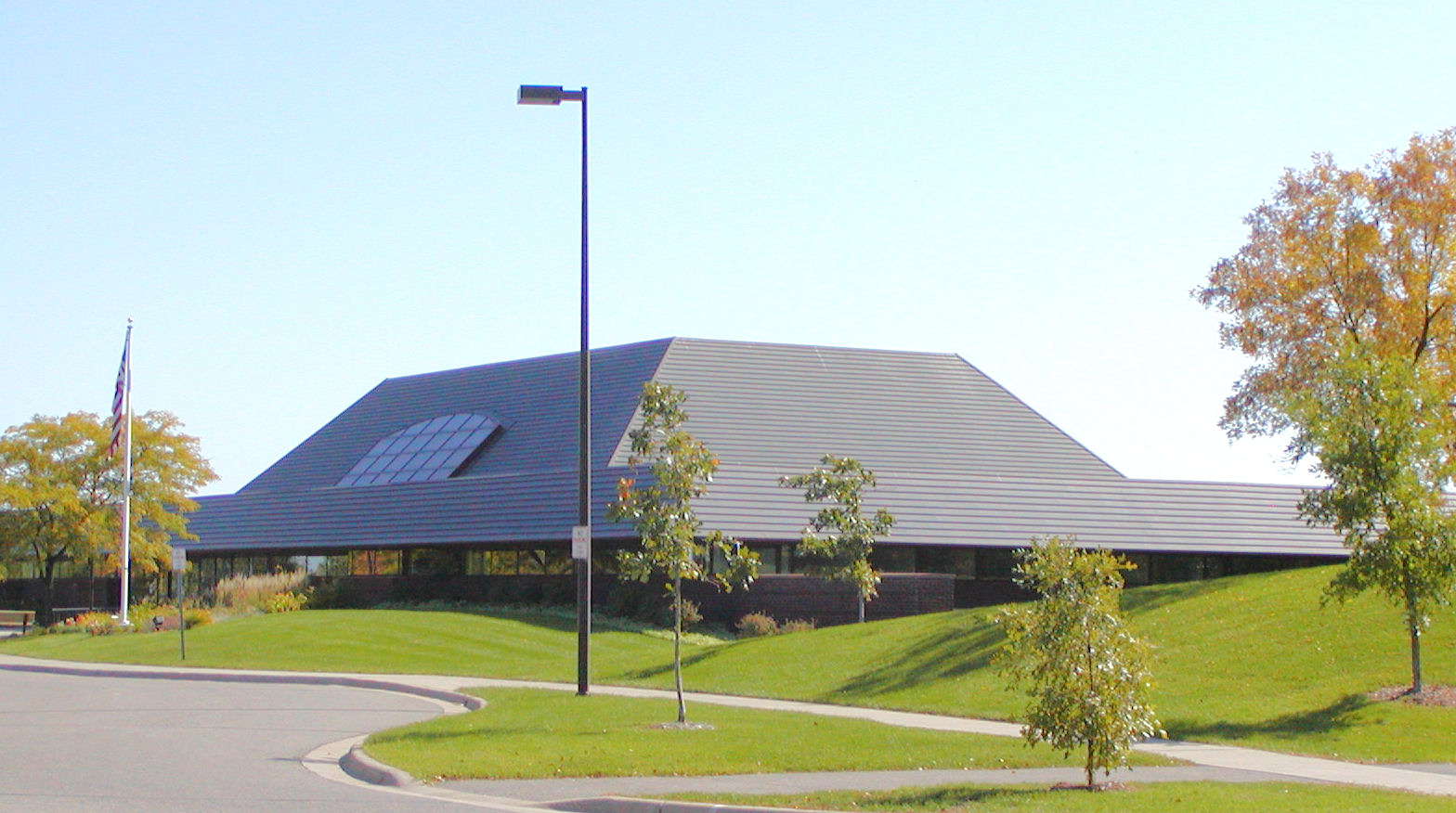
Wescott Library in Eagan houses the administrative offices of the library system

Dakota County Library is a public library in Dakota County, Minnesota, headquartered in the Wescott Library in Eagan. The system includes 10 locations.

== History of the Dakota County Library ==
=== Early history ===
Dakota County Library as it exists today is a combination of several smaller libraries. The earliest of these were the Farmington Library, established in 1871, and the Hastings Library, established in 1873. Both were established as subscription libraries, and were relatively short-lived projects, although they paved the way for municipally funded libraries in the early 20th century. The City of South St. Paul Library was established in 1916. It initially received a $10,000 grant from the Carnegie Foundation, but development of the library was halted due to the outbreak of World War I. In 1926, the library received municipal bond funding in the amount of $25,000 for the establishment of a library building, which opened in August 1927, as the first public library in Dakota County.

=== Era of growth ===
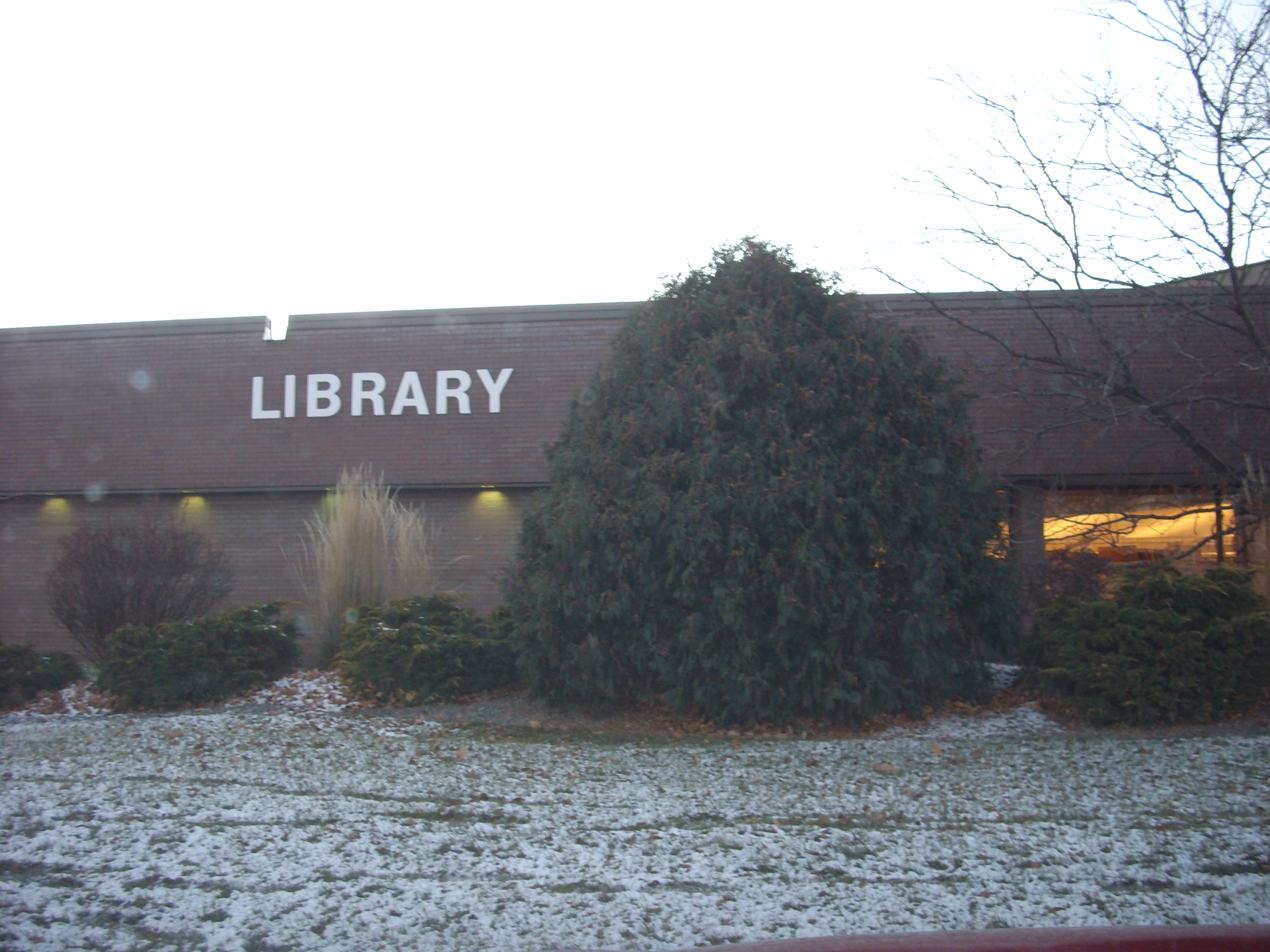
The Burnhaven Library in Burnsville

Bolstered by the post-World War II influx to suburban areas as well as the passage of the 1956 Congressional Library Services Act, public libraries in Dakota County were ready to expand. To maximize resources, the County entered into a partnership with its neighbor to the west, Scott County and in 1959, the Dakota-Scott Regional Library System was formed. Originally operated out of 2 classrooms in a Savage elementary school with 9 people on staff, the system quickly expanded, with the Farmington and Hastings libraries joining by the end of the year. By 1968, the system had opened a new library in Hastings, acquired a 6,000 book capacity bookmobile, purchased land off of County Road 42 in Burnsville for a new branch location and was using a storefront location in Burnsville as a temporary library to help alleviate demand on the other outlets. However, throughout this time, Dakota and Scott County had been growing apart from one another - both in terms of population growth and in their vision for the library's future. As a result, the assets of the collection were divided proportionately to county population and by December 31, 1968, the two-county system was dissolved.

=== Creation of Dakota County Library ===
Dakota County Library was formed on January 1, 1969. The early years were a time of cooperation and technological change. The system joined the Metropolitan Library Service Agency (MELSA) in 1970 and entered into a reciprocal borrowing agreement with the City of South St. Paul Library in 1975.

In 1971, the library made available for check out the first computer-created book catalog in Minnesota. Technological innovations continued with the opening of the Burnhaven library in 1974, which included record and cassette listening terminals. By the beginning of the 1980s, the Dakota County Library System had over 200,000 books and 175,000 patrons, and was entering a period of steady growth. 1981 saw the opening of the Wescott Library in Eagan, which has housed the system's administrative headquarters since its opening. Wescott was followed by the Galaxie Library in Apple Valley in 1990 and the Wentworth Library in West St. Paul in 1992. The Pleasant Hill Library in Hastings was built after a 1993 fire in the previous building caused 1 million USD in damage - including the destruction of an estimated 73,000 books. In 1995, a new "special service library" was opened in Farmington. Inver Glen Library in Inver Grove Heights and the Heritage Library in Lakeville both opened in 2000. The 9th library branch in Rosemount is the Robert Trail Library, which is housed in a 23,000-square-foot (2,100 m^{2}) facility and had approximately 45,000 volumes in its collection at its opening. The 10th library branch in South St. Paul was named the Kaposia Library, named after the Mdewakanton Dakota people in the regional Kaposia tribe. Kaposia Library opened in 2024 with 16,000 square feet.

== Dakota County Library today ==
=== Dakota County Library locations ===
The Dakota County Library is made up of 10 locations. The administrative headquarters are located in Eagan, Minnesota.

Locations include

- Robert Trail Library in Rosemount, current building opened in 2009
- Burnhaven Library in Burnsville, opened in 1974; was home to the system's bookmobile until bookmobile service was discontinued in 2010. Expected renovation in 2026 - 2027.
- Farmington Library in Farmington, current building opened in 1995.
- Galaxie Library in Apple Valley, opened in 1990.
- Heritage Library in Lakeville, opened in 2000.
- Inver Glen Library in Inver Grove Heights, opened in 2000.
- Pleasant Hill Library in Hastings, current building opened in 1994 to replace building that burned down in 1993.
- Kaposia Library in South St. Paul, opened in 2024. After the city of South St. Paul asked Dakota County to add the city library to the county system.
- Wentworth Library in West St. Paul, current building opened in 1992 to replace old West St. Paul Library. It was under renovation in 2025 which was finished the 5th of May 2026.
- Wescott Library in Eagan, opened in 1983, the year it replaced Burnhaven as the location of the system's administrative headquarters

Law library services are provided at the Apple Valley and Hastings libraries

=== System profile ===
- Dakota County Library serves an estimated 420,000 county residents, {As of 2010} 80% of whom currently live within three miles (5 km) of a county library.

In Person Visits	1,746,785
Virtual Visits to the Library Website and Catalog	2,405,061
Digital and Physical Items Checked Out	4,556,015
Active Borrowers	150,513
Program and Event Attendance	93,334
