= Metropolitan Library Service Agency =

Library consortium in St. Paul, Minnesota, U.S.

Coordinates: 44.947887°N 93.168434°W

- Location: Seven-county Twin Cities region, Minnesota, United States

Other information
- Website: www.melsa.org

The Metropolitan Library Service Agency (MELSA) is a regional library system in the Minneapolis–Saint Paul metropolitan area of Minnesota. It consists of eight library systems in seven counties, with a total of over one hundred member libraries. Library card holders at any member system may borrow materials from another MELSA member system.

MELSA provides numerous resources for its member libraries such as electronic books.

== Member Regional Library Systems ==
- Anoka County Library
- Carver County Library
- Dakota County Library
- Hennepin County Library
- Ramsey County Library
- Saint Paul Public Library
- Scott County Library
- Washington County Library
