= Saint Anthony Park, Saint Paul =

Coordinates: 44°58′52.81″N 93°11′40.21″W

Saint Anthony Park
- Neighborhood
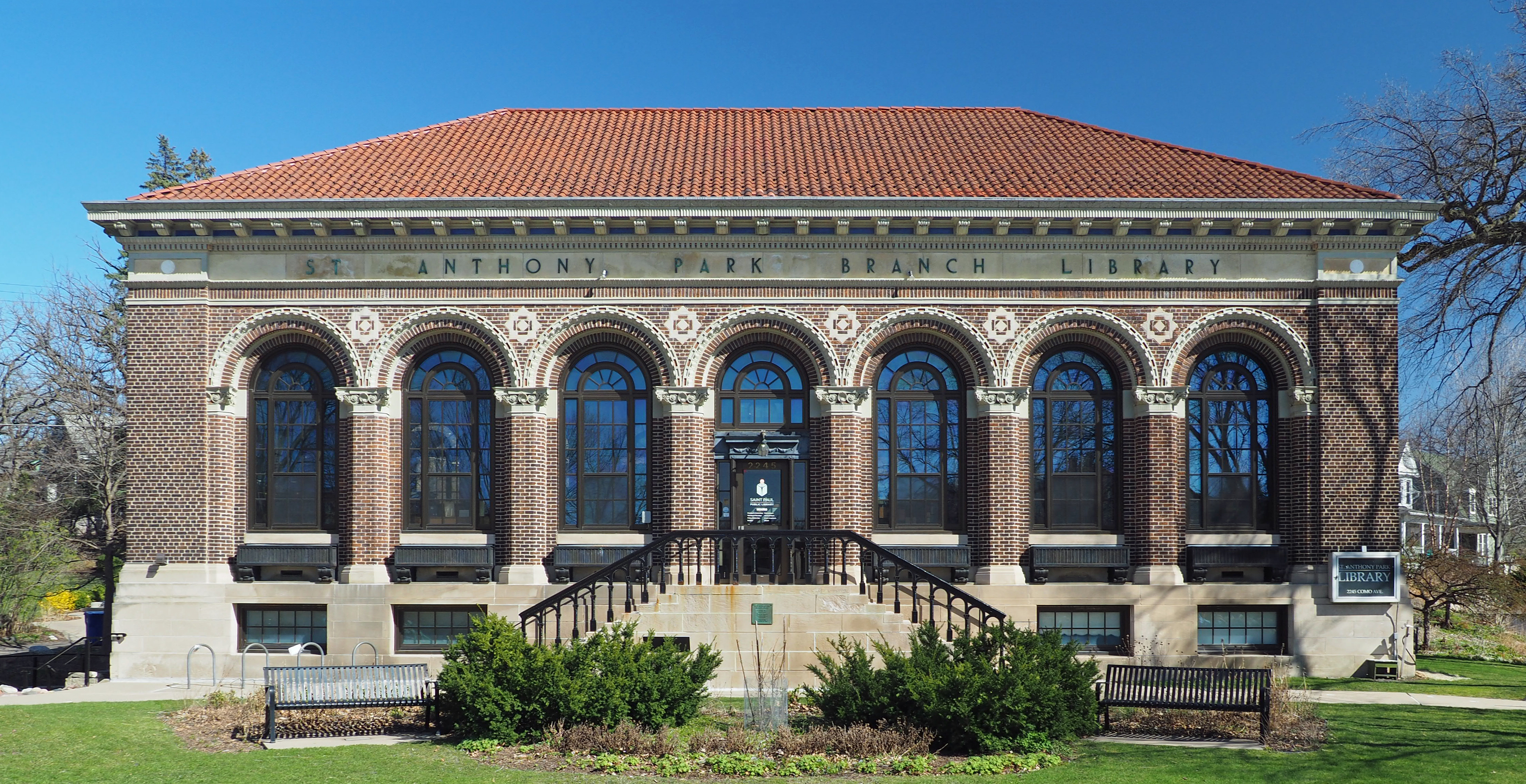
- The Saint Anthony Park Branch Library.
- Country: United States
- State: Minnesota
- County: Ramsey
- City: Saint Paul

Population (2010)
  - Total: 8,194
- Time zone: UTC-6 (CST)
  - Summer (DST): UTC-5 (CDT)
- Area code: 651
- Website: https://www.sapcc.org/

Saint Anthony Park is a neighborhood in northwest Saint Paul, Minnesota. It is adjacent to the University of Minnesota's St. Paul Campus (in Falcon Heights), bordering Prospect Park, Minneapolis on the west, the Minnesota State Fairgrounds on the east (in Falcon Heights), and the suburbs of Falcon Heights and Lauderdale to the north.

== History ==
Saint Anthony Park was formed by the merger of two neighborhoods. North Saint Anthony Park, centered around Como Avenue, was originally an independent city established in the late 19th century as a railroad suburb, consisting of estates for the wealthy of Minneapolis and Saint Paul. South Saint Anthony Park is centered around Raymond Avenue near University Avenue, and was built mostly as workers' housing for people employed on the many nearby railroads. Although the two areas have very different histories and housing stock, they have grown more similar over the 20th and 21st centuries due to their proximity and convenience for commuters to both downtowns and to the University of Minnesota. Both are now middle-class neighborhoods with diverse populations and large numbers of professors and academics.

Saint Anthony Park was home to three Minnesota governors (William Rainey Marshall, 1866–70; Andrew Ryan McGill, 1887–1889; and Elmer L. Andersen, 1961–63), all members of the Republican Party. In the middle of the 20th century, Saint Anthony Park was one of Saint Paul's most conservative neighborhoods. Today, it is one of the city's strongest neighborhoods for the Minnesota DFL.

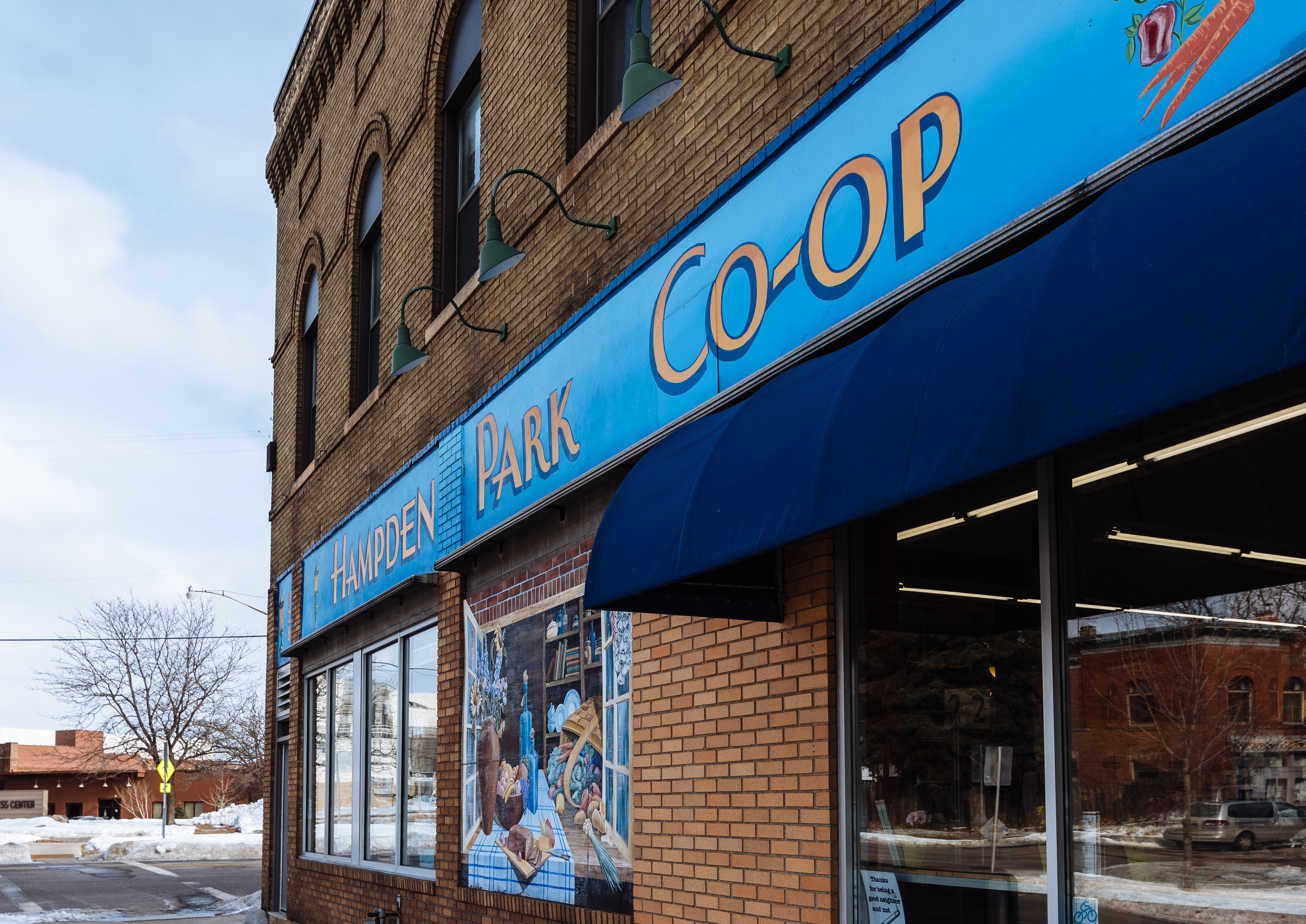
The Hampden Park Co-op, a landmark in the South St. Anthony Park neighborhood.

The St. Anthony Park Community Council, which represents the neighborhood in an official capacity before the city, is among Saint Paul's oldest neighborhood organizations. It was formed in the early 1960s in response to pressure from the St. Paul Port Authority and others to expand industrial development into residential areas of South Saint Anthony Park, as well as a perceived decline in the standard of housing in the tonier areas of North Saint Anthony Park. The organization allowed women to join as voting members in 1972, and a few years later became recognized by the City of Saint Paul as part of its District Council system.

The neighborhood's largest park, Langford Park, is named for former Saint Anthony Park resident Nathaniel P. Langford, who helped create the world's first national park, Yellowstone National Park. Other well-known former Saint Anthony Park residents include author, humorist and radio show host Garrison Keillor; Nobel Peace Prize-winning scientist Norman Borlaug; Nobel Prize-winning author Saul Bellow; children's author Carol Ryrie Brink; John F. Kennedy Chairman of Council of Economic Advisors Walter Heller; physician, poet, etymologist, and essayist Lewis Thomas; psychologist B.F. Skinner; presidential advisor Eugene Z. Young; and architect Sarah Susanka.

Saint Anthony Park hosts its own Independence Day parade, which is followed by an all-day, all-neighborhood party in Langford Park. The 9.6-acre (39,000 m^{2}) park includes a recreation center offering hockey, baseball, basketball, indoor and outdoor soccer and tennis, and contains a playground, two tennis courts, indoor and outdoor basketball courts, and a baseball field that is flooded in the winter to make two hockey rinks and one general skating rink.

== Transportation ==
The Metro Green Line light rail, which opened on June 14, 2014, serves the neighborhood with stops on University Avenue at Raymond Avenue and Westgate. Minnesota State Highway 280 runs through the neighborhood on its western border.

== Education ==
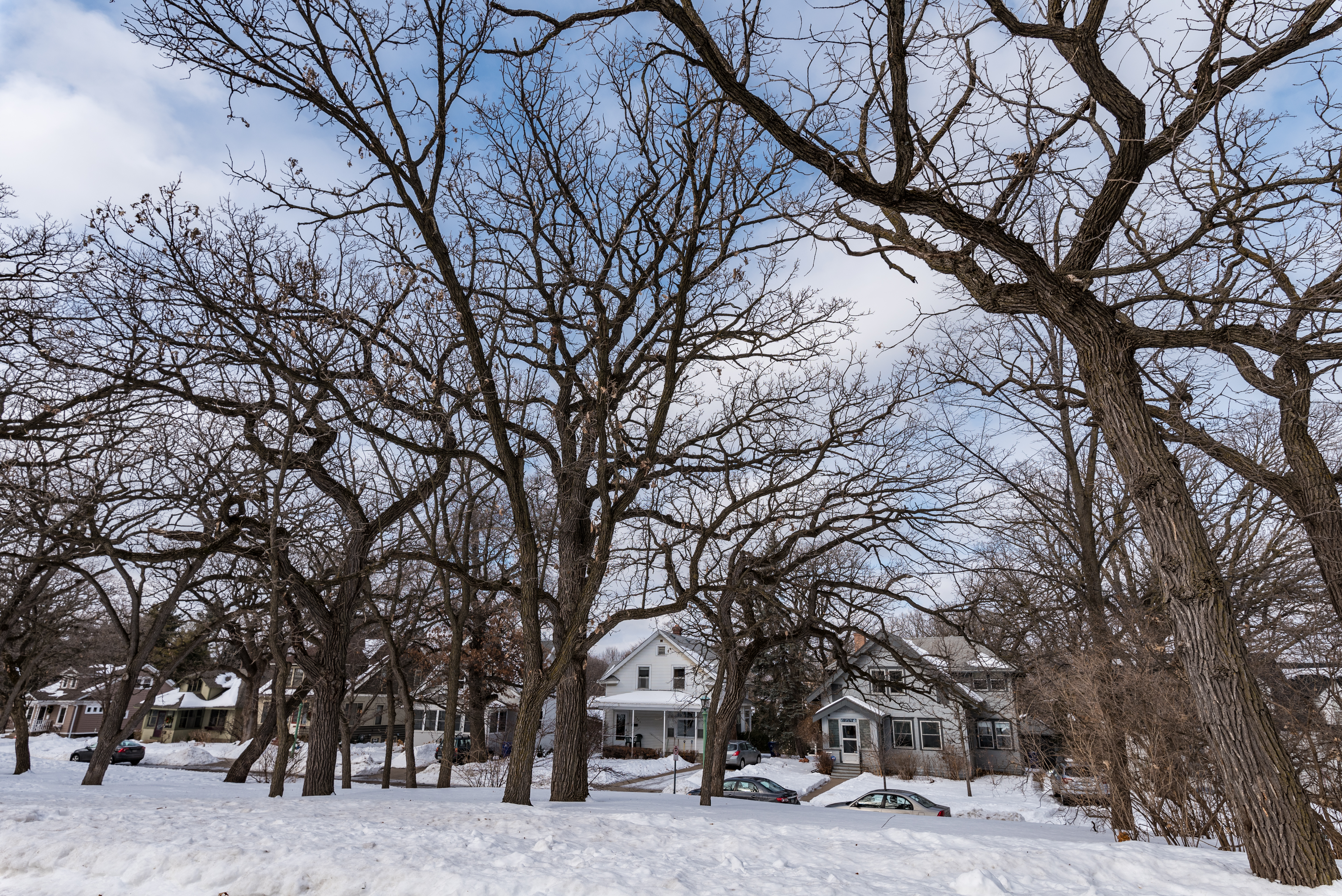
Commonwealth Park, in North St. Anthony Park, during winter.

The St. Anthony Park Branch Library, a Carnegie library built in 1917, is listed on the National Register of Historic Places and was expanded in 1999 with a children's wing. St. Anthony Park Elementary School and Murray Middle School (formerly Murray Junior High School, and before that Murray High School) are the schools in the neighborhood. Luther Seminary is also in St. Anthony Park.
