= Arlington Hills Library =

- U.S. National Register of Historic Places
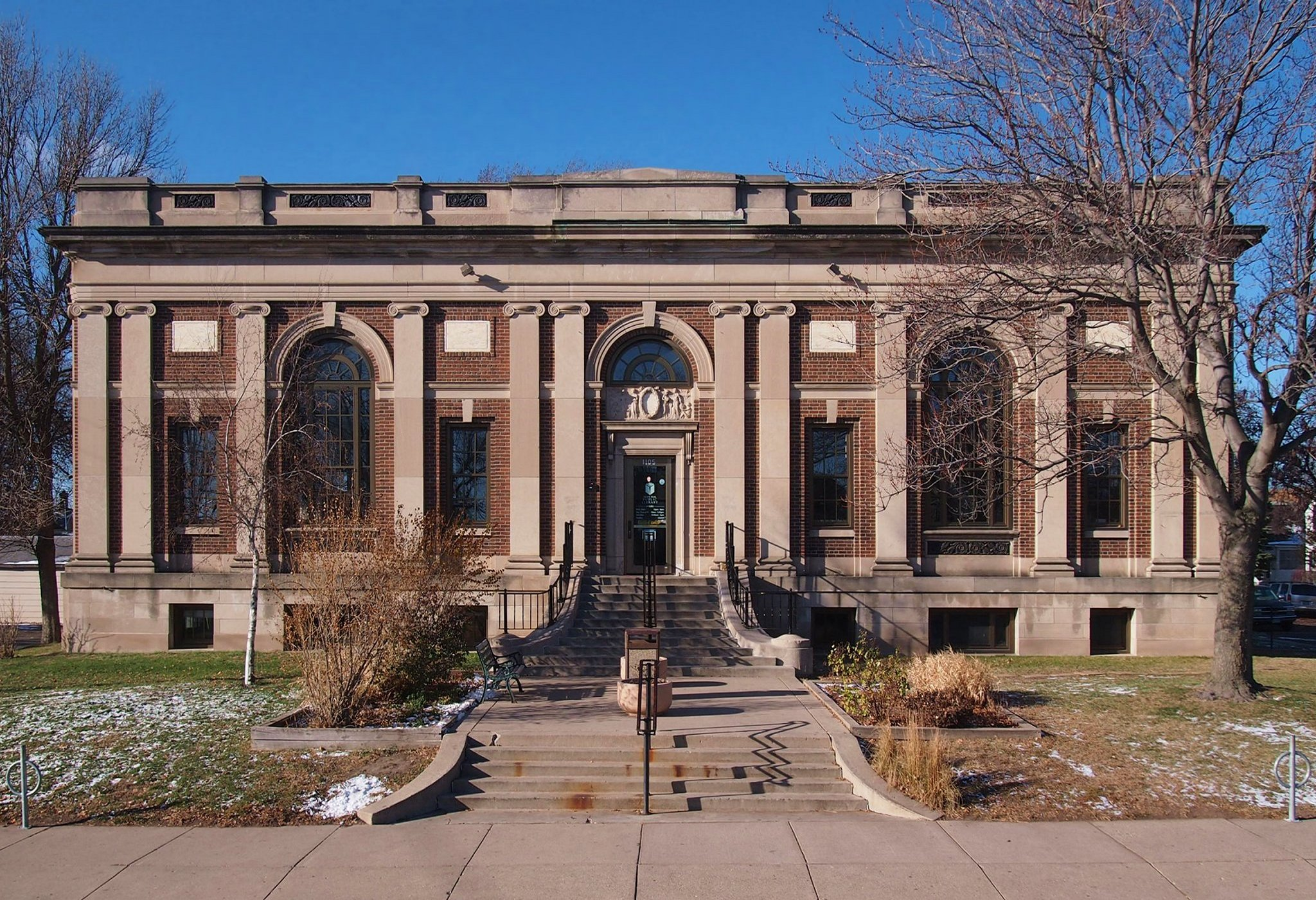
- Arlington Hills Library in 2012

- Location within Minnesota Location within the United States
- Location: 1105 Greenbrier Street; Saint Paul, Minnesota
- Coordinates: 44°58′28″N 93°4′16″W
- Built: 1916
- Built by: Cameron & Company
- Architect: Charles A. Hausler
- Architectural style: Beaux-Arts
- MPS: Carnegie Libraries of St. Paul TR
- NRHP reference No.: 84001660
- Added to NRHP: February 10, 1984

The Arlington Hills Library is a 1916 Beaux Arts library building designed by Charles A. Hausler. It is one of three Carnegie Libraries in Saint Paul, Minnesota, United States. It is listed on the National Register of Historic Places. It served as the Arlington Hills Public Library, a branch of the St. Paul Public Library, from 1917 until its relocation in 2014. The building is located in the Payne-Phalen neighborhood.

== Architectural features ==
The rectangular footprint of the building allowed two large reading rooms on the main level, and an auditorium and other smaller rooms in the basement. The eighty-foot symmetrical facade features seven bays, three of which have large stone arches over windows or the doorway, and four which have rectangular windows and plaques. The facade also has twelve pilasters with Ionic capitals. This facade is topped with a stone parapet with pilasters and grill-work, which rests on a classical entablature.

== Relocation ==
The public library closed for relocation on Saturday, March 15, 2014 and reopened at 1200 Payne Ave. on May 22, 2014, as part of the Arlington Hills Community Center in collaboration with the parks and recreation department. The building went up for sale by the City of Saint Paul for adaptive reuse that would maintain the historic structure.

=== East Side Freedom Library ===
The nonprofit East Side Freedom Library signed a lease with the city in March, 2014, and will feature a reference book collection along with classrooms and meeting spaces for cultural events. The East Side Freedom Library was expected to open in June, 2014, but was delayed due to a need to replace the roof of the building. The organization is fundraising and seeking grants to complete this and other work on the building. The East Side Freedom Library began offering public programming in July, 2014.
