= Riverview Branch Library =

- U.S. National Register of Historic Places
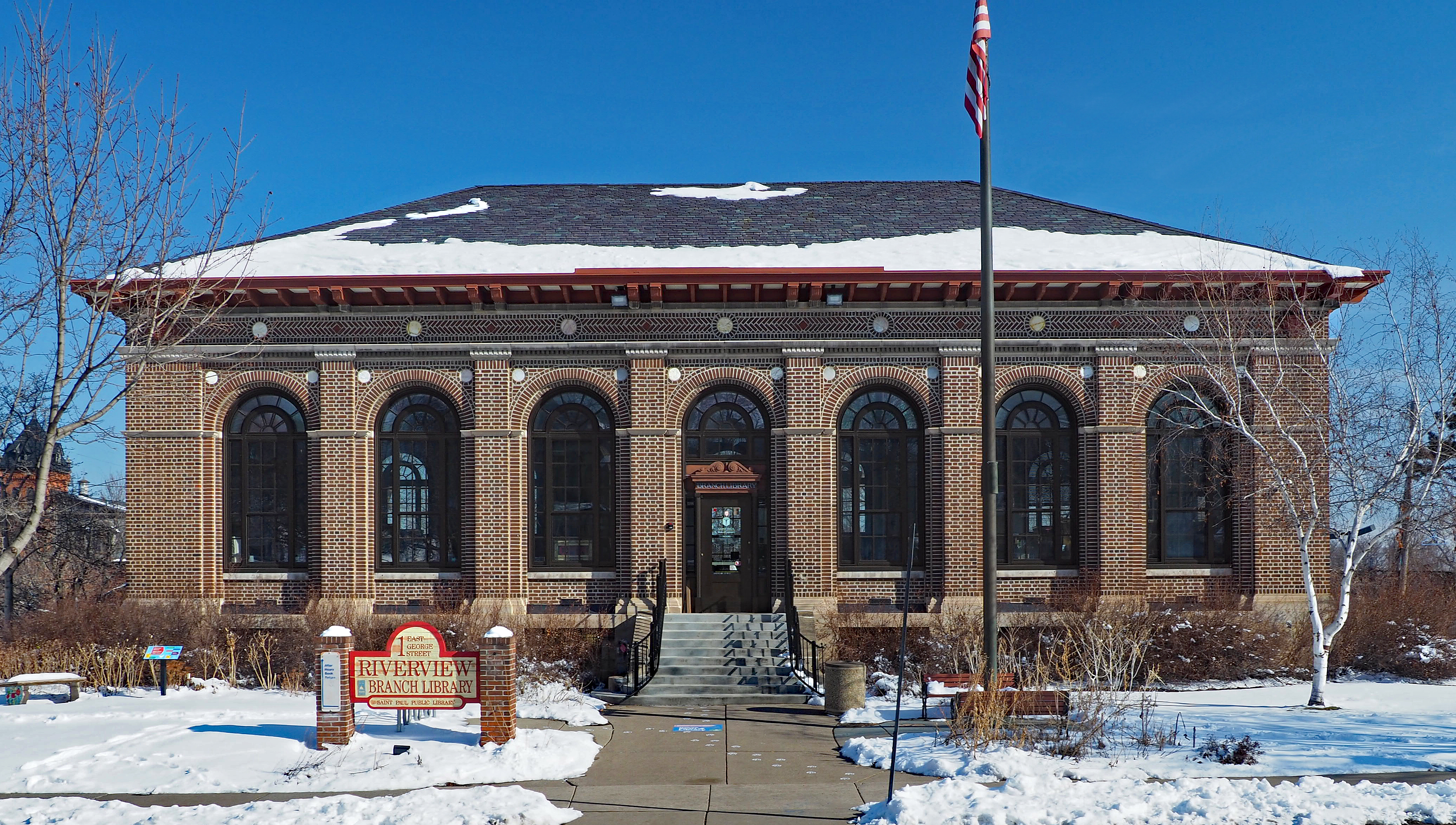
- Riverview Branch Library viewed from the south

- Location within Minnesota Location within the United States
- Location: 1 East George Street, Saint Paul, Minnesota
- Coordinates: 44°55′47.7″N 93°5′5″W
- Area: Less than one acre
- Built: 1916
- Built by: Cameron and Company
- Architect: Charles A. Hausler
- Architectural style: Beaux-Arts
- MPS: Carnegie Libraries of St. Paul TR
- NRHP reference No.: 84001672
- Added to NRHP: February 10, 1984

Riverview Branch Library is a branch of the Saint Paul Public Library serving the West Side neighborhood of Saint Paul, Minnesota, United States. It is a Carnegie library built in 1916. It was listed on the National Register of Historic Places in 1984 for having local significance in the themes of architecture and education. It was nominated for being one of only three Carnegie libraries built in Saint Paul, one of the first projects of Saint Paul city architect Charles A. Hausler, one of the last American libraries built with Carnegie Foundation funding, and for being an important neighborhood landmark in Beaux-Arts style. Many immigrants to Saint Paul lived on the West Side and the library was designed to serve them. Architecture critic Larry Millett noted a large amount of natural light and called it one of the "West Side's finest buildings".

== See also ==
- List of Carnegie libraries in Minnesota
- National Register of Historic Places listings in Ramsey County, Minnesota
