= St. Anthony Park Branch Library =

- U.S. National Register of Historic Places
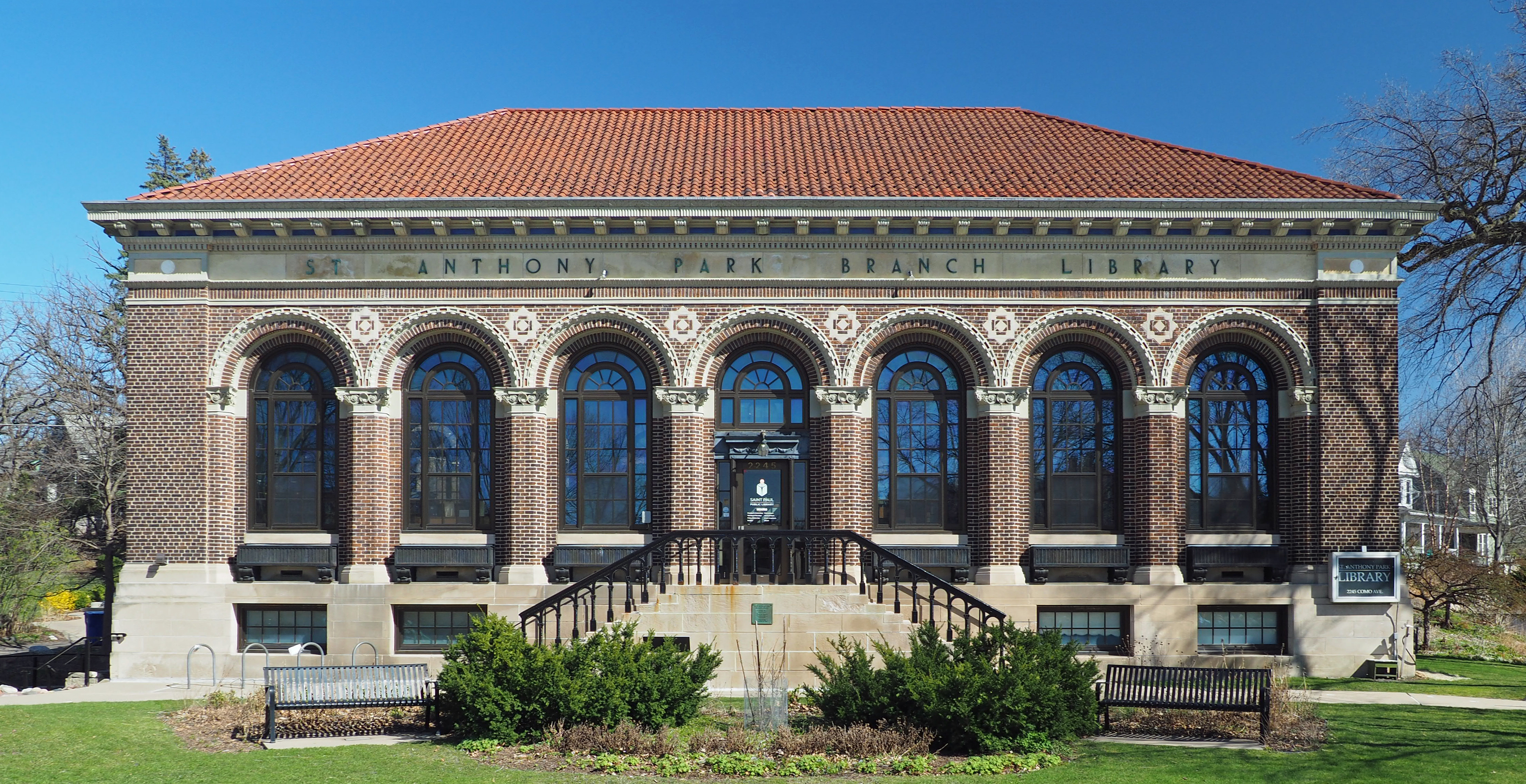
- St. Anthony Park Branch Library from the northwest

- Location within Minnesota Location within the United States
- Location: 2245 West Como Avenue; Saint Paul, Minnesota
- Coordinates: 44°58′52″N 93°11′37″W
- Built: 1917
- Architect: Charles A. Hausler
- MPS: Carnegie Libraries of St. Paul TR
- NRHP reference No.: 84001675
- Added to NRHP: February 11, 1988

The St. Anthony Park Branch Library is a branch of the Saint Paul Public Library in Saint Paul, Minnesota, United States. A Carnegie library built in 1917, it is on the National Register of Historic Places. In 1999 a rotunda was built on to the back of the building. This new section houses the branch's children's collection, one of the largest in Saint Paul.

Although one of Saint Paul's smaller library branches at 10,590 square feet (984 m^{2}), the St. Anthony Park Branch circulated 265,776 items in 2005, making it the third-busiest branch in the city. The on-site collection numbered 55,175 items that same year. The branch is open 44 hours per week, Monday to Saturday.

The library branch is considered an icon of the Saint Anthony Park neighborhood. Primary user groups are neighborhood residents, students and faculty from the nearby University of Minnesota's St. Paul Campus and Luther Seminary, and students from two nearby public schools. One-third of users come from Minneapolis and suburban Ramsey County. To serve the many U of M graduate students and their families from who are from Asia, the branch has the city's primary collection of Chinese and Korean language materials.

The St. Anthony Park Branch has its own community advocacy group, the St. Anthony Park Library Association (SAPLA), in addition to the overall Friends of the St. Paul Public Library. The annual St. Anthony Park Arts Festival began on the library's front lawn and now sprawls for more than a block. During the festival, which is the first Saturday in June, the library holds a large used book sale.
