= Saint Paul Public Library =

Library system in Saint Paul, Minnesota, U.S.

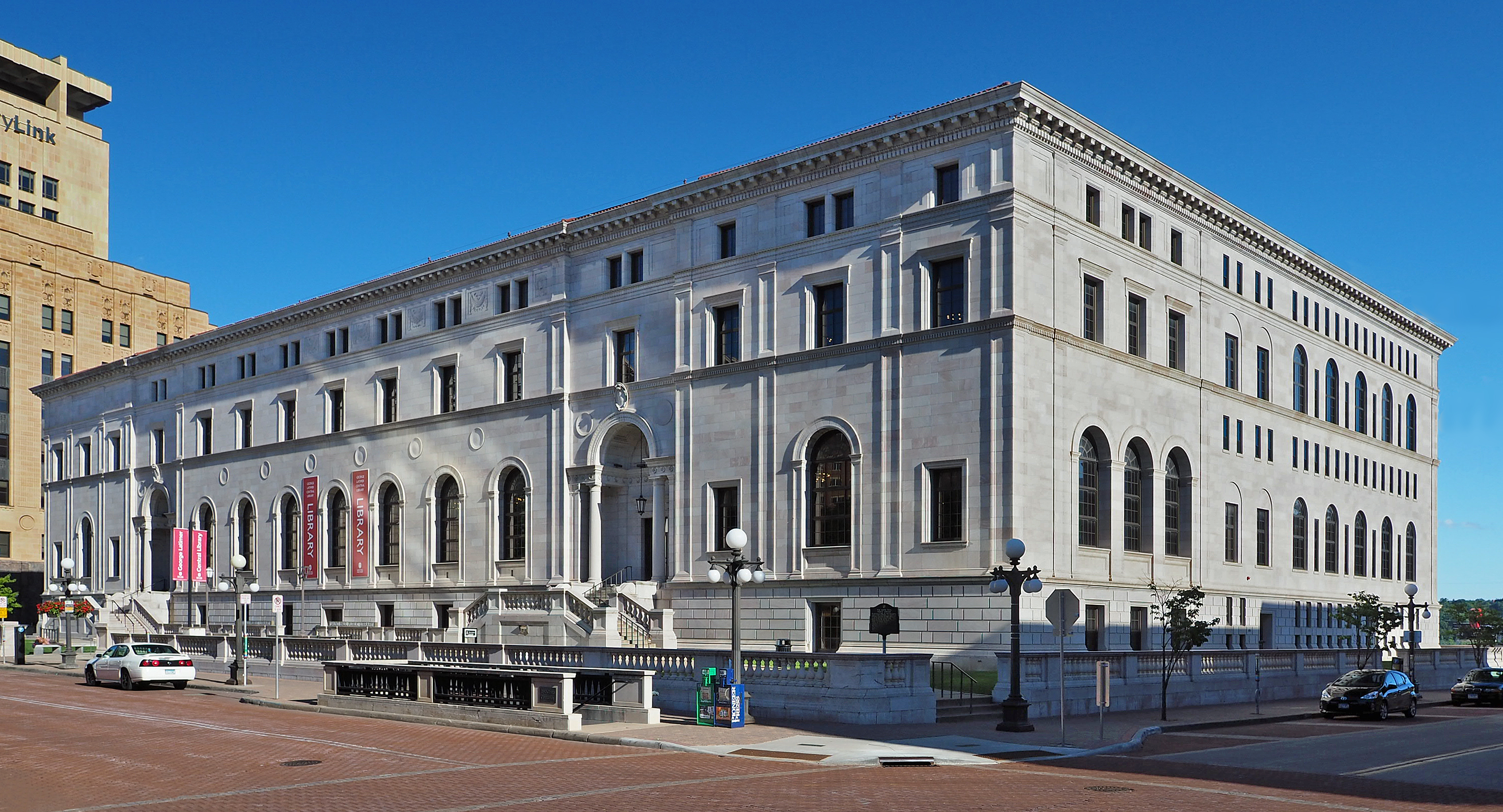
- George Latimer Central Library
- 44°56′38″N 93°5′48″W
- Location: 90 West 4th Street, Saint Paul, Minnesota, U.S.
- Established: 1914; 112 years ago

Other information
- Website: www.sppl.org
- George Latimer Central Library
- U.S. National Register of Historic Places
- Location: 90 West 4th Street, Saint Paul, Minnesota
- Built: 1914–17
- Architect: Electus Litchfield
- Architectural style: Renaissance Revival
- NRHP reference No.: 75001017
- Added to NRHP: September 11, 1975

The Saint Paul Public Library is a library system serving the residents of Saint Paul, Minnesota, United States. The library system includes a Central Library, twelve branch locations, and a bookmobile. It is a member of the Metropolitan Library Service Agency, a consortium of eight Twin Cities library systems.

== History ==
=== Background ===
The Saint Paul Public Library system traces its beginnings to 1856 when the newly formed YMCA opened a reading room. The following year, both the Saint Paul Library Association and the Mercantile Library Association also were organized. These early efforts all merged in 1863 into the Saint Paul Library Association.

In 1879, under the leadership of Alexander Ramsey, the Library Association proposed that the City accept responsibility for their collections and establish it as a free public library. Finally, on September 7, 1882, the city council approved an appropriation of $5,000 to establish the Saint Paul Public Library. By this date, the collection had grown to include 8,051 books.

In the following years, the library grew rapidly. As early as 1890, there were calls for the construction of a new building. Instead, in 1900, the library moved to the old Market Hall, located on Seventh Street. Many civic leaders continued to push for the construction of a new building, but the library remained in the Market Hall until a fire in 1915 destroyed the entire building, including the library and most of its collection of 158,000 books. At the time of the fire, construction of the new Central Library was already underway.

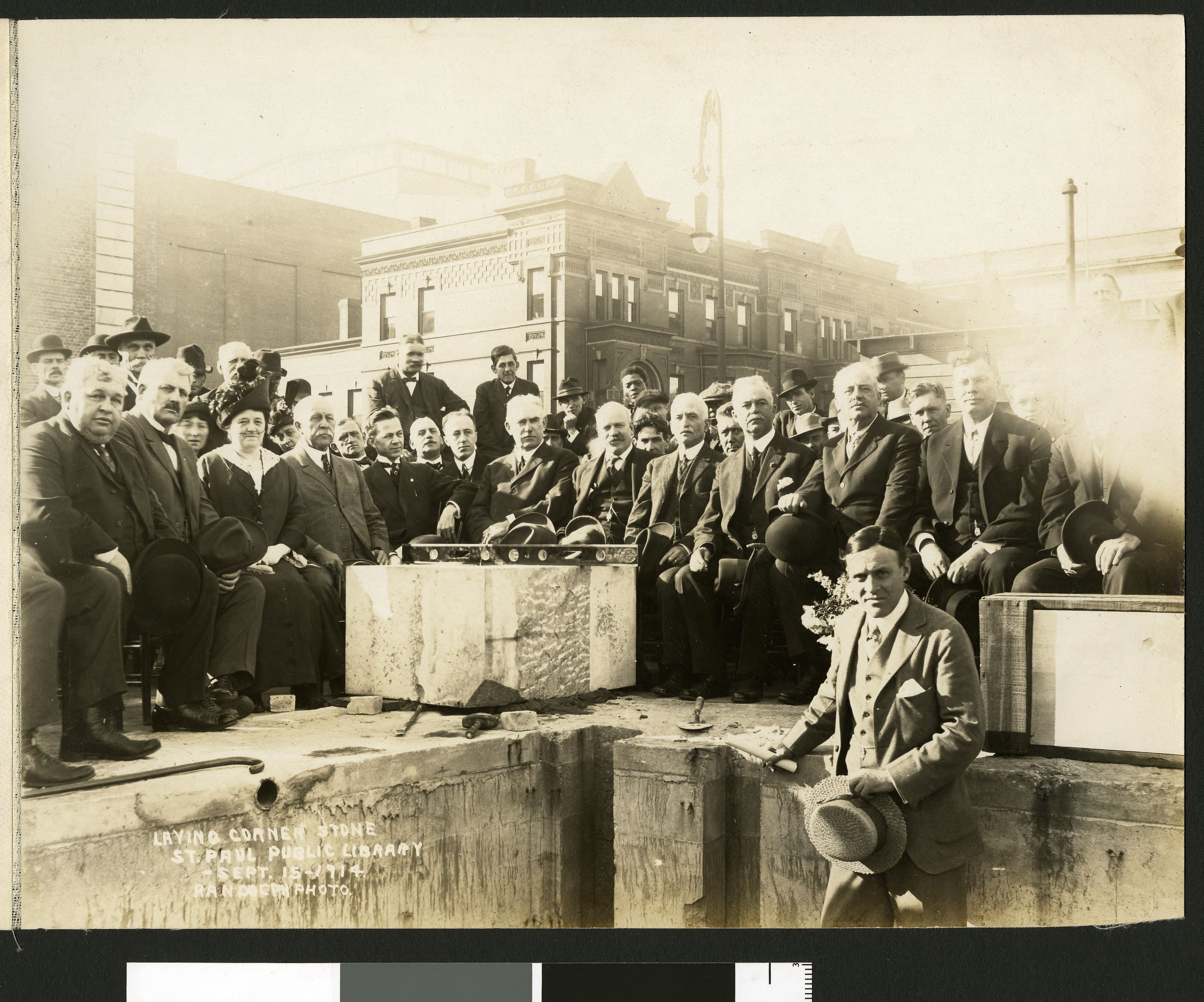
Laying the cornerstone for the Central Library, 1914

Planning for the new Central Library had occurred well before the 1915 fire. Under the leadership of Mayor Lawler in 1909, serious work began on building a new Library. A site was chosen on Rice Park, and in 1910, the library board began discussing how to raise the $500,000 it was estimated the new building would cost.

By 1912, railroad baron James J. Hill had offered to contribute $700,000 specifically for the construction and endowment of a reference library attached to the public library. Almost simultaneously, $100,000 toward the project was raised through a subscription campaign, $30,000 was received through a bequest from Greenleaf Clark, and the state legislature authorized the sale of $600,000 in bonds for the construction of the new facility. By the fall of 1912, the library board had hired Charles Soule, a Boston library consultant, to assist in planning the new facility. Ground was broken for Central Library in 1914. Ultimately, the entire building, including the Hill Reference Library, was erected at a cost of approximately $1.5 million.

=== Expansion ===
The Central Library opened in 1917. In that same year, three Carnegie library branches opened – Arlington Hills Library, Riverview Branch Library, and Saint Anthony Park. All four buildings are still in operation as libraries. The Central Library has been listed on the National Register of Historic Places since 1975.

The library started an extension division in the 1920s provided books for various public schools in Ramsey County outside of Saint Paul. This division became the Ramsey County Library in 1951.

Expansion of the Saint Paul Public Library continued in 1930, when the Hamline and Merriam Park libraries opened. Both branches were made possible by a bequest from the estate of Henry Hale. In the 1970s the Carnegie library began to sink so In 1993, after the demolition of the old building, a new 14,500 square foot Merriam Park library opened in the same location at a cost of $2.7 million.

In 1945, the Friends of the Saint Paul Public Library was formed to encourage and stimulate use and support of the library.

The 1950s saw three more branches open: Rice Street in 1952, Highland Park in 1954, and Hayden Heights in 1955. The Highland Park library was remodeled and enlarged in 1975, then closed again for six months in 1995 for further expansion and conjunction to the Hillcrest Recreation Center. Groundbreaking for a new Hayden Heights library commenced on August 23, 1977 across the street from the original location. The new building opened in 1979. In 2002, a new, $3.7 million Rice Street library opened. At 12,300 square feet, it was nearly three times the size of the original building.

The Centre Theater on University Avenue was remodeled and opened as the Lexington branch in 1967 the old theater building served the library from 1967 to 2006 In 1970, the Sun Ray library opened.

The 21st century saw further changes to the library system. The Central Library closed in October 2000 to undergo a $16 million renovation project and re-opened on October 5, 2002. In 2004, the Dayton's Bluff branch opened in the new Library and Learning Center of Metropolitan State University. Replacing the Lexington branch, the Rondo Community Outreach Library opened in 2006 in a mixed-use facility including 98 housing units. Groundbreaking on a combined library and recreation center in the Payne-Phalen neighborhood took place on July 26, 2012. The new facility replaced the Arlington Hills Library and was dubbed the Arlington Hills Community Center, which opened on May 22, 2014. The Sun Ray and Highland Park locations closed on December 2, 2013, for extensive renovations, and reopened in fall of 2014. The Central Library was renamed "George Latimer Central Library" in honor of the former mayor of Saint Paul on June 10, 2014.

== Gallery ==
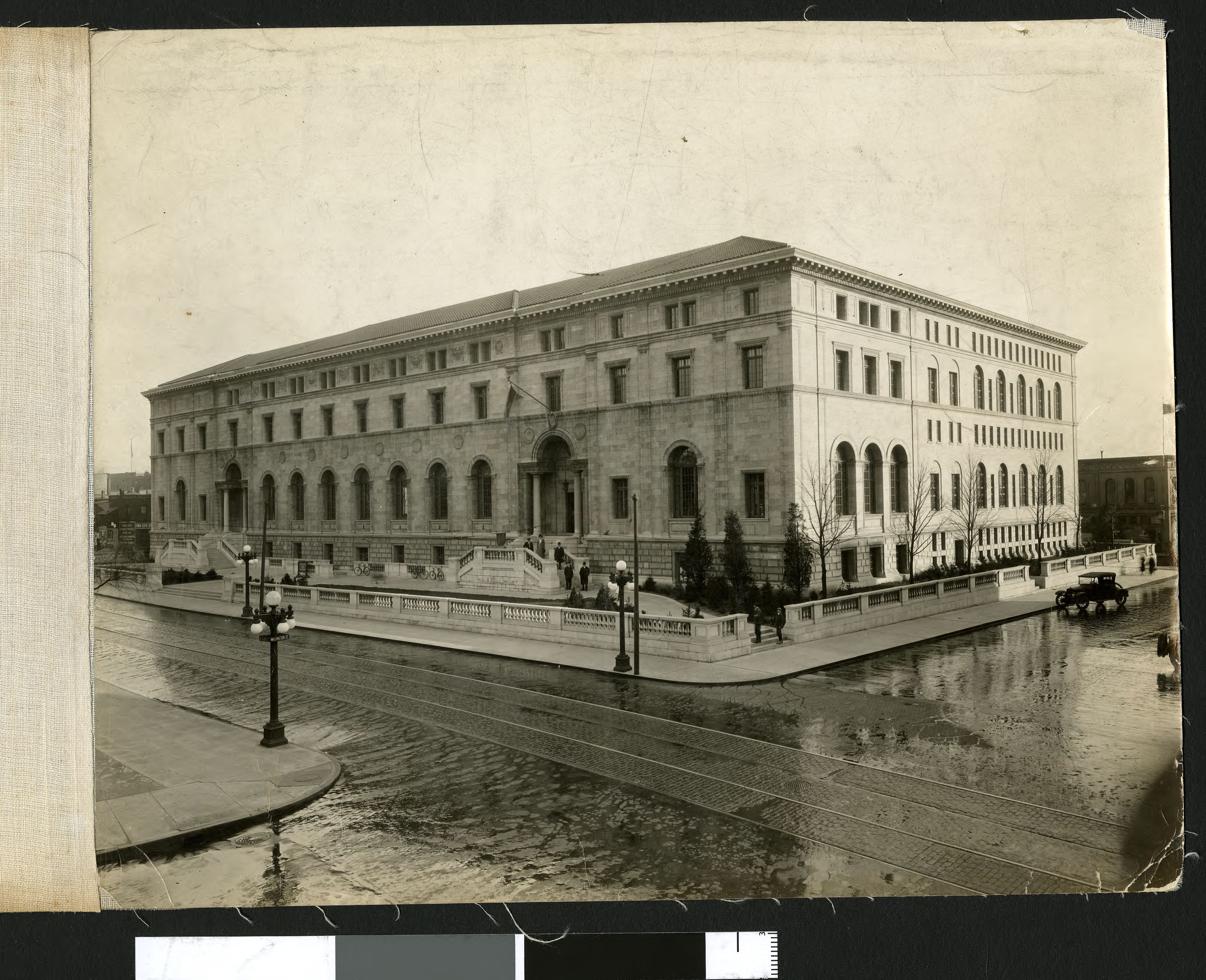
Central Library

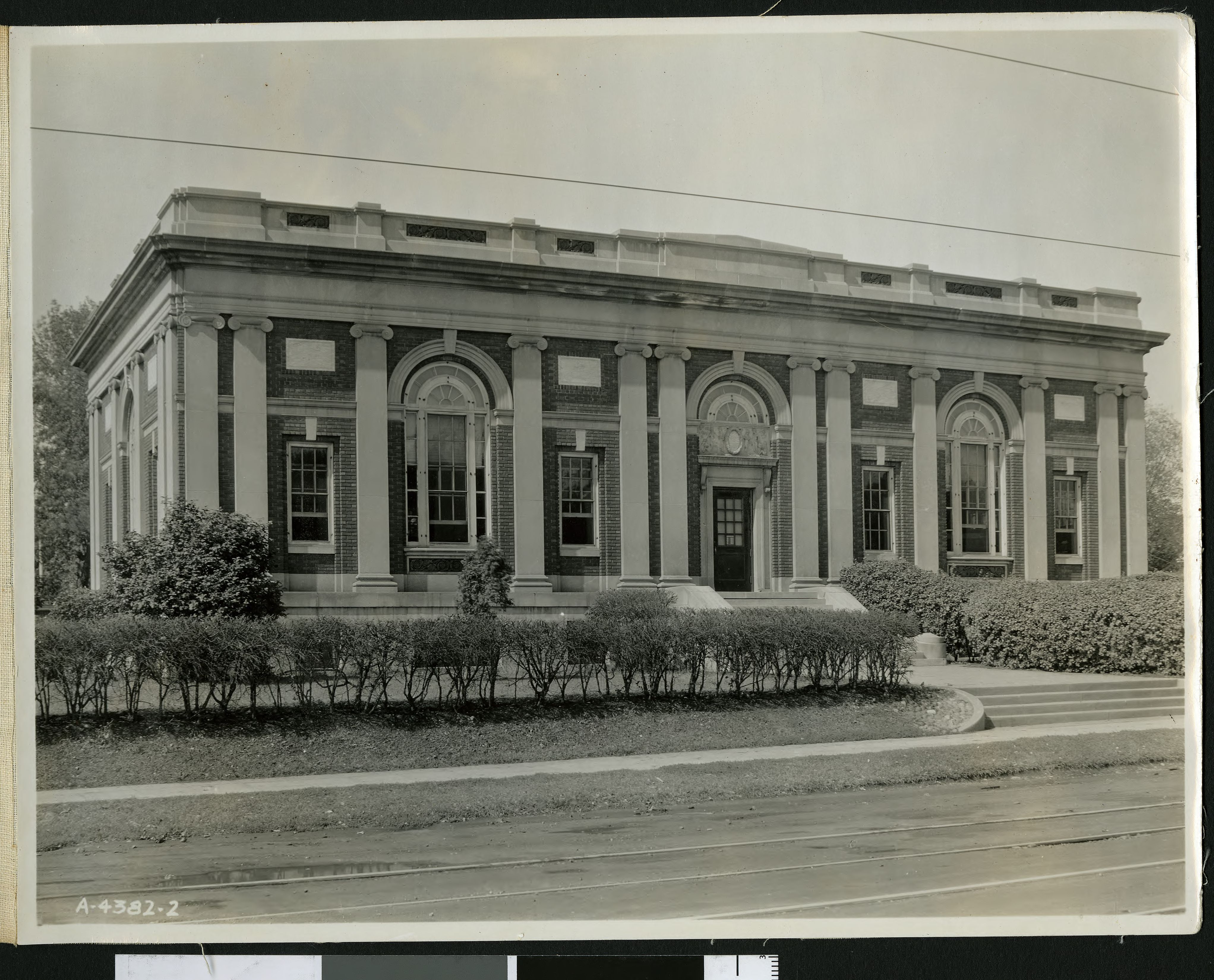
Arlington Hills Branch Library

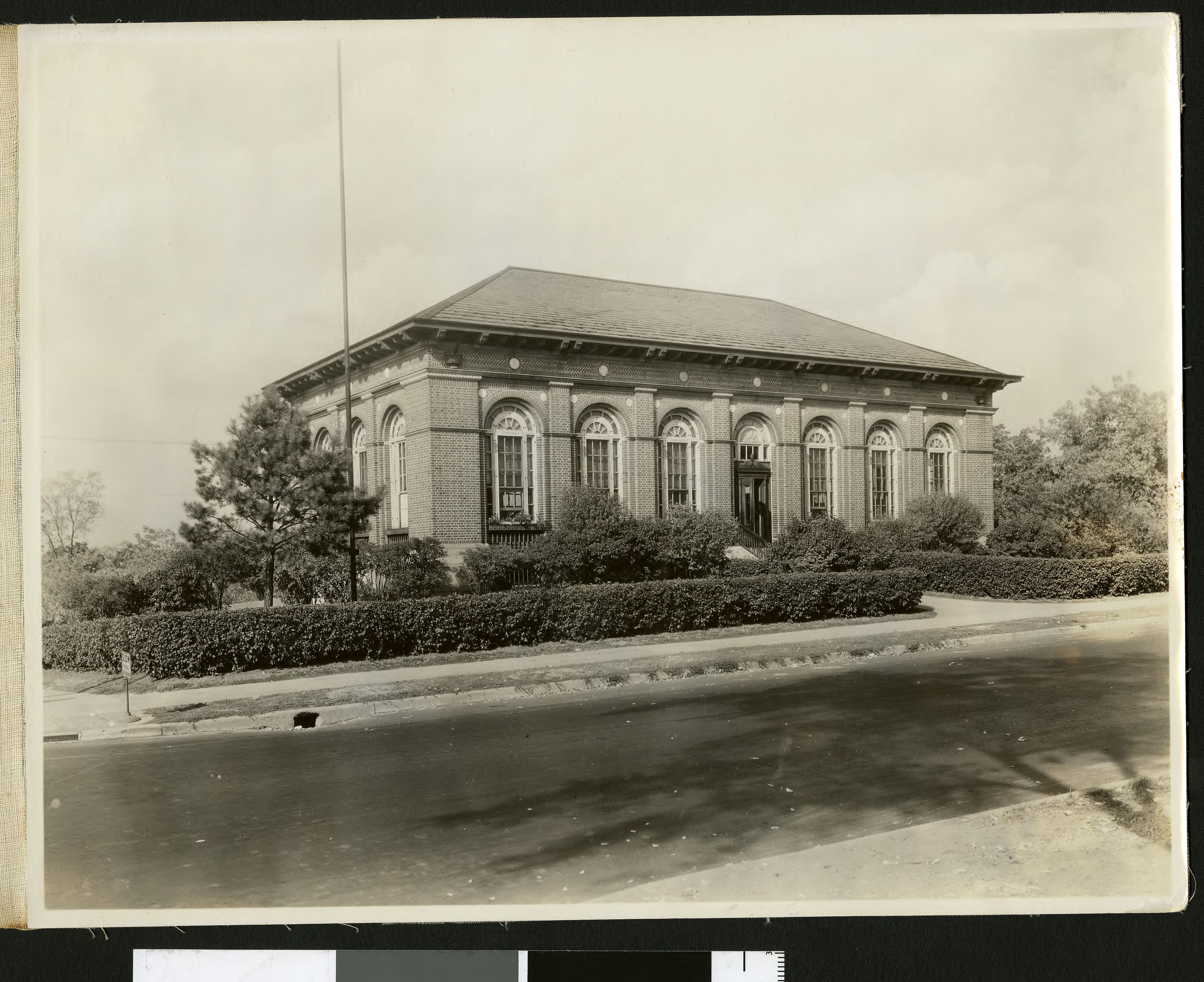
Riverview Branch Library

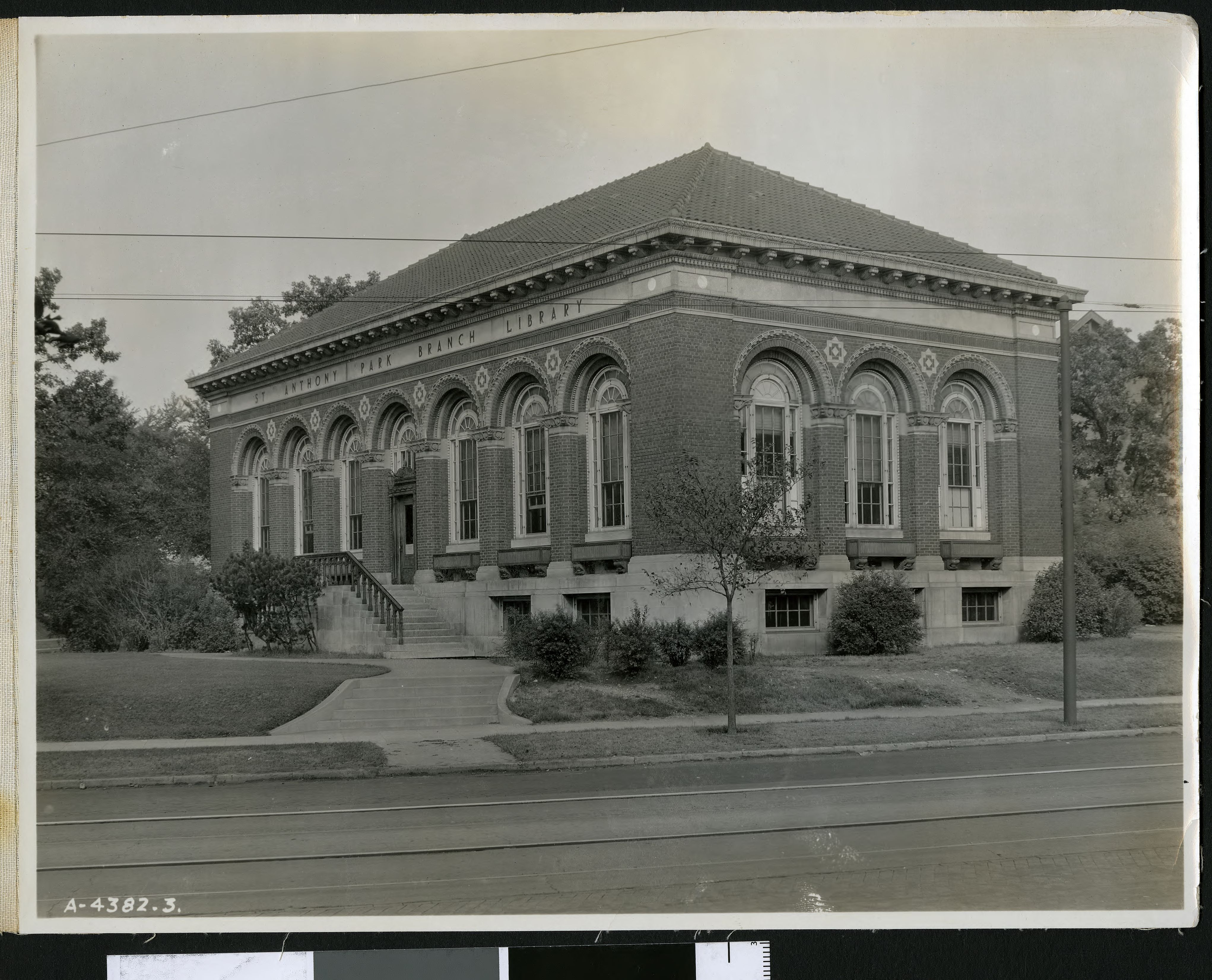
St. Anthony Park Branch Library

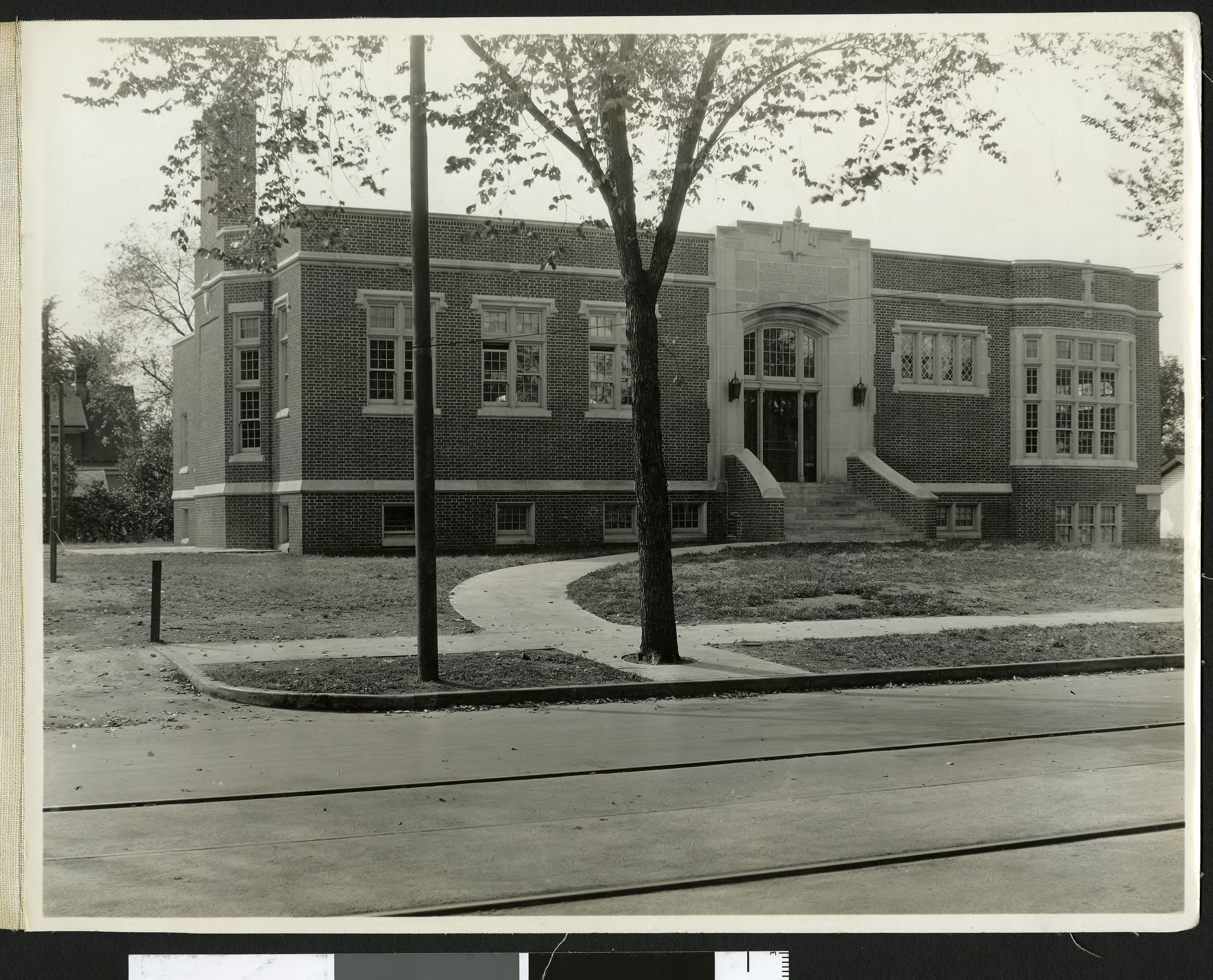
Hamline Midway Branch Library

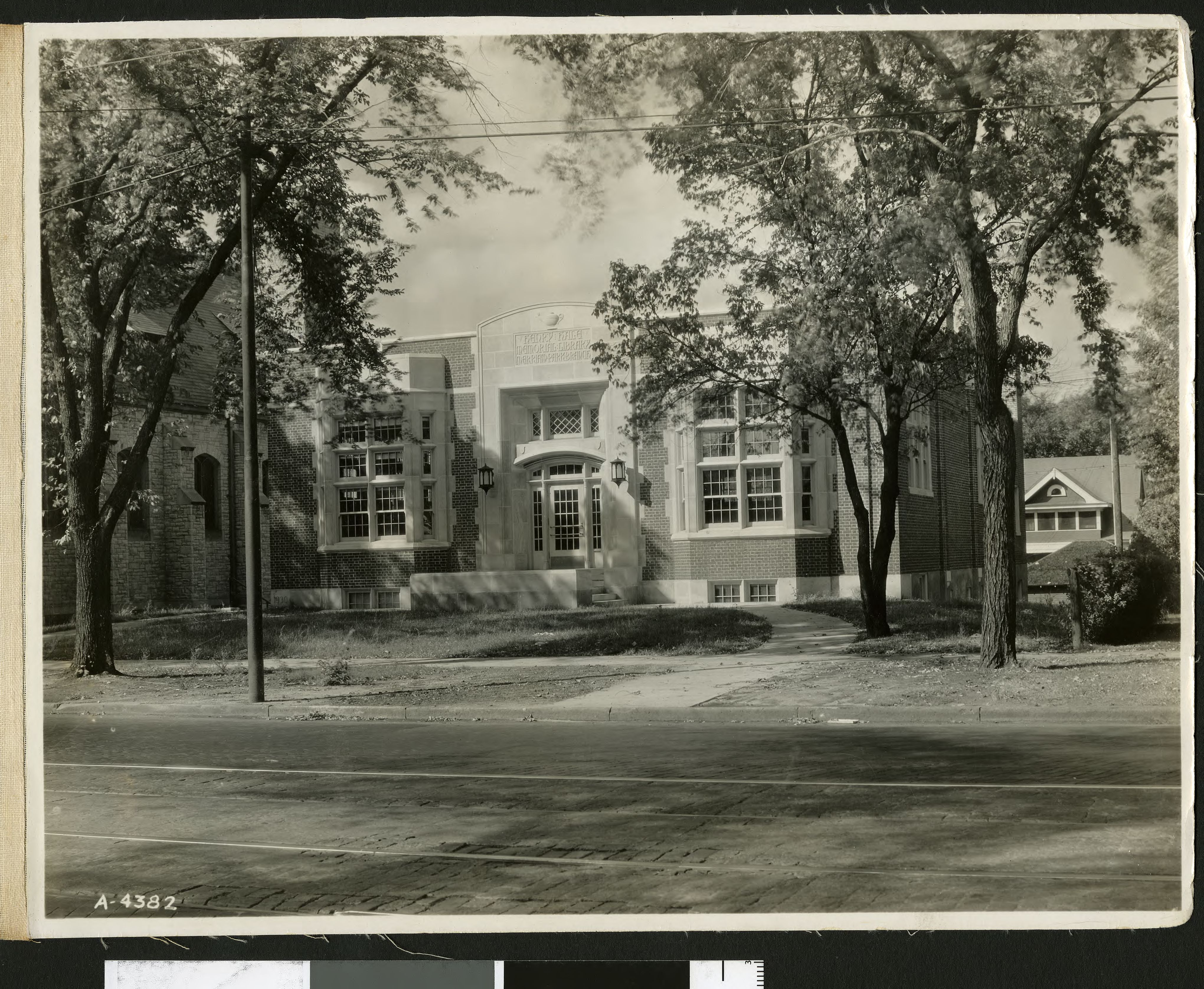
Merriam Park Branch Library

== Racial Equity Initiative ==
In 2014, the library launched the Saint Paul Public Library Racial Equity Initiative in conjunction with the Saint Paul Racial Equity Initiative. The initiative entailed a number of changes in policy, which affected its workforce and services in relation to people of color. The library was recognized as a 2016 innovator by the Urban Libraries Council and was presented with the council's Equity Award in October 2016. The library also launched a "Resources on Race" libguide.

The library has commissioned and published children's books in Karen, Amharic, and Oromo because of the lack of these resources in the U.S. and the need within the city. The City of Saint Paul has the largest and fastest-growing population of Karen people in the U.S.

In 2019, the library eliminated fines for overdue items. This change was an outgrowth of the library's racial equity work; parts of the city where there were more people living in poverty and more people of color had higher percentages of cardholders with accounts blocked from nonpayment of fines.

== Services and programs ==
Read Brave Saint Paul is a reading program that uses books to ignite conversation about tough topics such as homelessness. Read Brave highlights YA novels that address difficult topics and is open to all ages.

== Directors ==
- Helen J. McCaine -1913
- William Dawson Johnston 1914-1921
- Jennie T. Jennings 1921-1922 and 1931-1936
- Webster Wheelock 1922-1931
- Perrie Jones 1937-1955
- J. Archer Eggen 1956-1978
- Gerald Steenberg 1979-1995
- Carole Williams 1995-2002
- Gina La Force 2002-2005
- Kathleen Flynn 2005-2006
- Melanie Huggins 2007-2009
- Kit Hadley 2009–2015
- Jane Eastwood 2015–2017
- Catherine Penkert 2018–2022
- Maureen Hartman 2023-
