= Ram =

Ram, ram, or RAM commonly refers to:

- Random-access memory, a form of computer data storage
  - RAM drive, RAM used to emulate secondary storage
- Rama, or Ram, one of the prominent deities in Hinduism and central character in the ancient epic Ramayana
- Ram, a male sheep
- Ram Trucks, US (founded 2009)
  - List of vehicles named Dodge Ram, trucks and vans
  - Ram Pickup, produced by Ram Trucks

Ram, ram, or RAM may also refer to:

== Animals ==
- Ram cichlid, a freshwater tropical fish

== People ==
- Ram (given name)
- Ram (surname)
- Ram (director), or Ramsubramaniam, an Indian Tamil film director
- RAM (DJ), a Dutch trance producer and DJ
- Ram Dass (Richard Alpert), an American spiritual teacher and author

== Religion ==
- Ram (biblical figure), a minor figure in the Hebrew Bible, and an ancestor of David
- Ram and Rud, the progenitors of the second generation of humans in Mandaeism

== Places ==
- Roum, Jezzine, a village in Lebanon
- Ram, Serbia, a settlement in the municipality of Veliko Gradište
- Ram Island (disambiguation), several islands with the name
- Ram Fortress, Serbia
- Ram Range, a mountain range in the Canadian Rockies
- Ram River, Alberta, Canada
- Lake Ram, Golan Heights, Syria
- Mizo Ram, a state in northeastern India

== Transportation ==
- Ramingining Airport, Australia (IATA code: RAM)
- Ramsgate railway station, England (National Rail code: RAM)

== Arts, media, and entertainment ==
- Ram (album), 1971, by Paul and Linda McCartney
- Ram & Tam, a late 1970s-early 1980s reggae duo
- RAM (band), Port-au-Prince, Haiti
- Ram (film), an upcoming Indian film
- Ram FM, a radio station, Derbyshire, England (1994–2010)
- RAM Records, UK
- Random Access Memories, a 2013 album by Daft Punk
- Rock Australia Magazine (1975–1989)
- RAM (Rapid Action Mission), a 2024 Indian film
- Ram, one of the titular characters of the 2018 Indian film W/O Ram (Wife Of Ram)
- Ram, a character portrayed by Ram Charan in the 2022 Indian film RRR, based on Indian independence activist Alluri Sitarama Raju
- "RAM" (Person of Interest), an episode of the American television series Person of Interest

== Organizations ==
=== Museums ===
- Rockbund Art Museum, Shanghai, China
- Royal Alberta Museum, Edmonton, Alberta, Canada

=== Other organizations ===
- Revolutionary Action Movement, a 1960s American socialist organization
- Reform the Armed Forces Movement, a Philippines military cabal in the 1980s–1990s
- Remote Area Medical Volunteer Corps, an American health care organization
- Renew America Movement, an American political group
- Residents Action Movement, a New Zealand political party
- Resistencia Ancestral Mapuche, an alleged separatist organization in Argentina and Chile
- Rise Above Movement, an American white nationalist organization
- Royal Academy of Music, London, England
- Royal Air Maroc, the national airline of Morocco

== Astrology ==
- Aries (astrology), an astrological sign, also known as the Ram
- Goat (zodiac), or Ram, a sign of the Chinese zodiac

== Science and technology ==
=== Computing ===
- Random-access machine, a theoretical computer model
- .ram, a file extension for the RealAudio file format

=== Military ===
- Ram (rocket), an American anti-tank weapon used during the Korean War
- A device used for ramming
- Ram tank, Canada, WWII
- RIM-116 Rolling Airframe Missile, a naval surface-to-air missile
- Naval ram, a weapon fitted to varied types of ships

=== Other uses in science and technology ===
- Extension ram, a hydraulic rescue tool
- Hydraulic ram
- Radar-absorbent material
- Rechargeable alkaline manganese battery
- Relative atomic mass
- Reliability, availability, and maintainability, in logistics
- Root apical meristem, a plant tissue

== Other uses ==
- Aries (constellation), also known as the Ram
- RAM Racing, an F1 team (1976–1985)
- Ram languages, Papua New Guinea
- Canela language (ISO 639-3 code: ram)

== See also ==
- Rama (disambiguation)
- Ramu (disambiguation)
- Rams (disambiguation)
