= Rams =

Rams or RAMS may refer to:

- Male sheep

== Places ==
- Rams (Ras Al Khaimah), a settlement in the United Arab Emirates

== People ==
- Dieter Rams, (born 1932), German industrial designer
- Joaquin Rams, (born 1972), American murderer and suspected serial killer.

== Arts, entertainment, and media ==
=== Films ===
- Rams (2015 film), a 2015 Icelandic drama by Grímur Hákonarson
- Rams (2018 film), a documentary about German industrial designer Dieter Rams
- Rams (2020 film), a 2020 Australian remake of the 2015 Icelandic film

=== Games ===
- Rams (card game), a European plain tricking card game related to Nap and Loo; also called Rounce

== Sports teams ==
- Adelaide Rams, a former Australian rugby league club
- AFC Croydon Athletic, an English association football club from London
- Cleveland Rams, a former American football team that relocated to Los Angeles in 1946
- Colorado State Rams, the athletic teams of Colorado State University, Fort Collins, Colorado, United States
- Bury Town F.C., an English association football club from Bury St Edmunds
- Derby County F.C., an English association football club
- Dewsbury Rams, an English rugby league team
- Fordham Rams, the athletic teams of Fordham University, New York City, New York, United States
- Framingham State University, Framingham, Massachusetts, United States, sports teams
- Greater Sydney Rams, an Australian rugby union team
- Los Angeles Rams, an American football team (NFL) that relocated to St. Louis in 1995 and returned to Los Angeles in 2016
- St. Louis Rams, a former American football team (NFL) that relocated to Los Angeles in 2016
- North Village Rams, a Bermudian association football team
- Nürnberg Rams, an American football team from Nuremberg, Germany
- Overbrook High School (New Jersey), home of the Rams sports teams
- Rawalpindi Rams, a Pakistani cricket team
- Rhode Island Rams, the sports teams of the University of Rhode Island in Kingston, Rhode Island, United States
- Shepherd University, Shepherdstown, West Virginia, United States sports teams
- St. John's College (Harare), Zimbabwe, sports teams
- TMU Bold, the athletic teams of Toronto Metropolitan University, known as the Ryerson Rams until 2022, Toronto, Ontario, Canada
- VCU Rams, the sports teams of Virginia Commonwealth University, Richmond, Virginia, United States

== Other uses ==
- RAMS Home Loans, an Australian mortgage broker, now a subsidiary of Westpac Bank
- Regional Atmospheric Modeling System, a collection of atmospheric simulation, data analysis, and visualization software
- Reliability, availability, maintainability and safety, complementary tools to determine if a system has been designed to satisfy a set of non-functional requirements
- Research Activity Management System, now the Learning Activity Management System, a free and open-source learning design system for designing, managing and delivering online collaborative learning activities
- Risk assessment models, risk assessment management system, or risk assessment and method statements, systematic approaches for identifying how to carry out a task in a safe manner
- Roseville Area Middle School, a Minnesota Middle School

== See also ==
- Ram (disambiguation)
- Ram's horn (disambiguation)
