= Ram (given name) =

Ram is a masculine given name. In South Asia it is a variant of Rama, and in Hebrew it means high or senior, a biblical name (Ram, son of Hezron), which is also sometimes used as a diminutive form of Avram (a variant of Abraham). Notable persons with the name include:

== People ==
- Ram Chandra Bharadwaj (died 1918), a defendant in the Hindu–German Conspiracy Trial
- Ram Chandra Paudel, Nepalese politician and Third President of Nepal
- Ram Baran Yadav, First President of Nepal
- Ram Chiang, Hong Kong actor and singer
- Ram Prasad Bismil (1897–1927), Indian revolutionary
- Ram Bahadur Bomjon (born c. 1990), Nepalese teenager televised meditating for days without moving
- Ram Charan (disambiguation)
- Ram Bahadur Thapa, Nepalese politician
- Guru Ram Das (1534–1581), fourth of the Ten Gurus of Sikhism
- Ram Etwareea, Mauritian politician
- Ram Gopal (disambiguation)
- Ram Herrera, Tejano musician
- Ram Kapoor (born 1973), Indian television actor
- Ram Karmi (1931–2013), Israeli architect
- Ram Dass Katari (1911–1983), Indian Navy vice-admiral and Chief of the Naval Staff
- Ram Kumar (artist) (1924–2018), Indian artist
- Ram Kumar (basketball) (born 1964), Indian basketball player
- Ram Krishna Kunwar, 18th century Nepalese military general
- Ram Loevy (1940–2025), Israeli television director and screenwriter
- Ram Madhav (born 1964), Indian politician, writer, journalist and National General Secretary of the Bharatiya Janata Party
- Ram Malla, also known as Kshetra, king of Mallabhum from 1185 to 1209
- Ram Narayan (1927–2024), Indian sarangi player
- Ram Pothineni (born 1988), Indian Tollywood film actor
- Ram Prasad (disambiguation)
- Ram Mohan Roy (1772–1833), Indian reformer
- Ram Shah (1606–1641), King of Gorkha, Nepal
- Ram Vilas Sharma (1912–2000), Indian literary critic, linguist, poet and thinker
- Ram Soffer (born 1965), Israeli chess Grandmaster
- Ram Singh (disambiguation)
- Ram Torten (born 1966), Israeli Olympic competitive sailor
- Ram Gopal Varma (born 1962), Indian Tollywood and Bollywood film director
- Ram Gopal Vijayvargiya (1905–2003), Indian painter
- Ramkumar, Indian actor
- Raam Mori (born 1993), Gujarati language short story writer from India
- Ram Puneet Tiwary (born 1979), a Singaporean Indian and alleged murderer of the 2003 Sydney double murders case

== Biblical and fictional characters ==
- Ram (Biblical figure)
- Ram (comics), a Japanese DC Comics superhero
- Ram, in the 1982 American science-fiction film Tron
- Ram, in the 1999-2003 New Zealand/British TV series The Tribe
- Ram, in the 2011 Japanese role-playing video game Hyperdimension Neptunia Mk2
- Ram (Re:Zero), in the light novel series Re:Zero − Starting Life in Another World
- Ram Singh, in the 2016 Doctor Who spinoff TV series Class
- Ram Sweeney, a character in the 1988 American black comedy film Heathers and its 2014 musical adaptation
