= Ramu (disambiguation) =

The Ramu is a major river in Papua New Guinea.

Ramu may also refer to:

- Ramu languages, a language family
- Ramu (1966 film), an Indian Tamil-language film
- Ramu (1968 film), an Indian Telugu-language film
- Ramu (1987 film), an Indian Telugu-language film
- RAMU (album), by drummer Mickey Hart
- Ramu Upazila, a upazila (subdivision) in Bangladesh
- Ramu (monkey), kept behind bars in India for 5 years on the charge of disturbing communal harmony
- Ramu, nickname of the elephant Thechikottukavu Ramachandran of Peramangalam village in Kerala, India
- Rabbi Mordechai Willig, whose Hebrew acronym (רמ"ו) is transliterated into English as Ramu

== People with the given name ==
Ramu is a hypocorism for Ram (given name) in India.

- Ramu (actor), Indian film actor in Malayalam films
- Ramu (film producer), Indian film producer in Kannada films
- Ramu Tokashiki (born 1991), Japanese women's basketball player
- Ramu Annadavascan, Singaporean convicted killer

== See also ==
- Rama (disambiguation)
- Ram (disambiguation)
