= Pillette Road Truck Assembly =

Pillette Road Truck Assembly Plant
- Built: 1974
- Location: Windsor, Ontario, Canada
- Coordinates: 42.3°N 82.963°W
- Industry: Automotive
- Products: Dodge Ram Van, Dodge Ram Wagon
- Area: 750,000 sq ft (70,000 m^{2})
- Address: Pillette Road
- Defunct: 2003 (demolished 2004)

Pillette Road Truck Assembly Plant was a Chrysler automobile factory in Windsor, Ontario, Canada. The plant built the Dodge Ram Van and Dodge Ram Wagon from its opening in 1974 to its closing in 2003. Total lifetime production was 2,309,399 units with a peak production of 124,124 in 1984.

== Products ==
- 1974-2003 Dodge Ram Van / Dodge Ram Wagon

== Closing ==
As the full-size van market declined and DaimlerChrysler's share of the market shrunk, DaimlerChrysler discontinued the Ram Van and Wagon in 2003 and replaced them with the Dodge Sprinter, a rebadged version of the Mercedes-Benz Sprinter that was manufactured in Germany and imported into the US. Unable to secure a replacement product, the plant closed in July 2003 despite a recently constructed paint shop building. The original assembly plant and adjacent paint shop building were subsequently demolished.

== See also ==
- List of Chrysler factories
