= Tony Tan (disambiguation) =

Tony Tan (Tony Tan Keng Yam, born 1940) is a Singaporean politician, the seventh President of Singapore.

Tony Tan may also refer to:

- Tony Tan Caktiong, Filipino entrepreneur, founder of Jollibee
- Tony Tan Lay Thiam, opposition politician in Singapore
- Tony Tan Poh Chuan, Singaporean murder victim in an unsolved double murder case that occurred in Sydney
