= Reservoir Woods Park =

Park in Roseville, Minnesota, United States

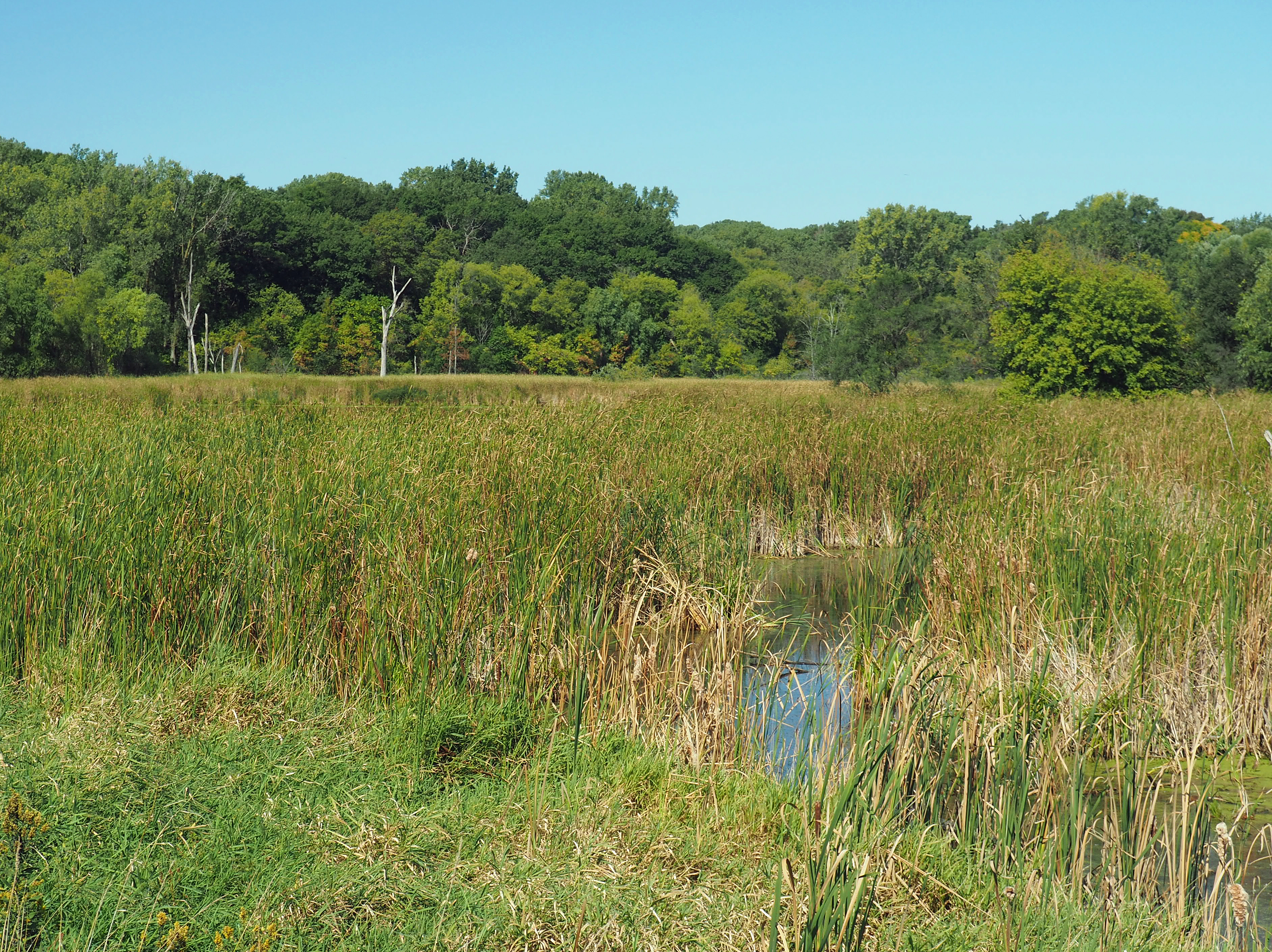
- Marsh and forest at Reservoir Woods Park
- Interactive map of Reservoir Woods Park
- Location: Roseville, Minnesota, United States
- Coordinates: 44°59′50″N 93°7′26″W
- Area: 115 acres (47 ha)
- Created: 1997
- Operator: Roseville Parks and Recreation
- Designation: Regional park

Reservoir Woods Park is a public park in Roseville, Minnesota, United States. The largely undeveloped 115-acre (47 ha) property contains some of the highest ground in the city and two dog parks.

The site of the park contains a 30 million-gallon aboveground reservoir that was built and operated by the City of Saint Paul. The land was sold to the City of Roseville in 1997, after the old 90 million-gallon reservoir built in 1918 became outdated and was taken out of service.

When Roseville created Reservoir Woods Park, the land was intentionally left in a very forest-like state. Very little development has been done other than building a paved trail through the park and maintaining various natural-surface trails. The park's paved trail connects to the McCarrons Lake paths and Trout Brook Regional Trail to the east, sidepaths along Roselawn Avenue and Lexington Avenue to the west, a sidepath along Dale Street to the north, and the parking area off Larpenteur Avenue to the south.
