= Parkview Center School =

Location
- Roseville, Minnesota; USA; 45°0′29″N 93°7′48″W

Information
- Type: Public
- Established: 1989
- Principal: Nathaniel Gibbs
- Enrollment: 750
- Colors: Black & Silver
- Mascot: Jaguar
- Nickname: Parkview or PCS
- Information: 651-487-4360, Press 7
- Website: https://parkviewcenter.isd623.org/

Parkview Center School (Parkview or PCS) is a public K-8 School located in Roseville, Minnesota. Parkview Center School is the only district-wide, kindergarten through eighth grade school in Roseville Area Schools District 623. Families living in the district, as well as in surrounding communities, choose to enroll their children at Parkview where innovation, high achievement and global education." are at the heart of the school. This K-8 public school was established in 1989. The building is also home to the school district's Early Childhood Family Education Center, which serves children from birth to five years old.

Parkview Center School has procedures designed to allow equitable access for enrolling at PCS. An annual enrollment application timeline, followed by a lottery drawing every February, governs access to the School. The district neighborhood elementary schools draw their students from a specific district attendance area.

The school's choice program attracts students from throughout the Roseville School District which serves Falcon Heights, Lauderdale, Little Canada, Maplewood, and Shoreview, Minnesota, as well as from St. Paul and neighboring suburbs.

== History ==
Parkview started in the fall of 1989 when a group of Roseville Area School district educators created an alternative or "choice" elementary school for grades kindergarten through four. Grade five was added a year later, followed by grade six the year after that. Grades 7 and 8 were added in 1994 and 1995, respectively. The school is housed in the former Parkview Middle School built in 1967.

Unlike the neighborhood elementary schools and middle school in the district, Parkview offered "flexible, multi-aged groupings of students in each classroom and used a thematic approach to learning that emphasized global education and community involvement." Parkview teachers incorporated whole language with traditional learning approaches. Classrooms were structured along multi-age groupings, pairing first and second grade students, third and fourth, etc. Only Kindergarten and grades seven and eight were not paired.

The school was the only school in the district, until 2012, to offer a K-6 foreign language program, settling on Spanish in 1995. In 2015 the Spanish program for grades K-6 was dropped and an E-STEM program was added.

Parent involvement was encouraged at this alternative school. In addition to the traditional parent volunteer roles parents could participate in, such as, classroom volunteer, room parent, field trip chaperone, etc., parents could also be on the AESOP Committee (today's PEACE Program) or Parkview Advisory Committee (today’s Site Council). Parkview continues to be the only school in the district with a parent advisory committee - the PCS Site Council.

Parkview Center School currently enrolls 750 students in grades K-8.

== Academics ==
Parkview Center School offers an inclusive educational program with 30 regular classrooms and additional facilities provided for Instrumental/Vocal music; Art; an E-STEM program; a grade 7-8 Spanish language program; Child Study Team Services; Speech/Language; and Special Education. The Special Education program offers a full continuum of services for children with disabilities including IShine and Home Base programs. Chorus, band and orchestra programs are available for students in grades four through eight.

An example of the interage connections students make is the Parkview tile mural project. After a year-long initiative, involving students from Pre-K to grade 8, the permanent PEACE (Peace, Equity, Action, Community and Environment) mosaic mural near the cafeteria and the main entrance to the building was unveiled at a school-wide assembly on May 26, 2011. The project was funded with a grant that allowed local artists and a local tile company to work with students across the age spectrum for a month.

=== P.E.A.C.E. Program ===
The P.E.A.C.E. Program (originally called AESOP) began in 1989 as a collaboration between parents, community members, and teachers offering special classes taught by parents and others from the community providing a world community focus to the entire Parkview program. AESOP stood for Academic Enrichment Special Options Program. Reorganized in the fall of 2002, A.E.S.O.P. incorporated cultural studies (Affirming Diversity), environmental education including the School Forest (Environmental Stewardship), service learning opportunities (Service to our Community and Ownership as Responsible Citizens), and the Peace Program (Peace in our World).

On October 1, 2010, the AESOP Program became the P.E.A.C.E. Program. Five weeks throughout the school year are chosen to focus on a letter in PEACE (Peace, Equity, Action, Community, Environment). Each grade level develops specific activities they will complete during these weeks.

- Peace --- Promoting peace in our world
- Equity --- Equitable acceptance
- Action --- Acting with responsibility to others, ourselves, and places
- Community --- Community building through service learning
- Environment --- Encouraging earth friendly endeavors

Parkview Center School was dedicated as an International Peace Site in 1995 and displays their Peace Pole next to the building's entrance.

=== Recipient of the National Blue Ribbon School Award-Category: High Performing - 2010 ===
"The US Department of Education Blue Ribbon Schools Program honors public and private elementary, middle, and high schools that are either high performing or have improved student achievement to high levels, especially among disadvantaged students. The program is part of a larger Department of Education effort to identify and disseminate knowledge about best school leadership and teaching practices. Each year since 1982, the U.S. Department of Education has sought out schools where students attain and maintain high academic goals, including those that beat the odds."

Parkview Center School was honored as a "School whose students, regardless of backgrounds, are high performing. These are schools ranked among the state's highest performing schools as measured by their performance on state assessments." "The Blue Ribbon Schools Program sets a standard of excellence for all schools striving for the highest level of achievement. Each year since 1982, the U.S. Department of Education has sought out schools where students attain and maintain high academic goals . . . To be named a Blue Ribbon School is to join an elite group. Of more than 138,000 in the United States, just over 6,000 of America's schools have received this honor over the past 28 years."

=== Environmental Program and an Emmy Award ===
Parkview began participating, during the 2008-2009 school year, in Ramsey County's and Washington County's Food-to-Hogs Program under the direction of Dan Schoepke, Senior Environmental Specialist with the Washington County Department of Public Health and Environment and supported by MEHA (Minnesota Environmental Health Association). The school also started looking at other ways to reduce, reuse, and recycle.

==== Emmy Award ====
In 2011 Parkview Center School and their partners won a 2011 Upper Midwest Regional Emmy Award. The video is a guide to school recycling initiated and funded by Saint Paul - Ramsey County Public Health, produced by the City of Roseville, filmed and edited by CTV North Suburbs, and starring students and staff at Roseville's Parkview Center School. "Boxes, Bottles and Banana Peels: A Guide To School Recycling," won first place in the "Education/Schools - Program/Special/Series" category of the Regional Emmy Award competition of The Upper Midwest Chapter of the Academy of Television Arts and Sciences. The video offers a step-by-step guide for schools considering establishing or improving a program for recycling paper, bottles cans and food leftovers.

=== Urban School Forest ===
Parkview has a school forest, an official designation bestowed by the Minnesota Department of Natural Resources in 1993. The school forest is an outdoor classroom where students learn and apply math, art, science, language arts, and geography while gaining an appreciation and awareness of natural resources. School forests promote peace through use of environmental action in schools and community with participation from the Department of Natural Resources; the local Forestry office; local community leaders and members; and parents. Parkview is part of a network of just 120 school forests, out of Minnesota's 2,006 public schools, located around the state.

Trees planted by students in 1993, led by an active team of parents, teachers, and natural resource professionals, literally transformed the landscape around the school. School Forest projects continue to include planting and landscaping projects on the school grounds. Periodically these projects are featured on the Minnesota Department of Natural Resources web site, the latest in 2012.

=== Web Presence ===
Parkview Center School was one of the first schools in Roseville Area Schools District 623 to have a website thanks to the efforts of three parent volunteers, the University of Minnesota School of Forestry (now part of the College of Natural Resources), and the staff of the University of Minnesota Remote Sensing Lab. The page was first posted during the spring of 1995. On October 1, 1996, the pages were moved to the Roseville Area Schools website.

Parent volunteers Pam Jakes, Jerrilyn Thompson, and Dorothy Anderson envisioned a School Forest program at Parkview and part of that vision included putting the school on the web in 1994, hosted by the Department of Forest Resources, GIS and Remote Sensing Laboratory and webmaster Steve Lime. The Parkview website moved during the summer of 1996 to the Roseville Area Schools district website.
