= Bennett Lake (Minnesota) =

Lake in the state of Minnesota, United States

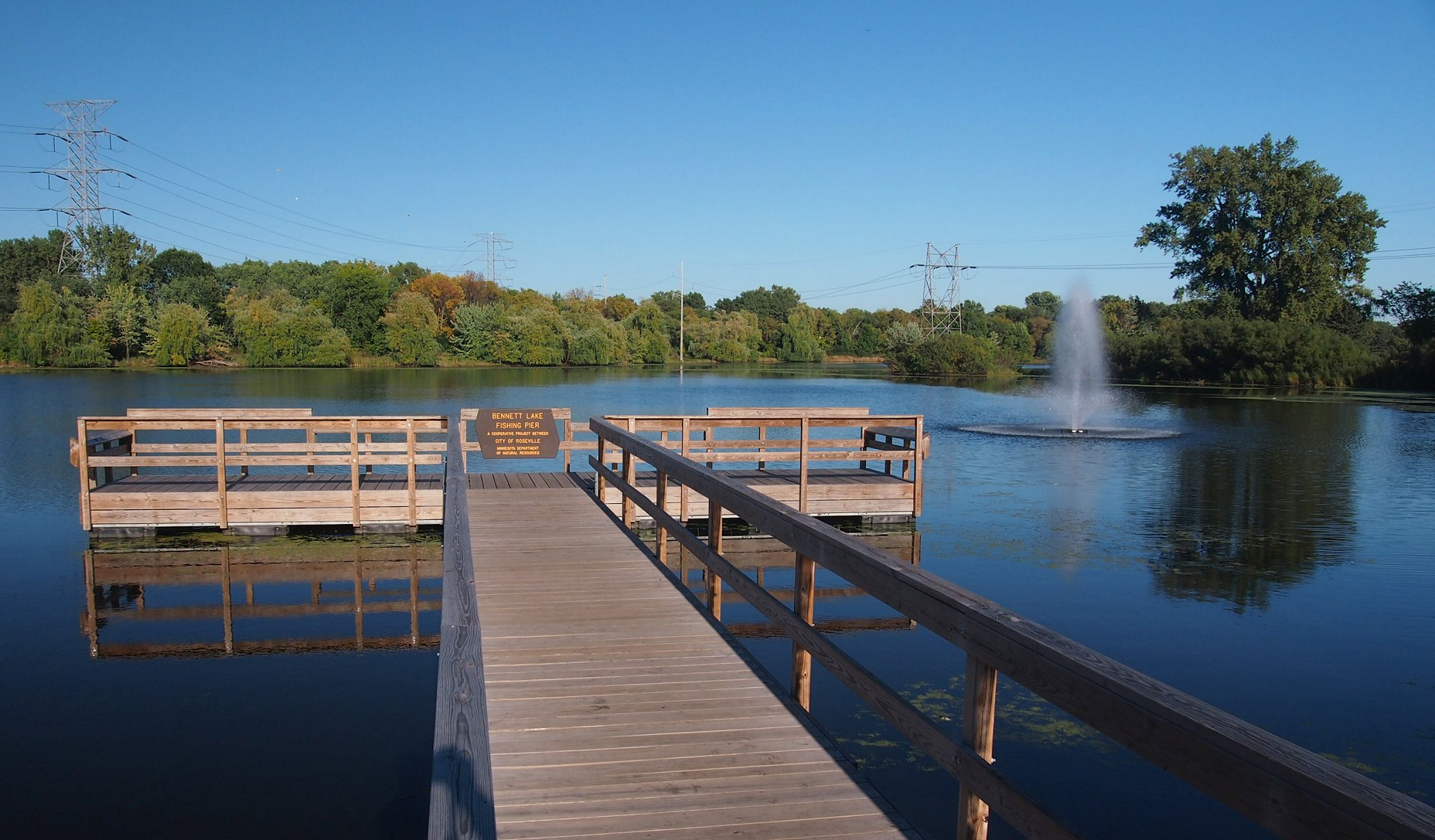
- Bennett Lake's fishing pier and fountain

- Location within Minnesota
- Location: Roseville, Ramsey County, Minnesota
- Coordinates: 45°1′5″N 93°8′30″W
- Basin countries: United States
- Surface area: 29.04 acres (11.75 ha)
- Max. depth: 9 feet (2.7 m)
- Shore length^{1}: 1.01 miles (1.63 km)
- References: https://www.dnr.state.mn.us/lakefind/lake.html?id=62004800
- ^{1} Shore length is not a well-defined measure.

Bennett Lake is a lake located in Roseville, Minnesota, a suburb of the Twin Cities. It occupies 28 acres (11 ha) acres and is known for its shore fishing. The lake is adjacent to Roseville Central Park, the city's largest park.

A 2005 shore restoration project led to improved water quality, and the nearby Prince of Peace Lutheran Church has constructed rain gardens to restrict the flow of surface runoff into the lake.

The lake is home to several species of fish, including black bullhead, black crappie, bluegill, green sunfish, hybrid sunfish, largemouth bass, northern pike, and pumpkinseed.
