= Robert Bell (Minnesota politician) =

American politician

Bob Bell

Member of the Minnesota House of Representatives
- In office 1967–1974

Personal details
- Born: Robert Charles Bell; August 16, 1926 Saint Paul, Minnesota
- Died: February 10, 2014 (aged 87)
- Party: Republican
- Education: University of Minnesota (LLB)

Military service
- Branch/service: United States Army
- Battles/wars: World War II

Robert Charles "Bob" Bell (August 16, 1926 – February 10, 2014) was an American politician and attorney.

== Background ==
Born in Saint Paul, Minnesota, Bell served in the United States Army during World War II. He graduated from University of Minnesota Law School in 1950. Bell was a state representative from 1966-74 for Roseville area. He practiced law and served as the Roseville City Attorney for 36 years. He served as special assistant Ramsey County attorney for Long Lake Regional Park acquisition. He was a Ramsey County Charter commission member from 2000-08. He was a Rotary club Paul Harris Fellow.

He was a member of the Republican Party. Bell served in the Minnesota House of Representatives from 1967 to 1974.
