= Roseville, Minnesota =

City in Minnesota, United States

- City
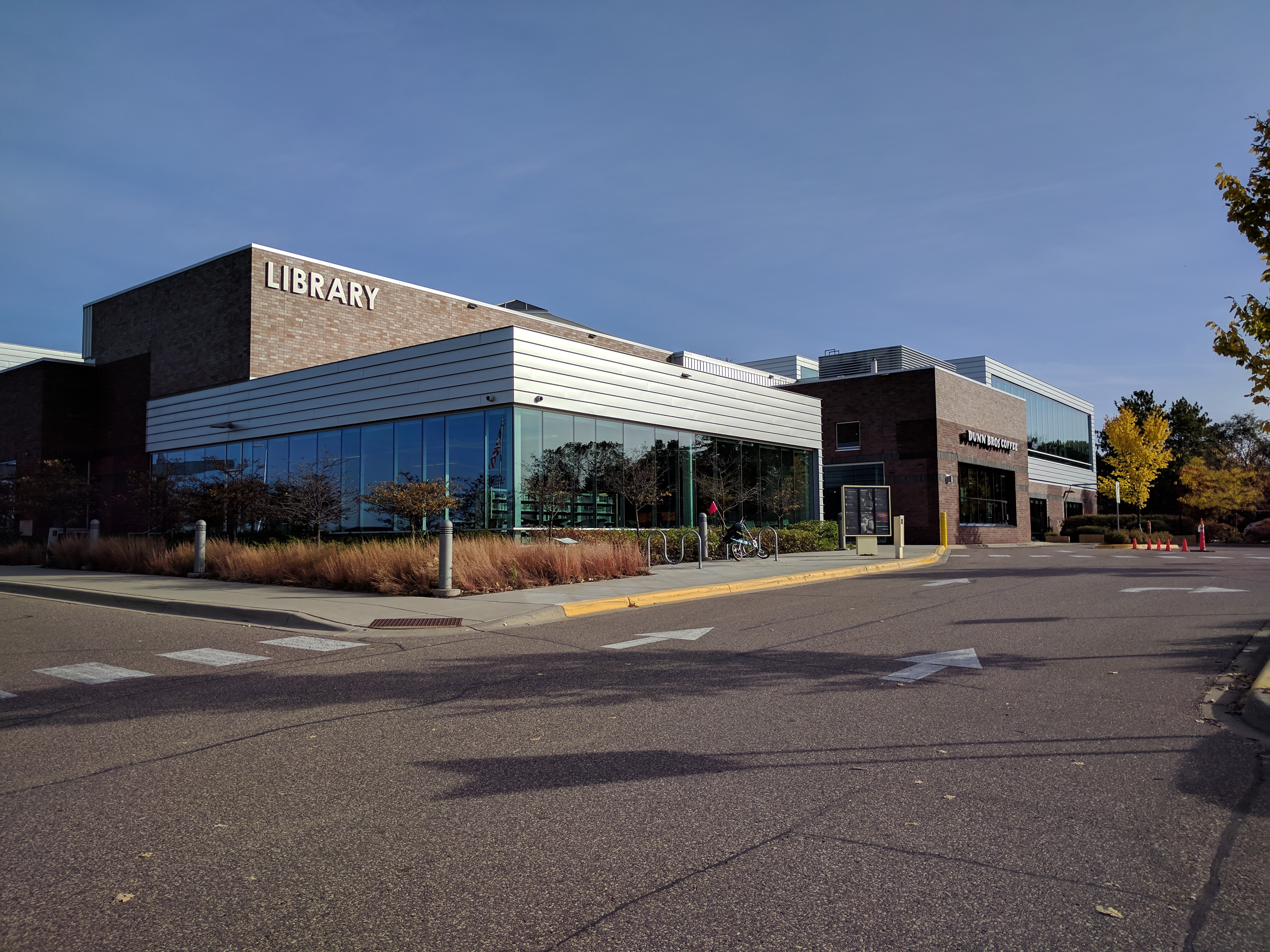
- Roseville Public Library

- Logo

- Location of the city of Roseville within Ramsey County, Minnesota
- Coordinates: 45°0′55″N 93°9′11″W
- Country: United States
- State: Minnesota
- County: Ramsey
- Incorporated: 1948

Area
  - Total: 13.85 sq mi (35.86 km^{2})
  - Land: 13.02 sq mi (33.72 km^{2})
  - Water: 0.83 sq mi (2.14 km^{2})
- Elevation: 912 ft (278 m)

Population (2020)
  - Total: 36,254
  - Estimate (2022): 35,627
  - Density: 2,784.5/sq mi (1,075.11/km^{2})
  - Demonym: Rosevillian
- Time zone: UTC-6 (Central)
  - Summer (DST): UTC-5 (CDT)
- ZIP codes: 55112, 55113
- Area code: 651
- FIPS code: 27-55852
- GNIS feature ID: 2396435
- Website: ci.roseville.mn.us

Roseville is a city in Ramsey County, Minnesota, United States. It is one of two Twin Cities suburbs that border both Saint Paul and Minneapolis (Lauderdale is the other). The population was 36,254 at the 2020 census.

== History ==
Roseville's land was originally settled by the Dakota and Ojibwe peoples. The first white settlers came in 1843, and Native Americans left the area by 1862. Rose Township was established in 1858; it was named after one of the first settlers, Isaac Rose. The township included the areas now known as Roseville, Lauderdale, and Falcon Heights, as well as parts of present-day Saint Paul and Minneapolis. When it was first organized, Rose Township's western boundary was what is now Stinson Boulevard in Minneapolis, and its southern boundary was what is now Marshall Avenue until Dale Street, where it turned north until University Avenue (then called Minnehaha Avenue), where it turned east until it met Rice Street. Saint Paul's continued expansion and county boundary adjustments with Hennepin County reduced its size over time.

In the 1870s and 1880s, before Saint Paul reached its current size, there was a small settlement labeled on maps as Roseville. It was next to a farmstead owned by Jacob F. True, president of the Ramsey County Agricultural Society. Four large blocks were laid out in the shape of a parallelogram from the northwest corner of Saint Anthony Avenue and Snelling Avenue. Two roads ran through it, College Street (now Pierce Street) and Fry Street, and its northern road was essentially Shields Avenue. Its platting affected future developments, causing streets to be laid at an irregular distance from surrounding neighborhoods all the way down to Summit Avenue, between Pierce Street (then Webb Street where it met Summit) and Snelling Avenue, which can still be seen today.

The area saw rapid growth through the 1930s and 1940s, and Roseville incorporated as a village in 1948 to accommodate it. Falcon Heights and Lauderdale soon followed suit, and Rose Township ceased to exist. The first Roseville police chief was Ray Goneau, who held that position until 1977.

== Geography ==
According to the United States Census Bureau, the city has an area of 13.84 square miles (35.85 km^{2}), of which 13.00 square miles (33.67 km^{2}) is land and 0.84 square miles (2.18 km^{2}) is water.

The 45th parallel crosses the city; a marker at the northeast corner of the intersection of Cleveland Avenue and Loren Road identifies the location.

Interstate Highway 35W and Minnesota Highways 36, 51 (Snelling Avenue), and 280 are the four main routes in Roseville.

== Demographics ==
Historical population
Census	Pop.	Note	%±
1950	6,437		—
1960	23,997		272.8%
1970	34,438		43.5%
1980	35,820		4.0%
1990	33,485		−6.5%
2000	33,690		0.6%
2010	33,660		−0.1%
2020	36,254		7.7%
2022 (est.)	35,627		−1.7%
U.S. Decennial Census; 2020 Census

=== 2020 census ===
As of the 2020 census, Roseville had a population of 36,254. The median age was 40.6 years. 18.7% of residents were under the age of 18 and 22.4% of residents were 65 years of age or older. For every 100 females there were 90.9 males, and for every 100 females age 18 and over there were 88.3 males age 18 and over.

100.0% of residents lived in urban areas.

There were 15,554 households in Roseville, of which 23.1% had children under the age of 18 living in them. Of all households, 44.9% were married-couple households, 18.5% were households with a male householder and no spouse or partner present, and 30.3% were households with a female householder and no spouse or partner present. About 35.0% of all households were made up of individuals and 17.0% had someone living alone who was 65 years of age or older.

There were 16,103 housing units, of which 3.4% were vacant. The homeowner vacancy rate was 0.7% and the rental vacancy rate was 3.2%.

Racial composition as of the 2020 census
Race	Number	Percentage
White	26,192	72.2%
Black or African American	3,212	8.9%
American Indian and Alaska Native	210	0.6%
Asian	3,450	9.5%
Native Hawaiian and Other Pacific Islander	24	0.1%
Some other race	865	2.4%
Two or more races	2,301	6.3%
Hispanic or Latino (of any race)	1,942	5.4%

=== 2010 census ===
As of the census of 2010, there were 33,660 people, 14,623 households, and 8,406 families living in the city. The population density was 2,589.2 inhabitants per square mile (999.7/km^{2}). There were 15,490 housing units at an average density of 1,191.5 per square mile (460.0/km^{2}). The racial makeup of the city was 81.3% White, 6.2% African American, 0.5% Native American, 7.3% Asian American, 2.0% from other races, and 2.7% from two or more races. Hispanic or Latino of any race were 4.6% of the population.

There were 14,623 households, of which 23.2% had children under the age of 18 living with them, 46.0% were married couples living together, 8.4% had a female householder with no husband present, 3.1% had a male householder with no wife present, and 42.5% were non-families. 35.3% of all households were made up of individuals, and 15.4% had someone living alone who was 65 years of age or older. The average household size was 2.20 and the average family size was 2.87.

The median age in the city was 42.1 years. 18.6% of residents were under the age of 18; 10.8% were between the ages of 18 and 24; 23.7% were from 25 to 44; 26.6% were from 45 to 64; and 20.2% were 65 years of age or older. The gender makeup of the city was 47.1% male and 52.9% female.

=== 2000 census ===
As of the census of 2000, there were 33,690 people, 14,598 households, and 8,598 families living in the city. The population density was 2,543.9 inhabitants per square mile (982.2/km^{2}). There were 14,917 housing units at an average density of 1,126.4 per square mile (434.9/km^{2}). The racial makeup of the city was 89.49% White, 2.80% Black, 0.32% Native American, 4.89% Asian, 0.08% Pacific Islander, 0.76% from other races, and 1.65% from two or more races. Hispanic or Latino of any race were 1.97% of the population.

There were 14,598 households, out of which 22.2% had children under the age of 18 living with them, 49.2% were married couples living together, 7.2% had a female householder with no husband present, and 41.1% were non-families. 33.6% of all households were made up of individuals, and 13.9% had someone living alone who was 65 years of age or older. The average household size was 2.20 and the average family size was 2.82.

18.2% of residents were under the age of 18, 11.1% were between 18 and 24, 26.8% were between 25 and 44, 23.6% were between 45 and 64, and 20.3% were 65 years of age or older. The median age was 41 years. For every 100 females, there were 87.0 males. For every 100 females age 18 and over, there were 84.1 males.

The median income for a household in the city was $51,056, and the median income for a family was $65,861. (These figures had risen to $51,617 and $81,300, respectively, as of 2008.) Males had a median income of $41,765, and females had a median income of $32,389. The per capita income for the city was $27,755. About 2.6% of families and 4.2% of the population were below the poverty line, including 4.5% of those under age 18 and 2.9% of those age 65 or over.

=== Politics ===
United States presidential election results for Roseville, Minnesota
Year	Republican		Democratic		Third party(ies)	
Year	No.	%	No.	%	No.	%
2000	8,918	43.62%	10,201	49.90%	1,325	6.48%
2004	9,280	43.44%	11,808	55.28%	273	1.28%
2008	8,306	39.02%	12,576	59.08%	403	1.89%
2012	8,003	37.49%	12,843	60.16%	501	2.35%
2016	6,038	28.84%	12,872	61.48%	2,027	9.68%
2020	6,252	27.40%	16,029	70.25%	536	2.35%
2024	5,788	26.51%	15,467	70.84%	580	2.66%

Roseville is represented by Betty McCollum as part of Minnesota's 4th congressional district.

In the Minnesota Legislature, David Gottfried (District 40B) and John Marty (District 40) represent most of Roseville. Leigh Finke (District 66A) and Clare Oumou Verbeten (District 66) represent southwest Roseville. All are members of the Minnesota Democratic–Farmer–Labor Party.

== Economy ==
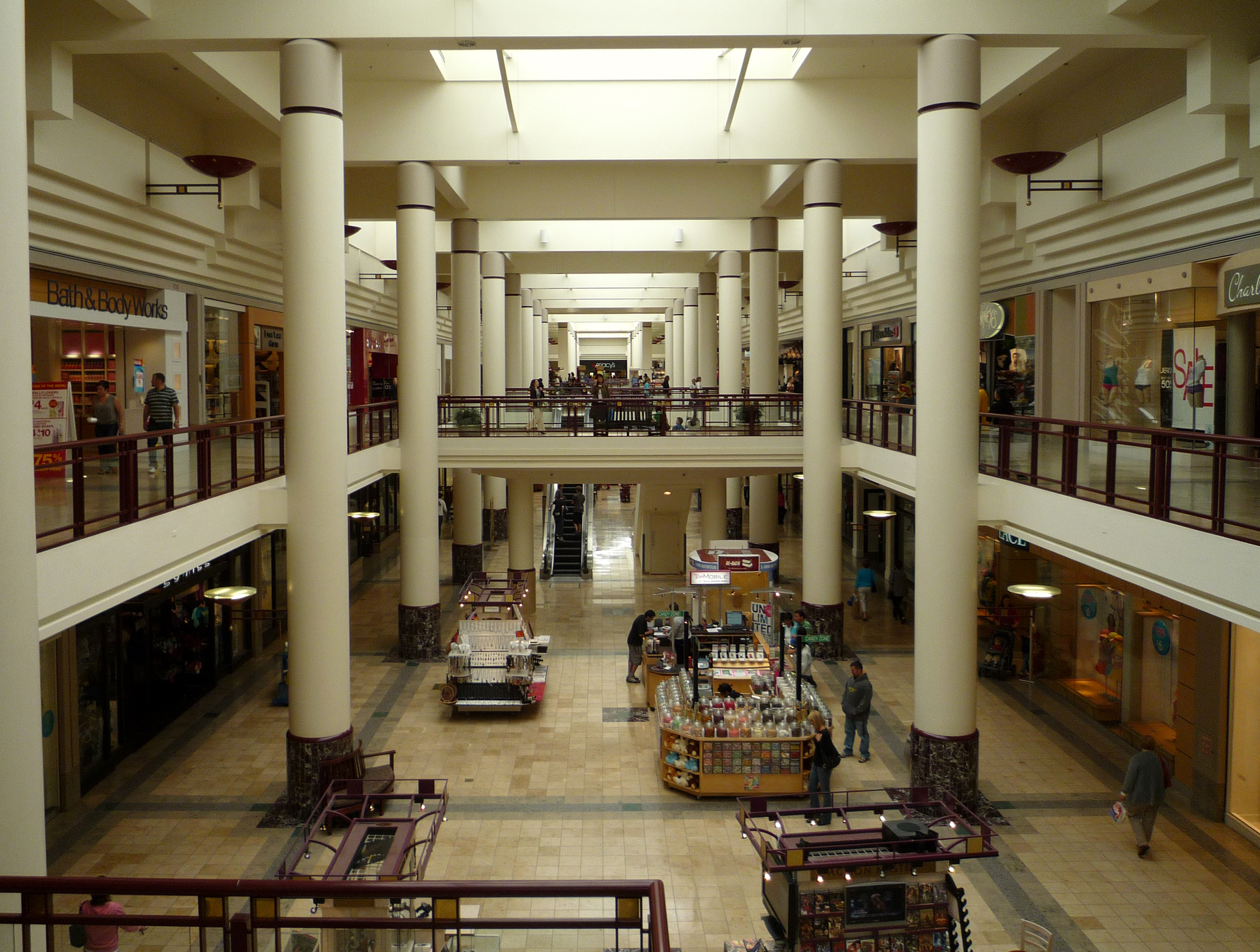
Rosedale Center, built in 1969, is a major regional shopping mall.

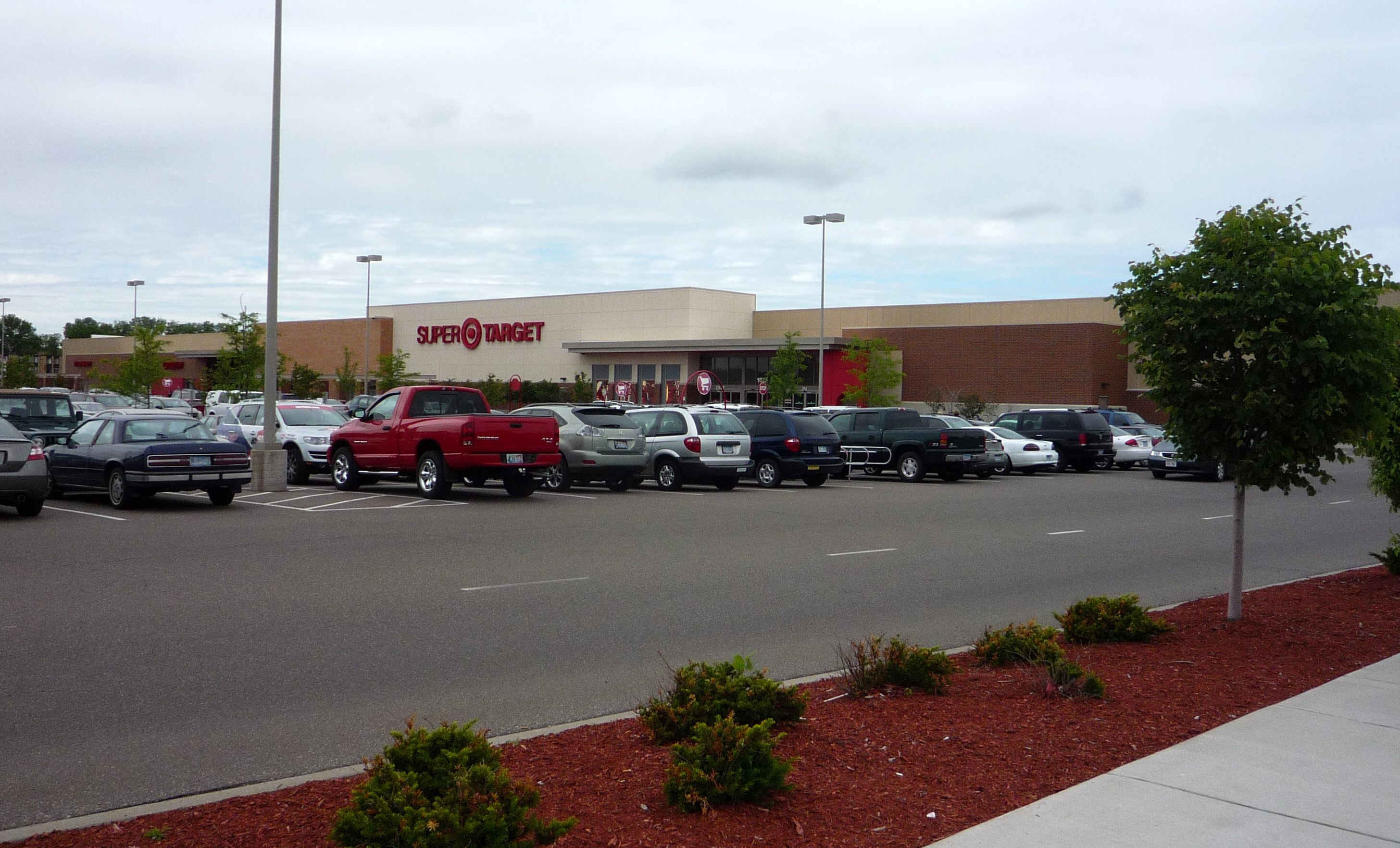
Site of the first Target store, opened in 1962 and torn down and replaced by this SuperTarget in 2005

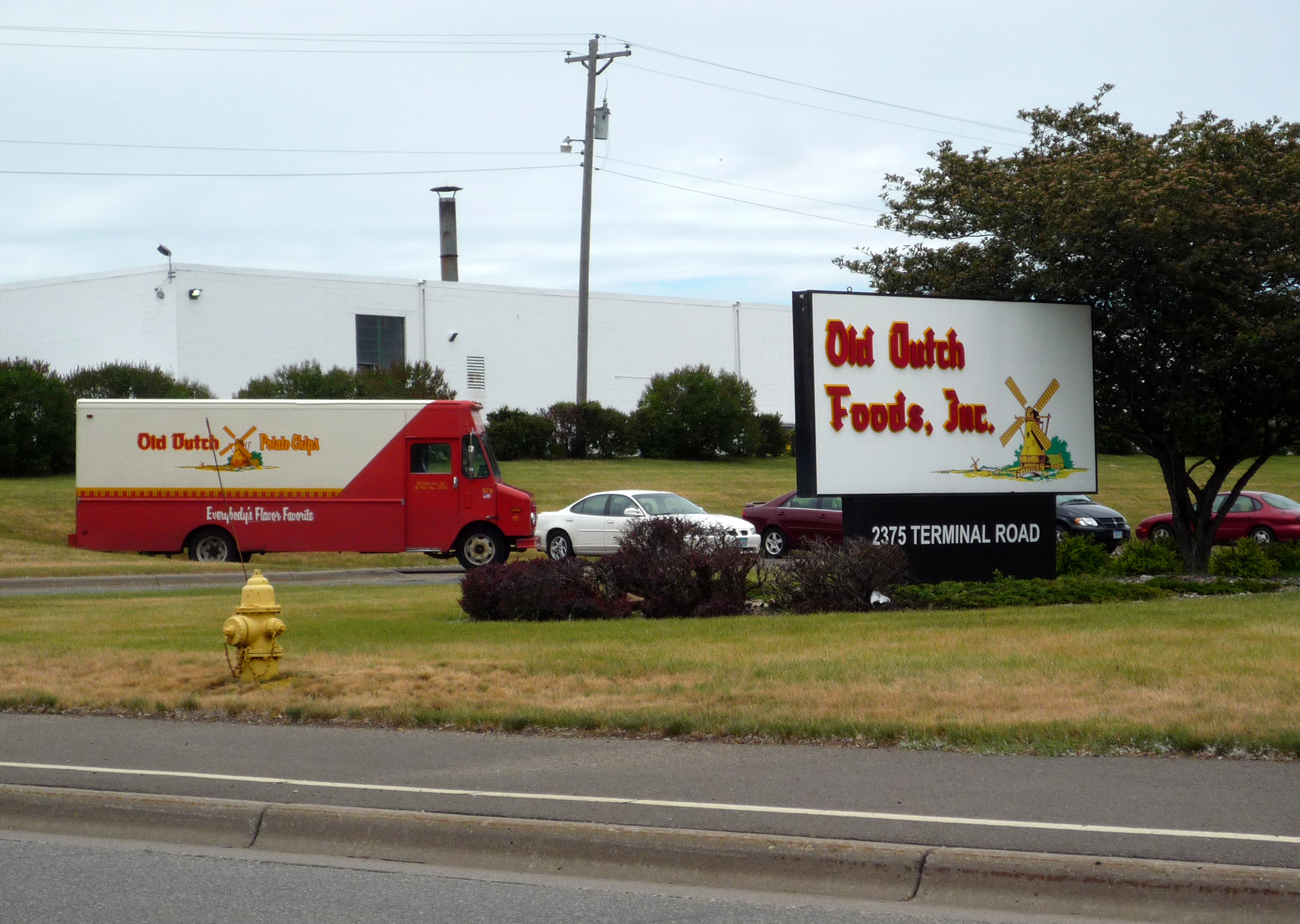
Headquarters of Old Dutch Foods in Roseville

Several major shopping centers are in Roseville, including Rosedale Center and the Har Mar Mall. The city's per-capita retail spending is slightly higher than that of Bloomington (home of the Mall of America), and it has the greatest number of restaurants per capita in the area.

The first Target store was built on May 3, 1962, in Roseville and replaced in 2005 by a SuperTarget. Roseville was home to the first Barnes & Noble bookstore outside New York City. This location was closed in 2005; Roseville's current Barnes & Noble in Roseville is the chain's second store there. Minnesota's first McDonald's was built in Roseville in 1957. The Roseville Dairy Queen, also the state's first, is on the Preservation Alliance of Minnesota's list of the 10 Most Endangered Historic Places.

One of the credit scoring and data analytics firm FICO's main Midwest U.S. office locations is in Roseville.

The Minnesota Department of Education has its headquarters in Roseville, as does the Minnesota Department of Transportation-Metropolitan District.

The fifth-largest board game publisher in the world, Fantasy Flight Games, is based in Roseville. Roseville Visitors Association, the Official Visitors Site for Roseville, Old Dutch Foods, Pediatric Home Service, the Minnesota Department of Education, and the Minnesota State Lottery are headquartered in Roseville.

From 1961 to 2017, UNIVAC designed and manufactured mainframe computers at a plant in Roseville.

== Arts and culture ==
Roseville Library (at Hamline Avenue and County Road B) is Minnesota's busiest library. It is the largest location in the Ramsey County Library system, with over 340,000 volumes in its collection, nearly three times that of any other branch in the county public library system. It was rebuilt in 1993, then torn down and rebuilt again with larger capacity in 2010. Only the downtown Saint Paul library, with around 400,000 volumes, has more materials.

== Sports ==
Roseville is also home to the John Rose Oval, North America's largest outdoor artificial sheet of ice. The 1995 Men's Bandy World Championship, 2006 Women's Bandy World Championship and the 2016 Women's Bandy World Championship were played there. The United States national bandy team and its Canadian counterpart usually play friendly games there against each other in November.

== Parks and recreation ==
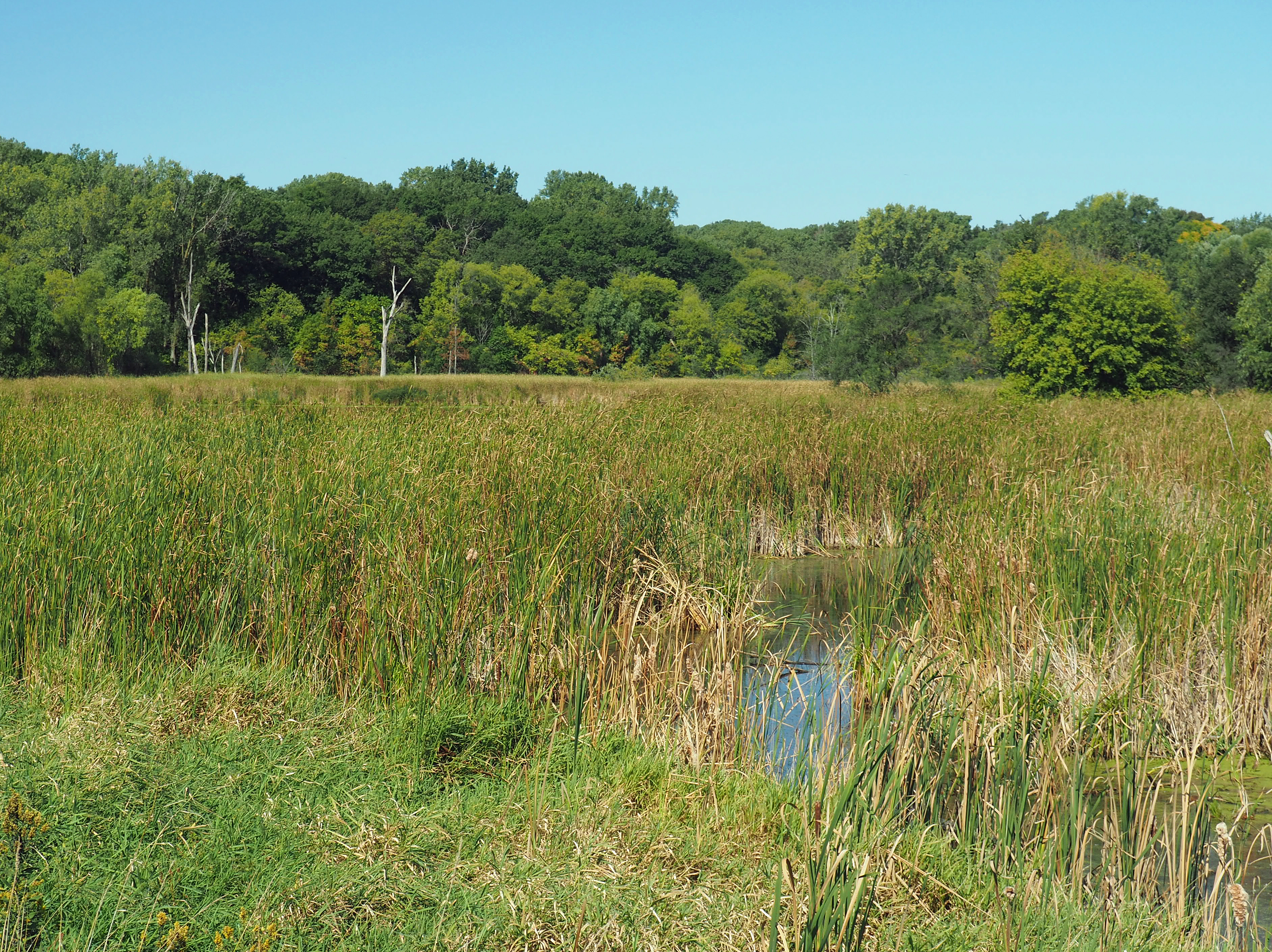
Reservoir Woods Park

Notable parks and recreation areas include Reservoir Woods Park, Guidant John Rose Minnesota Oval, and Bennett Lake in Central Park. At 225 acres, Central Park is Roseville's largest park, and one of the larger urban parks in Ramsey County.

== Education ==
=== Primary and secondary ===
Roseville is served by the Roseville Area Schools District (ISD 623).

Roseville elementary schools include Brimhall Elementary, Central Park Elementary, Emmett D. Williams Elementary, Edgerton Elementary, Falcon Heights Elementary, Little Canada Elementary, and Parkview Center School (K–8).

Roseville Area Middle School (RAMS) serves grades 7 and 8. Roseville Area High School (RAHS) serves grades 9 through 12. Richard Dean Anderson and Loni Anderson both graduated from Alexander Ramsey High School, which, along with Kellogg High School, became RAHS. Fairview Alternative High School is also located in the area.

Roseville is home to two Lutheran schools: Concordia Academy, a high school, and King of Kings Lutheran Church and School, a preschool-8th grade institution. Both are affiliated with the Lutheran Church–Missouri Synod.

St. Rose of Lima is a private (pre–K through 8) Catholic school.

=== Higher education ===
- University of Northwestern – Saint Paul

== Notable people ==
- Joey Anderson, NHL player
- Loni Anderson, actor, WKRP in Cincinnati
- Richard Dean Anderson, actor, MacGyver and Stargate SG-1
- Robert Bell, Minnesota state legislator
- David Frederickson, commissioner of the Minnesota Department of Agriculture
- Billy Graham, president of University of Northwestern – Saint Paul (1948–1952), founder radio station KTIS (AM) (1949)
- Mindy Greiling, Minnesota state legislator and author
- Jim Kramer, 2006 North American Scrabble champion
- Peter Krause, actor, Sports Night, Six Feet Under, Dirty Sexy Money, Parenthood and 9-1-1
- John Marty, Minnesota state senator
- Mike Muscala, NBA player
- Betsy Rue, former actress and model
- Lee Stecklein, PWHL and Olympic ice hockey player
