= Pediatric Home Service =

Pediatric Home Service (PHS) is an independent home health care provider. PHS provides in-home care to medically-complex children in Minnesota and is certified by The Joint Commission. PHS offers in-home pediatric health care services.

== Services ==
Respiratory therapy offered by PHS includes pulmonary assessments, environmental assessments, and respiratory support services. PHS is a durable medical equipment (DME) and supplies provider. PHS respiratory therapists are certified by the National Board of Respiratory Care.

Infusion therapy combines pediatric care, infusion therapy, and homecare to meet the needs of children. PHS offers infusion therapy, pharmacy, and nutrition support. Infusion nurses make home visits and instruct family caregivers on home infusion services and administration of medication.

PHS provides pharmacy services with medications and supplies, recommendations for therapy adjustments, clinical monitoring, specialty pharmacy services, and on-site sterile product compounding.

Home care nursing from PHS care for medically-complex children in the home.

PHS also provides support services. The organization provides education (classes for health professionals and training for family caregivers, classroom instruction, training materials, one-to-one mentoring, competency testing, and community outreach events), nutrition (education, assistance, and advice designed to meet specific nutritional needs of children), medical social work services (transportation, housing, counseling), customer support services (insurance verification, product delivery), and has an on-site warehouse.

Generally, pediatric home health care results in fewer trips to the emergency room, fewer hospitalizations, fewer school days missed, lower costs, improved development, and a better quality of life for children and their families.

== History ==
Susan Wingert founded the company as Pediatric Home Respiratory Service in St. Paul, Minn., in 1990; there were six initial employees. In 1993, the company earned accreditation by The Joint Commission for the first time. In 1997, Pediatric Home Respiratory Service (PHRS) changed its name to Pediatric Home Service (PHS). Later that year, PHS moved to its current location at 2800 Cleveland Avenue North in Roseville. The company reached 100 employees in 2005 and now employs 300.

In 2007, Wisconsin officially recognized PHS as an approved training facility for ventilation certification and re-certification. Also in 2007, PHS developed the STAR kit for caregivers to ensure they are properly trained for emergency procedures. In 2008, through its Sharing Care community giving program, PHS established a partnership with Faith’s Lodge, a retreat center in Danbury, Wisconsin, for families who face a child’s serious illness or death. PHS created the Sharing Caring community giving program to provide support to the Minnesota health care community and offer PHS employees opportunities to donate time to programs and events in the community that are directly associated with medically fragile and underprivileged children.

PHS was honored by the National Association of Pediatric Nurse Practitioners (NAPNAP) with its 2009 Organization of the Year award. The American Association for Respiratory Car] (AARC) named PHS a Quality Respiratory Care Provider.
