= Ram Gopal =

Ram Gopal may refer to:

- Ram Gopal (author) (born 1925), Indian writer and historian
- Ram Gopal Varma (born 1962), Indian screenwriter, film director/producer
- Ram Gopal (dancer) (1912–2003), Bangalore-born British dancer
- Ram Gopal Bajaj (born 1940), National School of Drama director
- Ram Gopal Yadav (born 1946), Indian politician

== See also ==
- Ram Gopal Varma Ke Sholay, 2007 Indian film
