= Roseville Area Schools =

School district in Minnesota, United States

- 1251 County Road B2 W Roseville, MN

District information
- Motto: Excellence, Innovation & Equity in All We Do
- Grades: K-12
- District ID: 623

Other information
- Website: www.isd623.org

Roseville Area Schools the school district of Roseville, Minnesota. It is also known as Independent School District 623.

== Schools ==
- Roseville Area High School
- Roseville Area Middle School
- Brimhall Elementary School
- Central Park Elementary School
- Edgerton Elementary School
- Emmet D. Williams Elementary School
- Falcon Heights Elementary School
- Harambee Elementary School
- Little Canada Elementary School
- Parkview Center School
- Fairview Community Center (Fairview Alternative High School)
