= Dodge Ram Van =

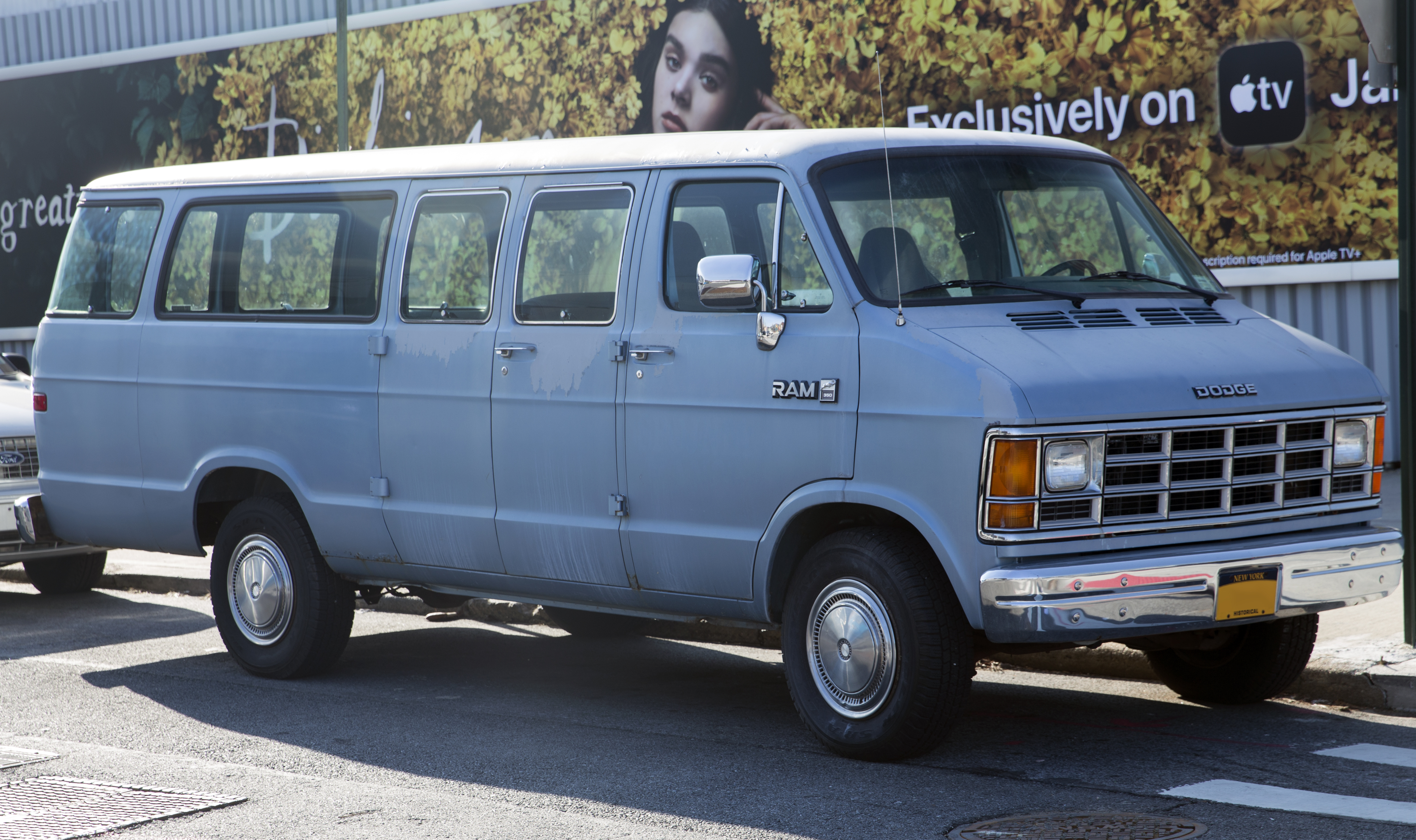

Overview
- Manufacturer: Chrysler Corporation (1971–1998); DaimlerChrysler (1998–2003)
- Production: 1970–2003
- Model years: 1971–2003
- Assembly: United States: Fenton, Missouri (St. Louis North Assembly Plant; 1970–1980); Canada: Windsor, Ontario (Pillette Road Truck Assembly; 1974–2003)

Body and chassis
- Class: Full-size van
- Body style: 3-door van 4-door van 3-door wagon 4-door wagon
- Layout: Longitudinal front-engine, rear-wheel drive
- Platform: Chrysler B platform

Chronology
- Predecessor: Dodge A100
- Successor: Dodge Sprinter

The Dodge Ram Van (originally the Dodge B series) is a range of full-size vans that were produced by Chrysler Corporation from the 1971 to 2003 model years. The B series replaced the forward control Dodge A100, transitioning to a front-engine, rear-wheel-drive layout that shared components with the D series pickup truck and had a conventional exterior hood for engine access. The model range consisted of a cargo van, a passenger van marketed as the Dodge Ram Wagon after introduction of the Ram nameplate for model year 1980, and a cutaway van chassis which was dropped in 1979.

With a 33-model year production run, the B series / Ram Van is among the longest-lived platforms in American automotive history. The exterior and chassis saw only gradual changes during that time, with three distinct generations developed. Alongside its use by Dodge, the full-size van range was rebadged during the 1970s for both Fargo Trucks and Plymouth (marking the debut of the Plymouth Voyager nameplate).

For the entire production run, Chrysler produced the vans at the now-demolished Pillette Road Truck Assembly plant in Windsor, Ontario, Canada; prior to 1980, the model line was also produced at Saint Louis Assembly in Fenton, Missouri. In 2003, the Dodge Sprinter (a rebranding of its Mercedes-Benz namesake) was introduced, replacing the Ram Van.

== Model overview ==
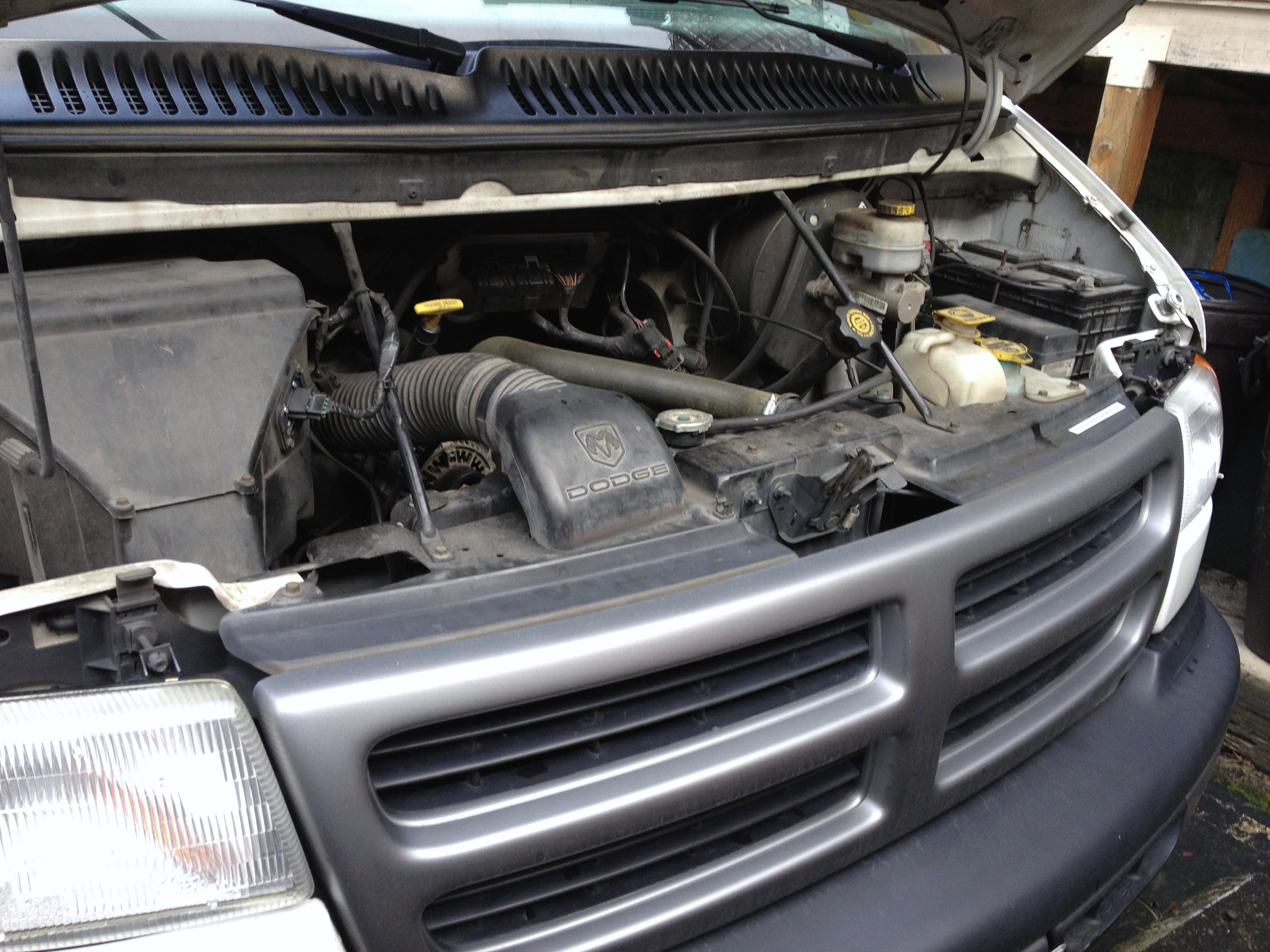
Ram Van (1998–2003) engine bay, showing hood access to engine accessories

Built on the B platform (later AB), the Dodge full-size vans entered production for the 1971 model year. Using a one-welded-piece "Uniframe" design, the platform was lighter and stronger, giving a lower cargo floor than previous American designs. While at the expense of noise, vibration, and harshness (NVH), the resulting lower center of gravity improved handling versus competing products with full frames.

Produced over three distinct generations, the B series van utilized the majority of body sheetmetal from 1971 to 2003. Alongside passenger and cargo vans, the model line also served as a basis for cutaway chassis during the 1970s, serving both commercial markets and as a basis for recreational vehicles. Though popular in the latter market, Chrysler Corporation would end production of that design as a consequence of its late 1970s financial difficulties.

The relatively limited changes for the model line across its production made the Dodge Ram van popular with fleet buyers, service companies, and upbuilders because of the compatibility of components across various model years.

In two size extremes to the market segment, Dodge was the first American manufacturer to popularize extended-length passenger vans, with the 1971 "Maxiwagon" introducing 15-passenger seating. Conversely, the Ram van was the final full-size short-wheelbase van, as the 109-inch wheelbase B1500 was offered through 2003.

== First generation (1971–1978) ==
First generation (Tradesman/Sportsman)
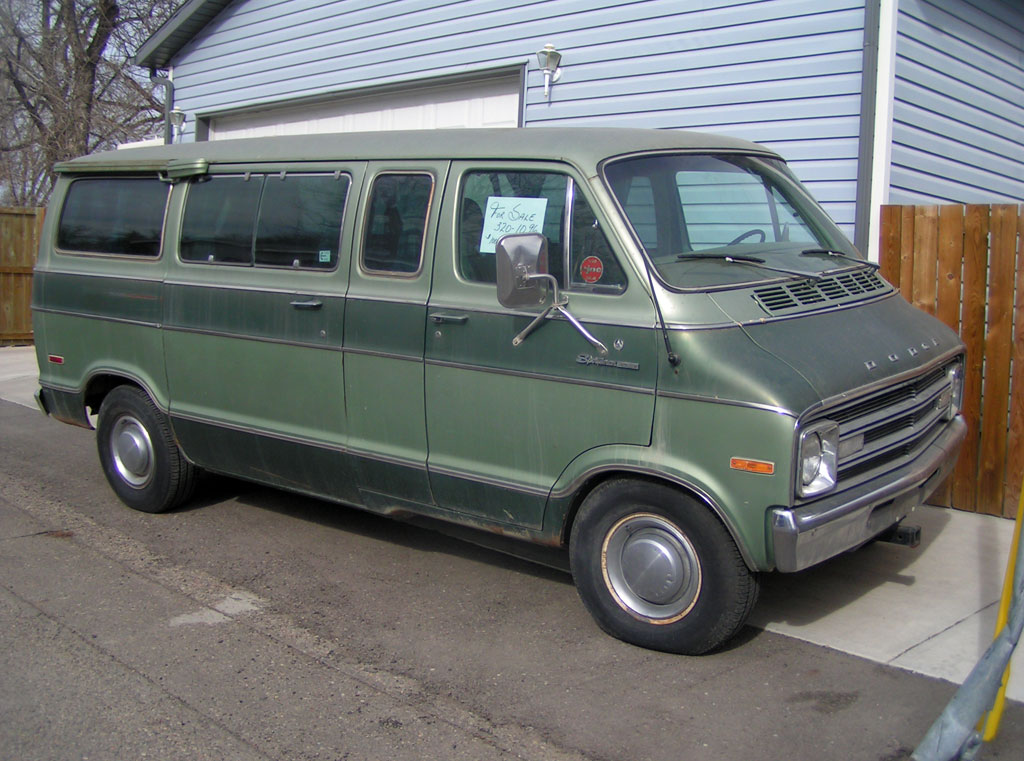

Overview
- Production: 1970–1978
- Model years: 1971–1978
- Assembly: United States: Fenton, Missouri (St. Louis North Assembly Plant); Canada: Windsor, Ontario (Pillette Road Truck Assembly; 1974–1978)

Body and chassis
- Related: Dodge 50 series Plymouth Voyager (1974–1978); Dodge D series

Powertrain
- Engine: 198 cu in (3.2 L) Slant-6; 225 cu in (3.7 L) Slant-6; 318 cu in (5.2 L) LA V8; 360 cu in (5.9 L) LA V8; 400 cu in (6.6 L) B V8; 440 cu in (7.2 L) RB V8
- Transmission: 3-speed manual 4-speed manual 3-speed automatic

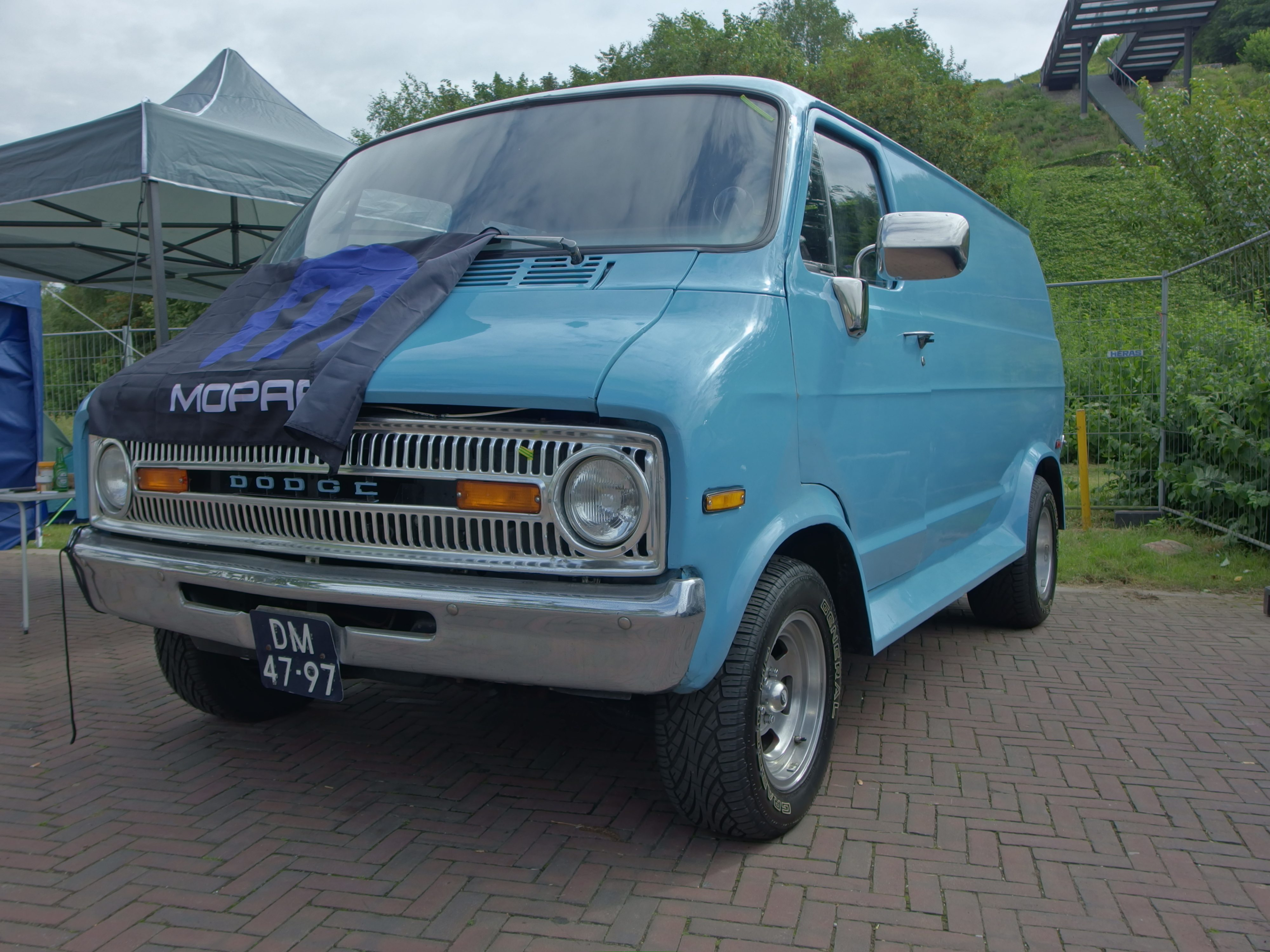
1971 Dodge Tradesman (customized)

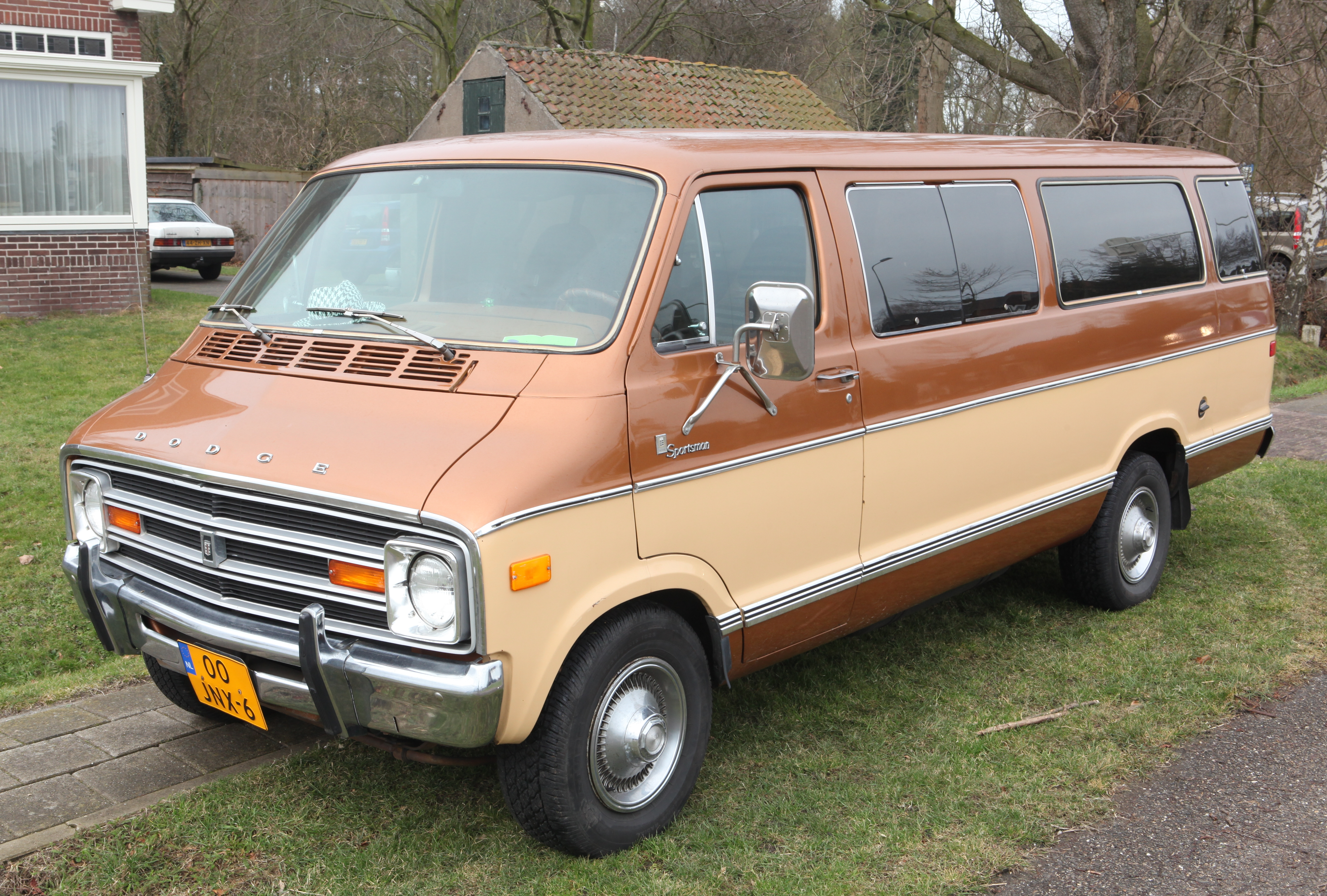
1978 Dodge Royal Sportsman 300 Maxiwagon

From 1971 to 1978, Dodge produced two models of the B series van: the Dodge Tradesman cargo van and the Dodge Sportsman passenger van. In line with the D-series pickup truck (which underwent a final redesign for 1972), the van was marketed with three payload series: ½-ton "100", ¾-ton "200", and 1-ton "300". Only five inches longer than its A100/A108 predecessor, moving the front axle forward allowed for a substantial increase in interior space.

Dodge introduced the Tradesman and Sportsman in two wheelbases: 109 inches and 127 inches. Initially introduced in two body lengths, an extended-length "Maxivan/Maxiwagon" variant was introduced during 1971. Consisting of an 18-inch rear body extension, the Sportsman Maxiwagon could be fitted with four rows of rear seats, allowing for up to 15 passengers. While the Tradesman was offered strictly as a cargo van, the Sportsman was offered in three distinct trims: Sportsman, Custom Sportsman, and Royal Sportsman, with the latter rivaling the Dodge Royal Monaco station wagon in equipment and trim.

Along with its highly sloped hoodline and short front fenders, this generation of the B series van is distinguished by several exterior design features. On passenger vans with the 127-inch wheelbase, the front passenger door and the rear side doors are separated by a filler panel (with a small window), with all body lengths (including the Maxiwagon) sharing the same side glass. The side windows are smaller in size, sharing a beltline with the front door glass.

Sharing its powertrain with the Dodge D-series pickup truck (redesigned for 1972), the van line was initially released with a 198 cubic-inch Slant-6 along with a 225 cubic-inch Slant-6 and a 318 cubic-inch V8. For 1972, the 198 was dropped with a 360 V8 becoming a second optional V8. For 1976, B200 and B300 vans gained the option of big-block 400 and 440 cubic-inch V8s. A three-speed manual was standard, with the options of a 4-speed manual (added in 1976) and a 3-speed automatic.

During its production, the first-generation vans saw gradual changes added each year. For 1972, front disc brakes were added along with full chrome door handles (replacing black push buttons). For 1973, electronic ignition replaced the previous points-type system and power brakes became standard. For 1974, a redesigned plastic grille was added (moving the Dodge lettering to the hood). To better match its Ford and GM competitors, the model line received a sliding door; initially offered on Maxivans/Maxiwagons, the configuration later became an option for the entire model line. For 1975, a new single-piece rear door became an option for Sportsman vans; the side-opening door remained unique to the B series line through the end of its production. 1976 saw the launch of the Street Van customization package for Tradesman vans (see below), with minor interior revisions; in 1977, the single-panel rear door became standard on all Sportsman vans.

For 1978, the B series van began a two-year transition towards its second generation. Much of the body behind of the rear doors was revised, deleting the filler panel of long-wheelbase vans; the side and rear windows now extended slightly below the beltline of the front doors; and the taillamps were enlarged, switching from a horizontal orientation to a vertical one. The interior underwent a major revision with an all-new dashboard, trim, and seats; upgraded interior controls were now shared with Chrysler cars. In another revision, smaller engine covers increased space for front-seat passengers. The extended-length Maxivan/Maxiwagon was now a 26-inch extension, with the Maxiwagon receiving wraparound corner windows to improve visibility.

=== Rebranding ===
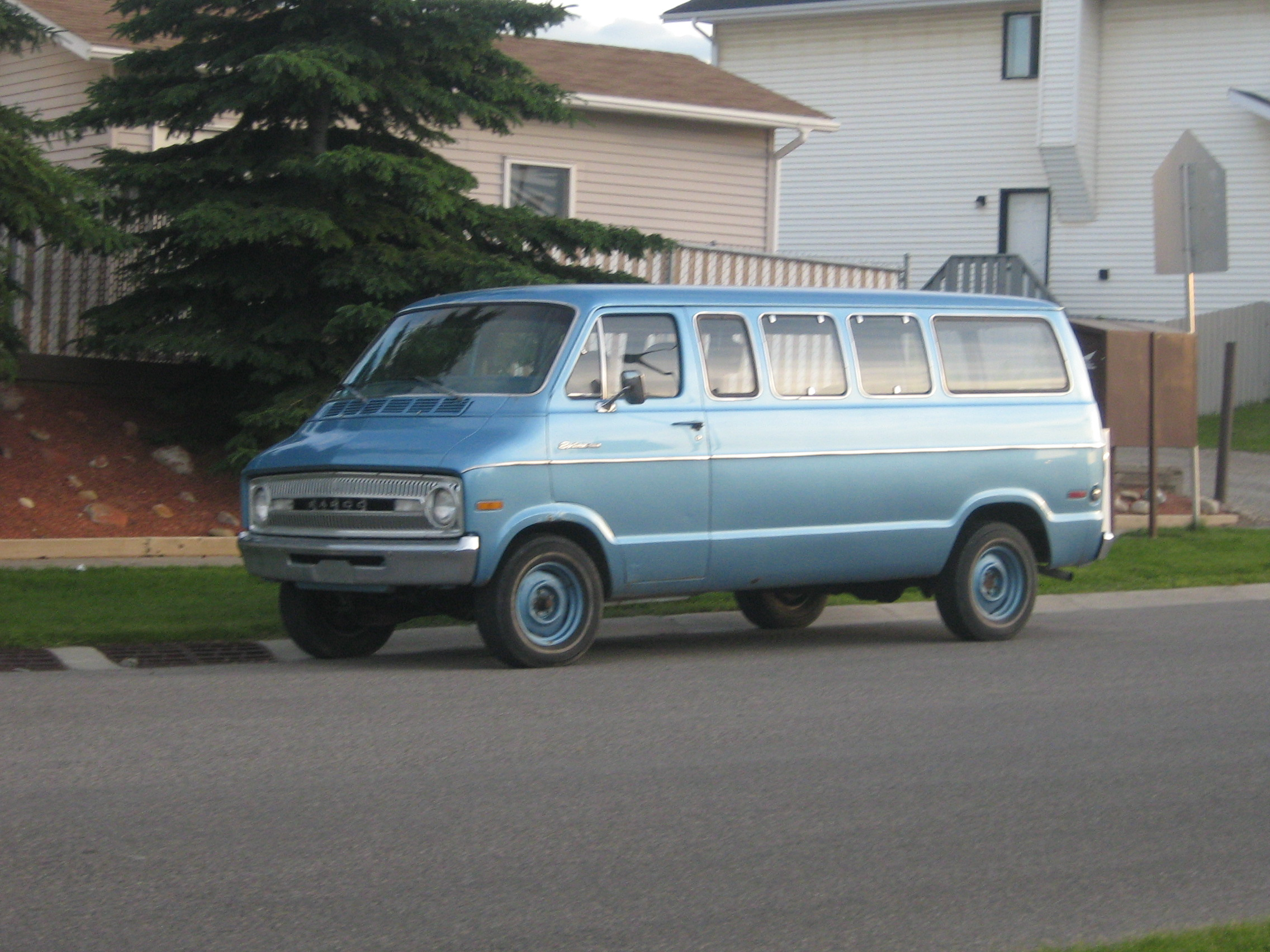
1971–1972 Fargo van

During the last two years of its existence, Fargo offered a rebadged variant of the Tradesman and Sportsman in Canada for 1971 and 1972 only. Plymouth also received a rebadged variant of the Sportsman, called the Voyager for the 1974 model year. While never as popular as the Dodge version, Plymouth marketed the Voyager in this format through 1983, after which the nameplate was transferred to the new minivan that was introduced for 1984 as a rebadged Dodge Caravan.

== Second generation (1979–1997) ==
Second generation (B150/250/350)
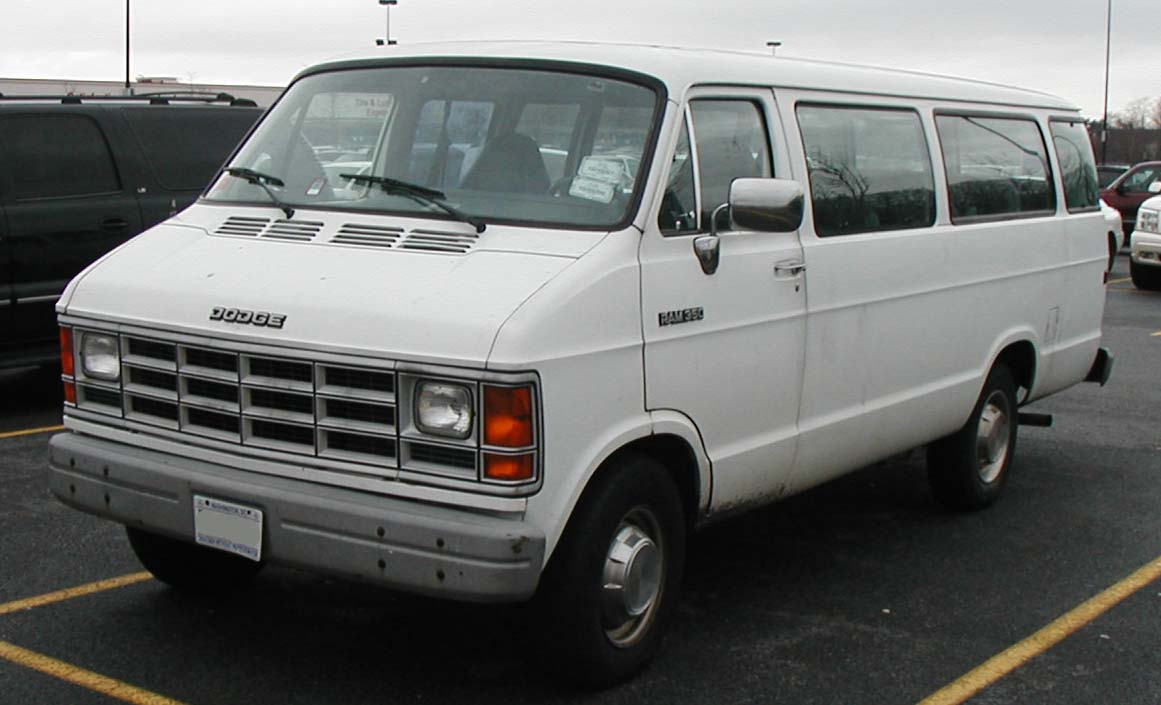

Overview
- Also called: Plymouth Voyager (1979–1983)
- Production: 1978–1997
- Model years: 1979–1997
- Assembly: United States: Fenton, Missouri (St. Louis North Assembly Plant; 1978–1980); Canada: Windsor, Ontario (Pillette Road Truck Assembly)

Body and chassis
- Related: Dodge Ram; Dodge 50 series

Powertrain
- Engine: 225 cu in (3.7 L) Slant Six I6; 239 cu in (3.9 L) LA V6; 318 cu in (5.2 L) LA V8; 360 cu in (5.9 L) LA V8
- Transmission: 3-speed automatic 4-speed automatic 3-speed manual (column shift); 4-speed manual (floor shift); 5-speed manual (floor shift)

Dimensions
- Wheelbase: 150 SWB: 109.6 in (2,784 mm); LWB: 127.6 in (3,241 mm)
- Length: 1978–1990 150 SWB: 178.9 in (4,544 mm); 1978–1990 150 LWB, 250 & 350 SWB: 196.9 in (5,001 mm); 1978–1990 250 & 350 LWB: 222.9 in (5,662 mm); 1991–93 B150 (Wagon only): 187.2 in (4,755 mm); 1991–93 B250 and B350 SWB (Wagon only): 205.2 in (5,212 mm); 1991–93 B250 & B350 LWB (Wagon only): 231.2 in (5,872 mm)
- Width: 1978–1990: 79.2 in (2,012 mm); 1991–93 Wagon: 79.0 in (2,007 mm); 1991–93 Van: 79.8 in (2,027 mm)
- Height: 1978–1990 150: 78.3 in (1,989 mm); 1978–1990 250: 79.9 in (2,029 mm); 1978–1990 350: 80.5 in (2,045 mm); 1991–93 B150 Wagon: 78.1 in (1,984 mm); 1991–93 B250 Wagon: 78.6 in (1,996 mm); 1991–93 B350 Wagon: 80.5 in (2,045 mm); 1991–93 B150 Maxi Wagon: 80.7 in (2,050 mm); 1991–93 Van (Extended): 80.1 in (2,035 mm)

For 1979, Dodge completed the two-year transition to its second-generation B series vans, with the front portion of the body undergoing a redesign. The front fascia received a taller hoodline and grille (styled in line with Dodge Ram pickup trucks), with parking lamps wrapping into the front fenders. Higher-trim Sportsman vans were fitted with four rectangular headlamps while lower-trim versions (and Tradesman cargo vans) were fitted with dual round headlamps.

In a change that would prove beneficial to Chrysler, the government reclassified the Sportsman passenger van as a truck (instead of a passenger car), substantially increasing the ability of the company to meet CAFE implementation.

After 1980, production ended at Saint Louis North Assembly (retooled to produce the Chrysler K cars), with all production subsequently sourced from Pillette Road Truck Assembly.

=== Model changes ===
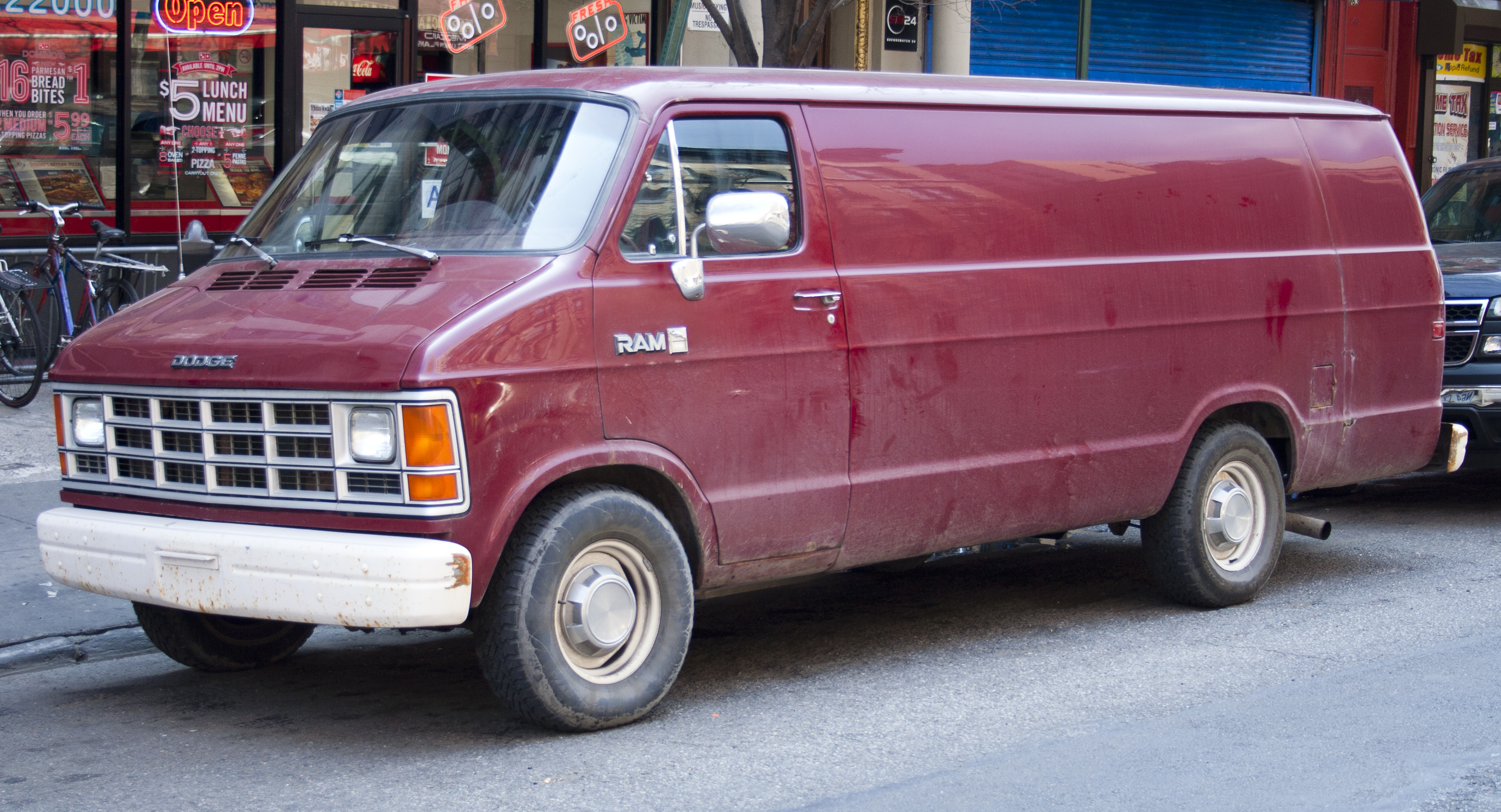
1986–1990 Dodge Ram B350 Maxivan cargo van

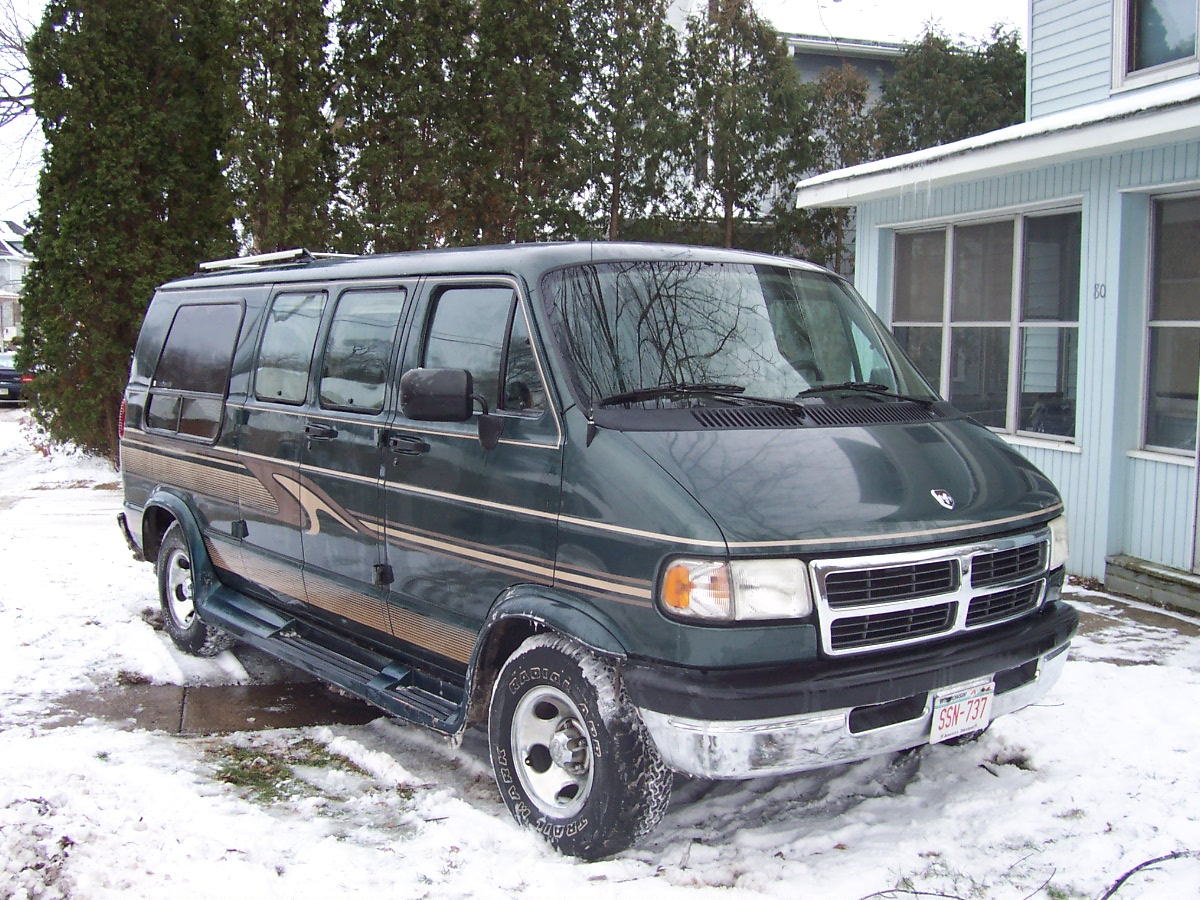
1996 Dodge Ram Van (facelift)

For 1980, the windows were revised, with sliding side doors receiving a single-pane window (in line with the single-panel rear door). For 1981, the model line underwent a major rebranding. In line with its pickup truck counterpart (which became the Dodge Ram pickup), the Dodge Tradesman and Sportsman nameplates were retired in favor of Dodge Ram Van and Wagon; the B series nomenclature remained, revised to B150, B250, and B350. Derived from the B150, the Mini-Ram was a higher-trim passenger van with a larger fuel tank.

For 1984, the Dodge Mini Ram and the Plymouth Voyager were retired from the B series line, as both nameplates became part of the Chrysler minivan line; Plymouth would not again offer a full-size truck prior to its discontinuation.

For 1986, the grille and badging trim were revised in line with Ram pickup trucks. In a safety upgrade, outboard seating positions received 3-point seatbelts for 1992.

For 1994, the model line underwent its most substantial revision and facelift since 1978. Distinguished by new front sheetmetal (adopting a grille styled in line with the redesigned Dodge Ram pickup trucks), the body shell underwent structural enhancements to improve crash protection. To modernize its appearance, exterior chrome brightwork was reduced (limited to the bumpers and grille). While the dashboard introduced for 1978 remained carryover, the interior saw revisions to the door panels and seats. In a branding change, the van line adopted the nomenclature of the Dodge Ram pickup trucks, becoming the B1500, B2500, and B3500. For 1995, a driver-side airbag was added.

=== Powertrain details ===
For the second-generation Ram vans, several changes were made to the powertrain line. Following the retirement of the big-block 400 and 440 V8s by Chrysler, the 360 V8 (found in 3/4-ton and 1-ton vans) now served as the largest-displacement engine (doing so through 2003).

The long-running 225 Slant-Six, found in half-ton and 3/4-ton vans, returned as the standard engine (later advertised in its 3.7 L metric displacement); for 1988, it was replaced by a 3.9 L LA V6 adopted from the Dodge Dakota. The 318 (later 5.2 L) returned as the standard V8 option for all models, adopting fuel injection for 1988 (the 5.9 L V8 doing so for 1989). For 1992, the "Magnum" generation of the 3.9 L and 5.2 L engines was introduced, featuring multiport fuel injection; the 5.9 L followed suit for 1993.

For 1979, Dodge planned to offer the Mitsubishi 4.0 L (243 CID) inline-six diesel engine (offered as an option on Dodge pickup trucks), but the option was shelved.

For 1980, the 3-speed column-shifted manual was retired in favor of the overdrive-equipped 4-speed (floor-shifted) manual. For 1988, the standard transmission became a 5-speed manual (with the 3.9 L V6); a 4-speed automatic became optional for the V6 and the 5.2 L V8, with a heavy-duty 4-speed automatic for the 5.9 L V8 added for 1990. As part of the 1994 update, manual transmissions were discontinued; Dodge became the final full-size van line to standardize automatic transmissions.

==== CNG powertrain ====
In 1991, Chrysler began development of a CNG-fueled version of the Ram Van, using the 5.2 L V8. After a short initial prototype production period, the variant was launched into larger-scale production for 1992; approximately 2,000 were produced primarily for fleet sales. From 1994 to 1998, Chrysler continued development with CNG powertrains using the Dodge Caravan.

== Third generation (1998–2003) ==
Third generation (B1500/2500/3500)
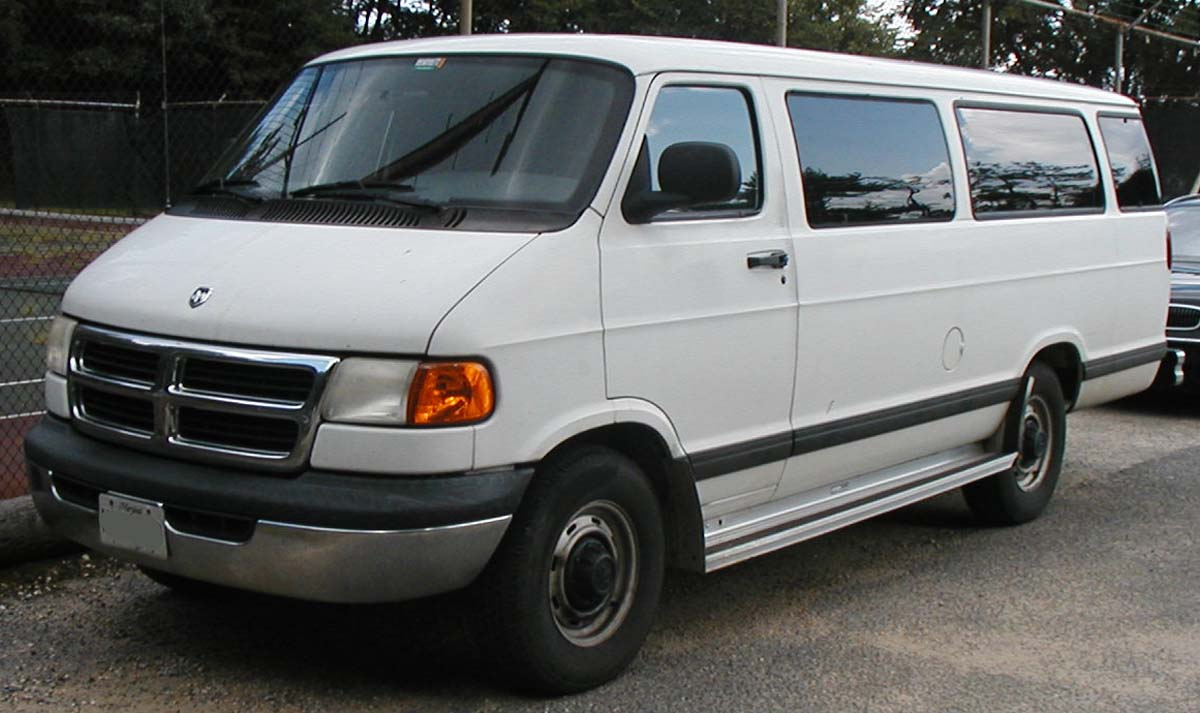

Overview
- Production: 1998–2003
- Model years: 1998–2003

Body and chassis
- Related: Dodge Ram; Dodge 50 series

Powertrain
- Engine: Magnum 3.9 L 175 hp (130 kW) V6; Magnum 5.2 L 230 hp (170 kW) V8; Magnum 5.9 L 250 hp (190 kW) V8
- Transmission: 3-speed automatic; 4-speed automatic

Dimensions
- Wheelbase: 1500 SWB: 109.4 in (2,779 mm); 2500 & 3500: 127.6 in (3,241 mm)
- Length: 1500: 187.2 in (4,755 mm); 2500: 205.2 in (5,212 mm); 3500: 231.2 in (5,872 mm)
- Width: 1998–2003 79.8 in (2,027 mm)
- Height: 1500: 79.5 in (2,019 mm); 3500 & 2500: 79.9 in (2,029 mm)

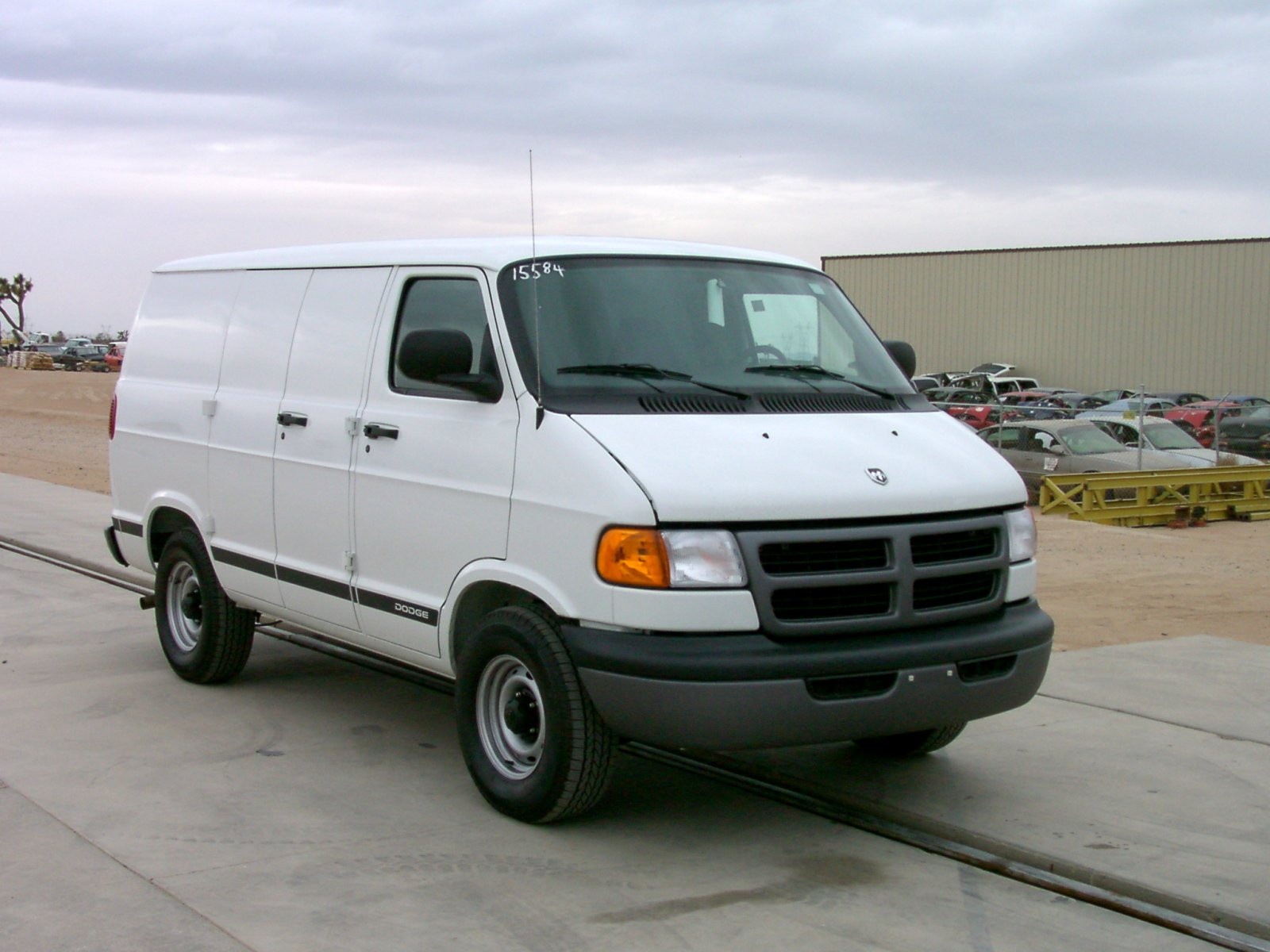
2001 Dodge Ram 1500 cargo van (SWB)

For 1998, the third-generation B series van was released. The most substantial revision of the model line since 1971, the body structure was upgraded to improve crash protection. Along with further reinforcement of the bodyshell, the powertrain was relocated further forward in the chassis (though wheelbases remained carryover), requiring a longer hood and front fenders.

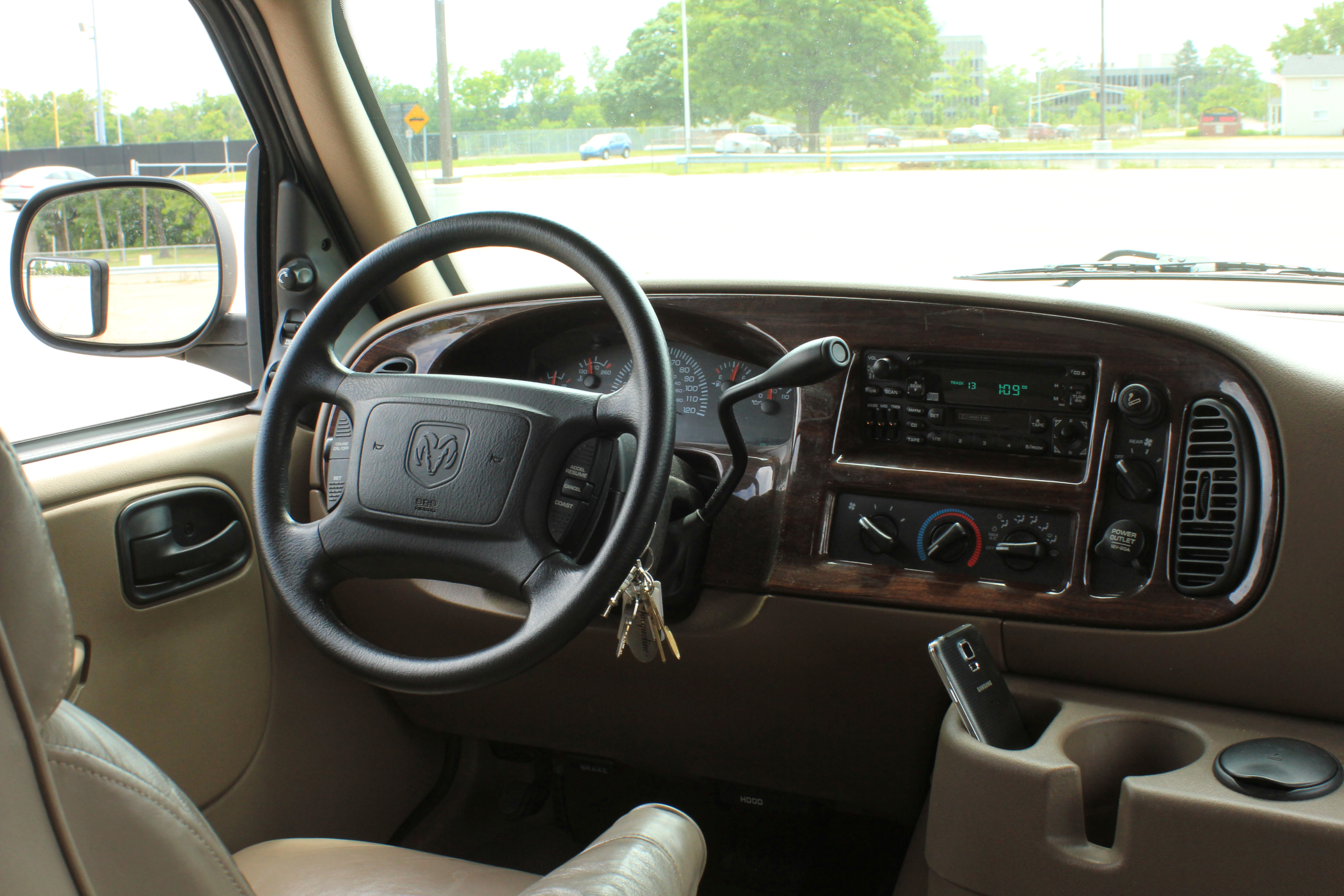
2003 Dodge Ram 1500 conversion van interior

Alongside the chassis upgrades, the interior underwent its first major redesign since 1978. Coinciding with its relocation forward, the engine cover was reduced in size, increasing space both between the front seats and for both front-seat passengers. The dashboard was redesigned, both to allow for the introduction of dual airbags and shared componentry with contemporary Chrysler vehicles. The front doors were distinguished by the deletion of the front vent windows, with the sideview mirrors relocated in their place (shared with the Dodge Ram/Dodge Dakota.To free up interior cargo space, the spare tire was moved from the interior to an underfloor location.

Through its production, the third-generation van saw few functional changes following its 1998 introduction. Carrying over the 3.9 L V6, 5.2 L V8, and 5.9 L V8 from the 1994 model revision, a 3-speed automatic was paired with the V6 and a 4-speed automatic was paired with the V8 engines. V8 engines were now standard on 3/4-ton and one-ton vans.

For 2003, the final model year of the Ram vans, the Ram 1500 van received rear vented disc brakes, becoming the only model of the B series to use a rear disc brake setup. The passenger van models were also discontinued.

== Variants ==
=== Street van ===
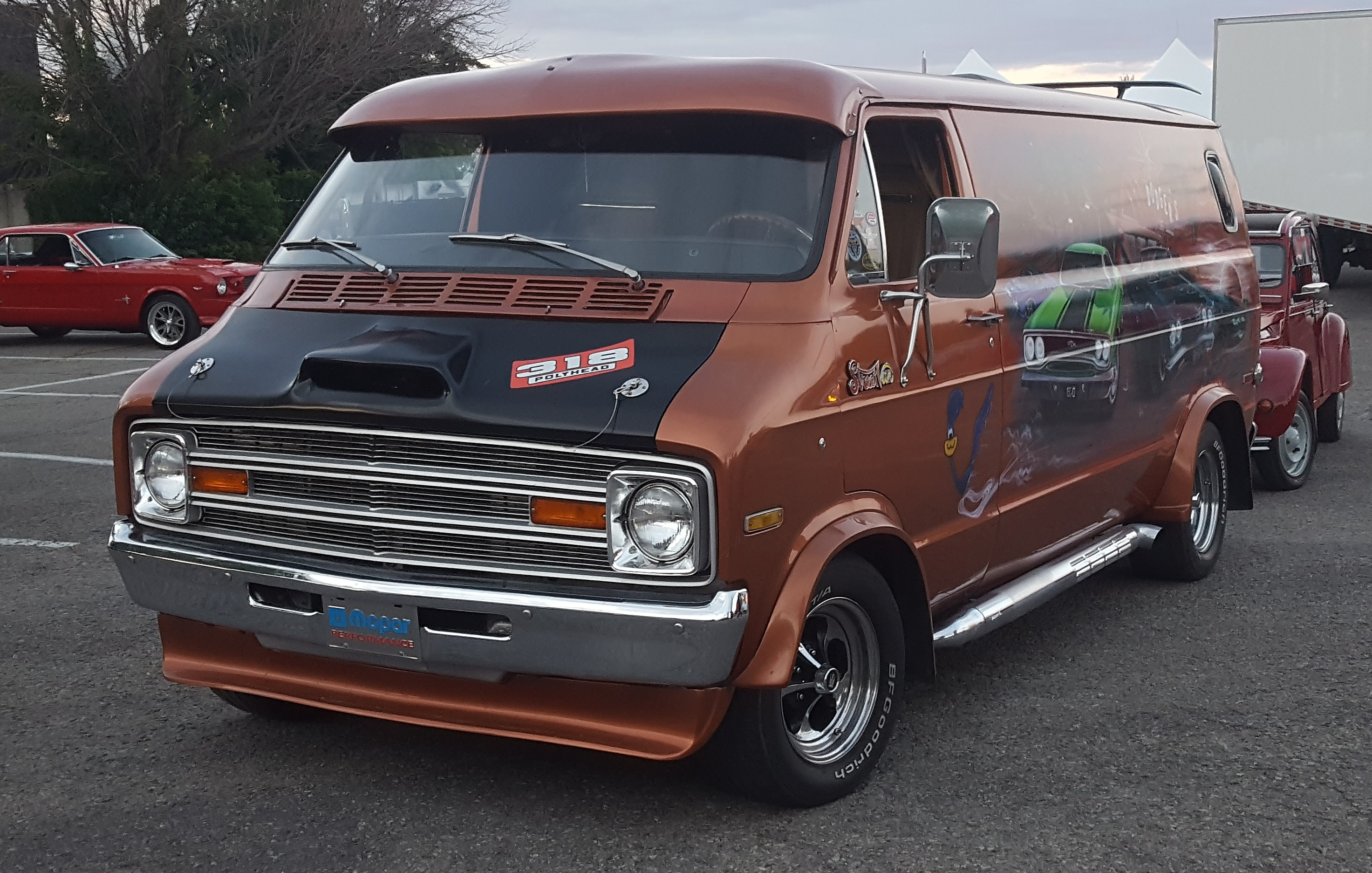
1976–1978 Dodge Tradesman "Street Van"

Dodge vans, particularly Tradesman vans from the 1971–1977 model years, were very popular as the basis for many custom vans during the custom van craze that occurred during the mid-to-late 1970s and early 1980s. Dodge capitalized on this craze, creating a factory customization package called the "Street Van" package.

This was advertised alongside the Lil' Red Express and Warlock trucks as "Adult Toys." The Street Van package consisted of a "Street Van" logo on the passenger and driver's side door in lieu of the Tradesman logos, chrome trim on the grille and windshield, simulated wood grain inlays in the steering wheel horn cover and passenger-side glare shield, five-slot chrome wheels or white spoked "off-road" type wheels, chrome front and rear bumpers, chrome trim on the gauges, smaller chrome side-view mirrors, patterns and plans to create custom interiors, and membership in the "Dodge Van Clan."

For 1976 and 1977 only, the YH_{3} Street Van could be ordered with a single driver seat, no dash pad, plain steering wheel, and Street Van door decal delete. The decals were placed in the glovebox at time of manufacture. Most of these were sent to conversion companies to be customized to customer specification. This package was available from the 1976 model year until it was discontinued in the early 1980s. This was not an overly popular option from the factory, and Street Vans are somewhat rare. The chrome-plated metal Street Van emblems found on later Street Vans (emblems through mid-1978 were stickers) in good shape are quite valuable to collectors or restorers.

=== Kary Van ===
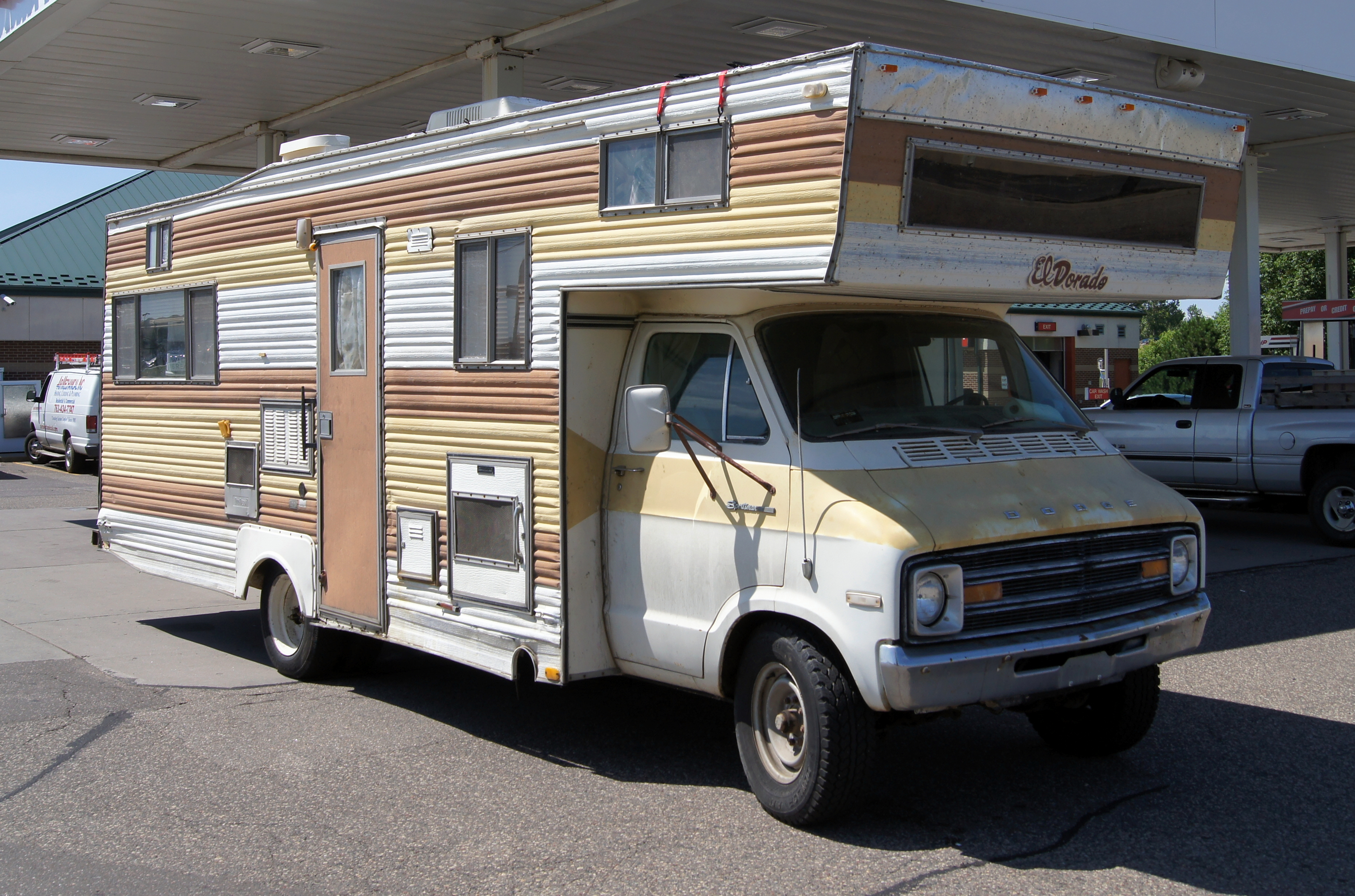
1975 Dodge Tradesman 300 cutaway cab with recreational vehicle body

For 1973, Dodge introduced the Kary Van variant of the B series. A factory-produced cutaway van fitted with a cube van rear body, the Kary Van was produced in 10- and 12-foot lengths and two widths (derived from single- or dual-rear-wheel axle configuration).

Derived from the B300 Tradesman, the cutaway body of the Kary Van would also serve as a basis underpinning bodies for Type C recreational vehicles during the 1970s. In 1979, Chrysler ended production of the variant in response to its financial difficulties.

=== Dodge 50 series ===
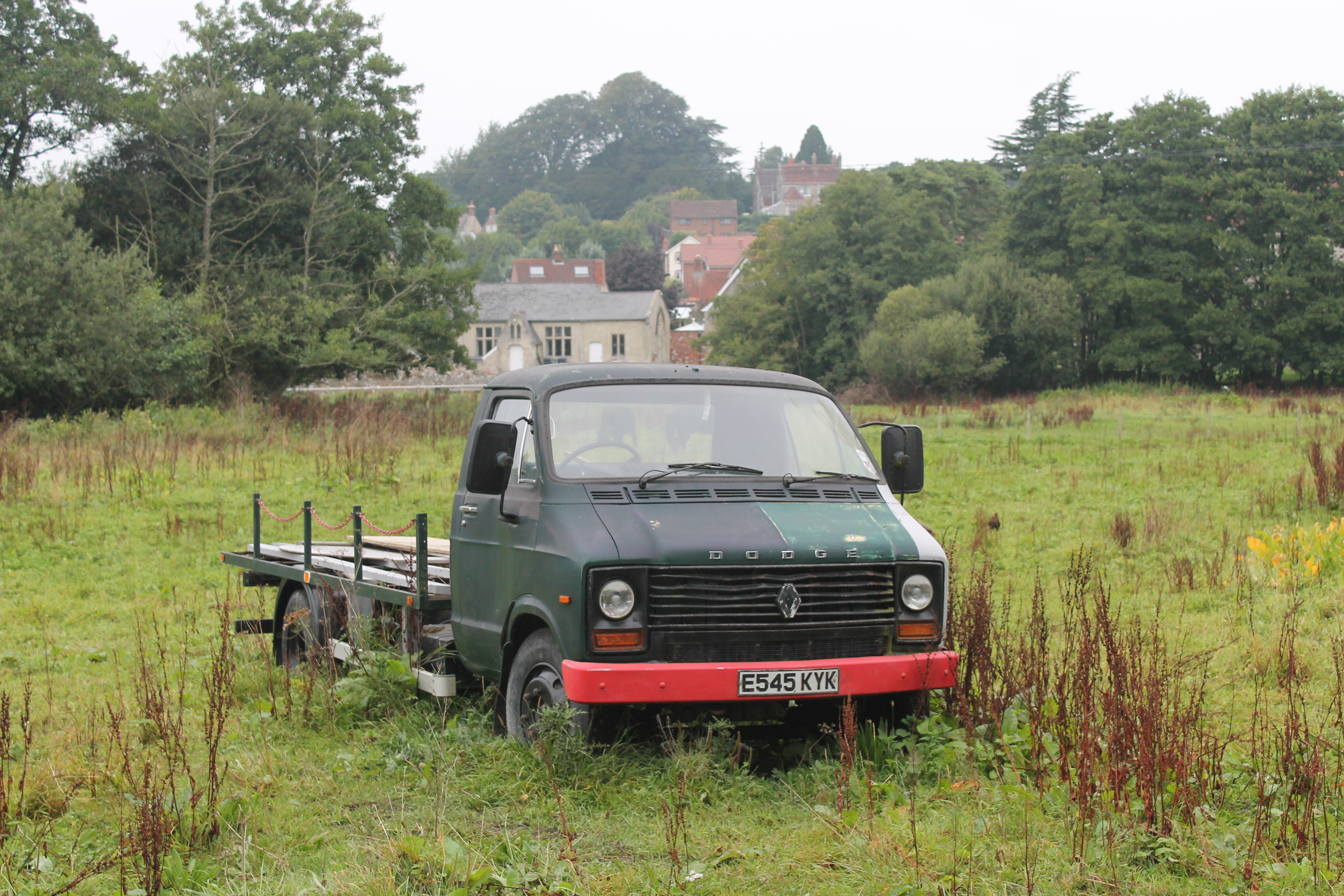
1987 Dodge/Renault 50 Series

The Dodge 50 series is a light commercial vehicle that was built by Chrysler Europe (and later Renault Trucks) from 1979 to 1993. Using the cab assembly of the 1971–1978 Dodge Kary Van, the Dodge 50 mated the American-designed cab with a British-designed chassis. The model line was powered by Peugeot/Renault gasoline engines and Perkins 4-cylinder diesel engines.

Following the collapse of Chrysler Europe, the model line continued to be manufactured by Renault, which phased out the Dodge branding entirely after 1987. After 1993, Renault phased out the model line in favor of its own Renault Master.

== Nameplate revival ==
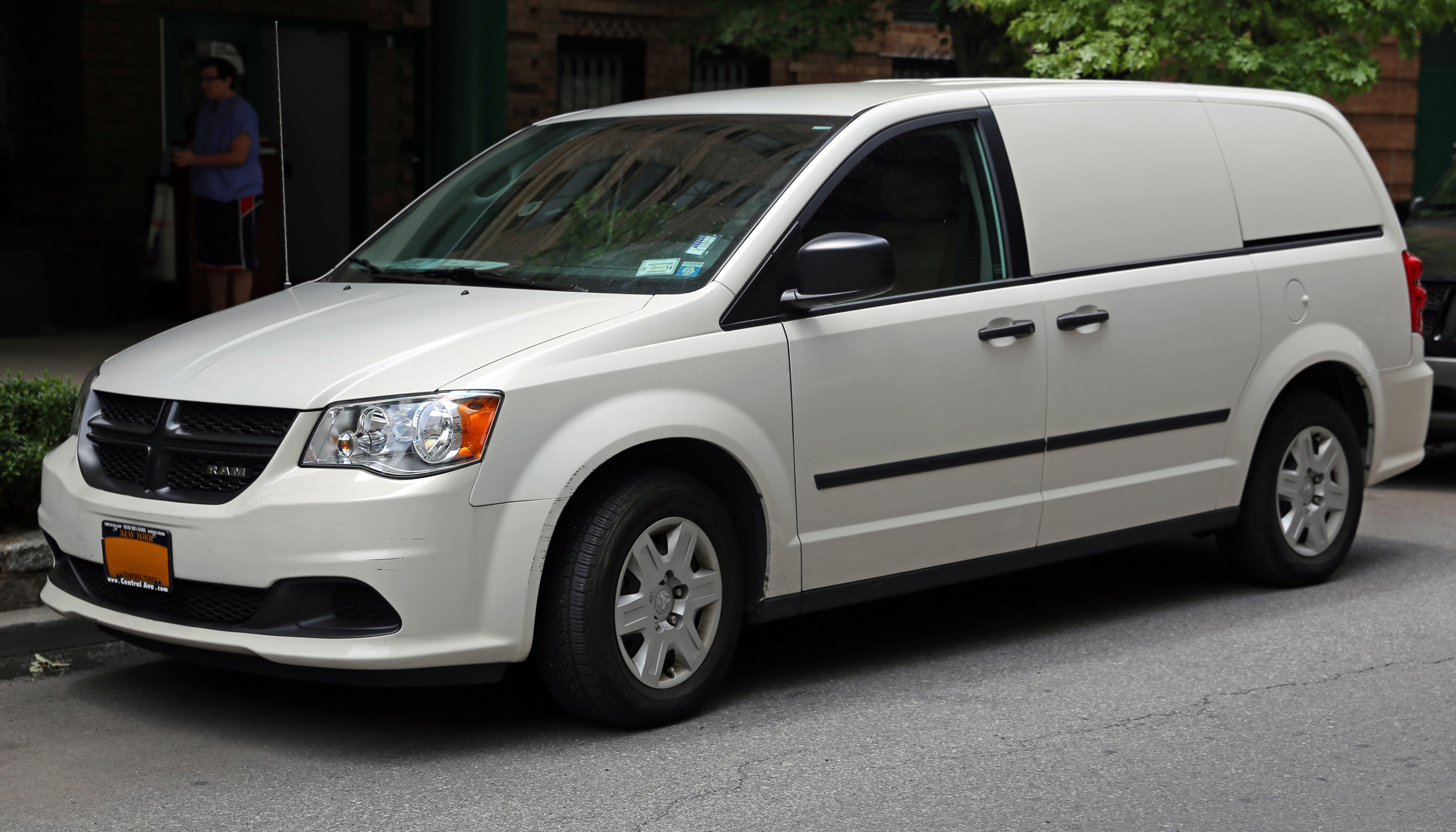
2012 Ram C/V Tradesman

In 2012, Chrysler's Ram brand revived the Tradesman nameplate as the Dodge Grand Caravan C/V cargo van was rebranded as the Ram C/V Tradesman. Sold only as a two-passenger cargo van, the Tradesman replaced the rear side windows with metal panels and was fitted with a flat rear load floor. After 2015, the Ram ProMaster City (based on the Fiat Doblò) replaced the C/V Tradesman.

== See also ==
- Dodge A100
- Dodge Ram C/V
- Ford E-Series
- General Motors van
- Ram ProMaster
