= List of vehicles named Dodge Ram =

Dodge Ram was a nameplate used for light trucks and vans marketed by Chrysler under its Dodge brand from the 1981 model year until Ram Trucks was spun off as a separate brand for the 2011 model year.

Pickup trucks:

- Dodge Ram (1980–2010), full-size pickup truck previously marketed as Dodge D series (W series with four-wheel drive), rebranded simply as Ram under the Ram Trucks brand; includes Ram 150, Ram 250, Ram 350, Ram 1500, Ram 2500, and Ram 3500
- Dodge Ram 50 (1980–1986), compact pickup truck previously marketed as Dodge D50; based on Mitsubishi Mighty Max

Vans:

- Dodge Ram Van (1980–2003), full-size van previously marketed as Dodge B series
  - Dodge Ram Wagon (1980–2003), passenger version of Dodge Ram Van
- Dodge Mini Ram (1983–1988), cargo version of Dodge Caravan minivan

== See also ==
- Dodge Caravan C/V, rebranded Dodge Mini Ram
- Dodge D series, full-size Dodge pickup truck before Dodge Ram rebranding
- Dodge Ramcharger, full-size SUV based on the D series and the first vehicle to use the Ram name
- Dodge Rampage, compact coupe utility
