= Ram Charan (disambiguation) =

Ram Charan (born 1985) is an Indian actor.

Ram Charan may also refer to:

- Ramcharan, an Indian male given name
- Ram Charan (guru) (1720–1799), Indian Hindu religious figure
