= Ram's horn =

Ram’s horn or ram horn usually refers to the spiral bony projection grown on the head of a male sheep (ram). It may also refer to:

- Ram's Horn (restaurant), a restaurant chain based in Detroit, Michigan, US
- Ram's horn (shoe), or pigache, a type of shoe with a long, pointed, turned up toe
- Ram's horn (letter), a Latin letter used in the IPA and the alphabets of some languages
- Musical instruments made from the horn of a ram:
  - Bukkehorn, an ancient Scandinavian musical instrument
  - Shofar, a horn used as a musical instrument in Judaism
- Onychogryphosis, a medical condition which produces toenails known as "ram's horns"
- Proboscidea (plant), a genus of plants

== See also ==
- Ramshorn
