= Ram Island =

Ram Island or Ram's Island may refer to:

== Australia ==
- Ram Island (Tasmania)
- Ram Island (Victoria)

== Indonesia ==
- Ram Island (Indonesia), in West Papua

== United Kingdom ==
- Ram's Island, Northern Ireland

== United States ==
- Ram Island (Connecticut), in Connecticut, United States
- Ram Island (Massachusetts), in the Merrimack River, Massachusetts, United States
- Ram Island, also called Big Ram Island, in New York, United States, joined by causeway to Shelter Island
- Ram Island (Washington), part of the San Juan Islands, Washington, United States

=== Maine ===
- Ram Island (Booth Bay), in Booth Bay, Maine, near Fisherman's Island, south of Ocean Point
  - Its lighthouse, Ram Island Light
- Ram Island (Casco Bay), in Casco Bay, Maine, United States, close to the Ram Island Ledge
  - Its lighthouse, Ram Island Ledge Light
- Ram Island (Saco Bay), off Saco, Maine, owned by the University of New England
