= Murders of Tay Chow Lyang and Tony Tan Poh Chuan =

Double murder of Singaporeans in Australia

Sydney double murders
- Date: 15 September 2003
- Location: Sydney, Australia
- Motive: Undetermined (unsolved)
- Deaths: Tay Chow Lyang; Tony Tan Poh Chuan
- Suspects: Ram Puneet Tiwary (acquitted)

On 15 September 2003, two Singaporean students and flatmates Tay Chow Lyang (郑潮亮) (b. 1977–d. 15 September 2003) and Tony Tan Poh Chuan (陈宝川) (b. 3 December 1976–d. 15 September 2003), were found brutally murdered in their apartment in Sydney. The boys' fellow classmate and friend Ram Puneet Tiwary (born 1979), also a Singaporean, was accused of these two violent murders. The case, dubbed the "Sydney double murders" in media, made headlines in both Singapore and Australia.

Three years after the murders, Tiwary was convicted for the murders of Tan and Tay, and received a sentence of life without parole for the murders. After filing an appeal, a re-trial was ordered and conducted in 2009 for Tiwary, who was once again found guilty in the second trial and received a sentence of 48 years' imprisonment. After the higher courts of Australia reviewed the case, Tiwary was finally acquitted upon his second appeal and freed nine years after the murders. The murders remain unsolved and no new suspects have been identified.

== Murder ==
On 15 September 2003, two Singaporeans – 26-year-old Tay Chow Lyang and 27-year-old Tony Tan Poh Chuan – were found murdered in their apartment in Sydney, Australia. Tay had been bludgeoned to death and Tan was murdered when he returned from a university lecture. The victims' 24-year-old flatmate and fellow Singaporean, Ram Puneet Tiwary, who happened to be asleep in his room at the time of the murders, was awakened by sounds of violence. He locked himself in his room and called the ambulance and police upon seeing his flatmates' bodies. Tiwary, together with both Tay and Tan, attended the same class at the University of New South Wales (UNSW) at that time for an engineering course on an army scholarship.

== Trials, appeals and acquittal ==
Initially a police witness, Tiwary was charged with murder nine months later, on 28 May 2004. The prosecution alleged that Tiwary may have possible motives to commit the crime. They claimed Tiwary owed Tay Chow Lyang A$5,045 in rent, a claim which Tiwary disputed. Police also alleged that Tiwary owed UNSW fees. It was alleged that a dispute had erupted between Tiwary and Tay that morning, resulting in the death of Tay and that the death of Tony Tan Poh Chuan was committed to cover up the earlier act. At the first trial, a 12-member jury found Tiwary, who maintained his innocence throughout, guilty of the double murder. He was sentenced to life imprisonment without parole for Tan's murder while receiving a concurrent 25 years' imprisonment for Tay's murder in 2006. In his memoir, Tiwary posited a possibility that racism could have been behind his guilty verdict. During his period of imprisonment, fights with other inmates left him with a partial loss of sensation in his right thumb and a scarred left shoulder.

Tiwary filed an appeal and, in 2008, the Court of Appeal set aside both Tiwary's life sentence and conviction, and ordered a re-trial based on a review of the evidence, concluding that it did not amount to a murder conviction and the improper directions the judge made to the jury in deciding their verdict. The jury at the 2009 re-trial once again returned with a guilty verdict, this time in a majority decision. Tiwary was sentenced to 48 years' imprisonment. Tiwary made a second appeal against his conviction and sentence in 2012. The second appeal was focused on Tiwary's tone in his phone call to the ambulance, the victims' unusual behaviour on the day of the murder as witnessed by several people and the forensic evidence. The Court of Appeal decided that the evidence against Tiwary was not satisfactory and acquitted him of the charges two days after the hearing, 26 July 2012.

== Aftermath ==
After his acquittal, Tiwary was detained at Villawood Immigration Detention Centre for six weeks while prosecutors decided whether there were grounds to appeal the acquittal. He was also waiting for his new Singaporean passport to be made by the Singapore High Commission in Canberra, Australia in order to leave Australia. On 19 September 2012, Tiwary once again stepped onto Singaporean soil. He declined to speak to reporters out of respect for the bereaved families of his two dead flatmates.

When told of the news of Tiwary's acquittal, Tony Tan's family expressed shock over the news and were said to be at a loss over the events. Tan's mother Mdm Chiew Lee Hua, then aged 64, said to the press, "My heart is in pain. If it wasn't him, then who was it?". The family of Tay Chow Lyang could not be contacted. Back in Australia, the prosecution confirmed they would not appeal against the decision of the appellate court.

After returning to Singapore, Tiwary penned a memoir titled 99 Months: The Case Of The Sydney Double Murders, which covers the case, as well as Tiwary's two trials, his experiences in prison, appeals and his eventual acquittal. It was published in September 2014. It is mentioned in an article that Tiwary had made a trip around the world after his return to Singapore, and did not complete the mechanical engineering degree from Sydney. Other than that, Tiwary did not make any further comments about his private life. Even till then, he still struggles with his trauma from the events that occurred from the murders to the 8 years of incarceration.

The case was made into a documentary by Channel NewsAsia (CNA) but Tiwary and his family declined to appear on screen. Tony Tan's parents Mr Tan Wee Sea and Mdm Chiew Lee Hua, and his sister Tan Poh Lin, were approached to talk about their feelings regarding the case, while Tay's family remains uncontactable.

The murderer(s) of Tay and Tan were not found.
