= Spruce Tree Centre =

Building in Saint Paul, Minnesota

Coordinates: 44°57′19″N 93°10′3″W

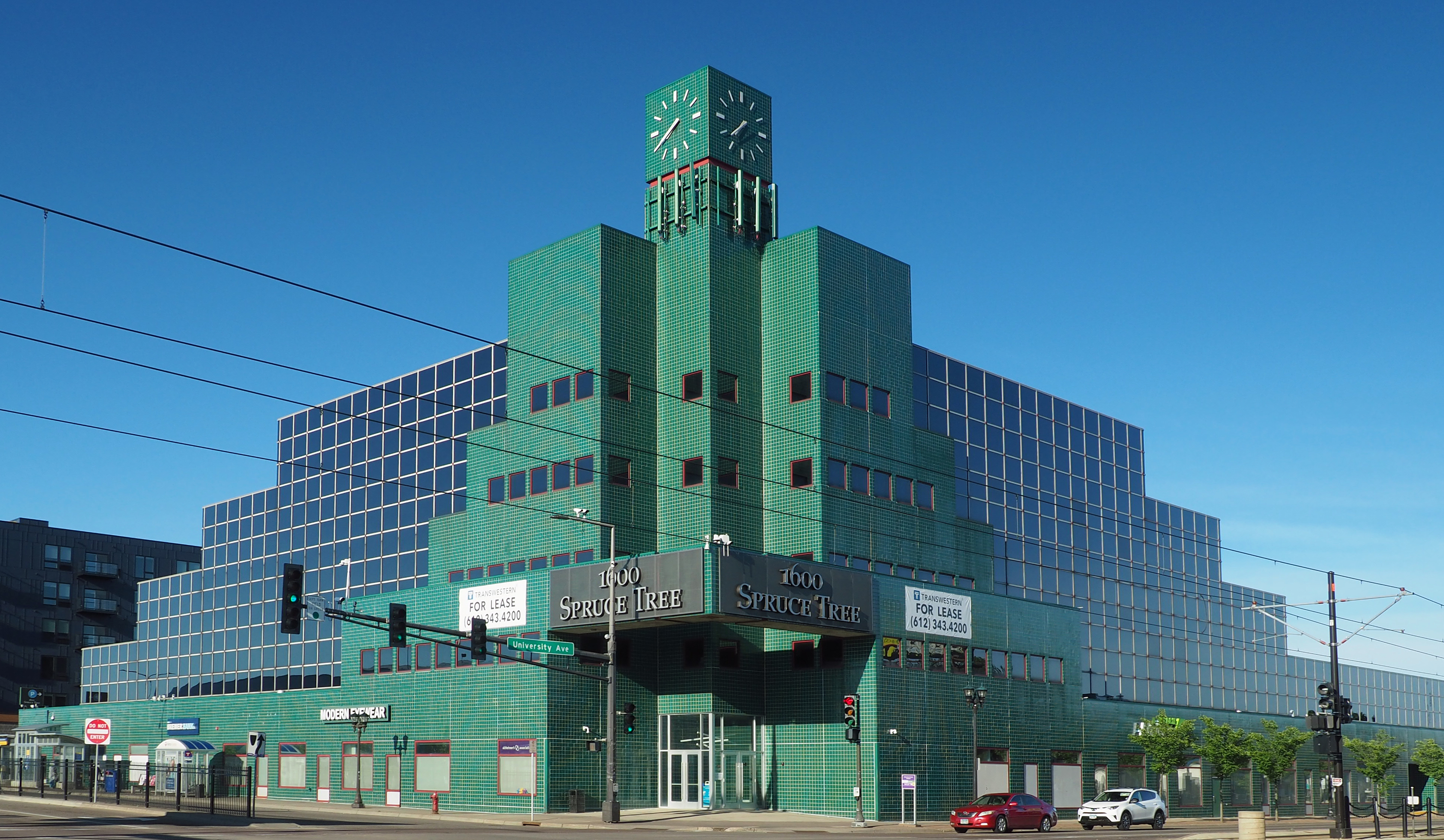
Spruce Tree Centre viewed from the northeast

The Spruce Tree Centre is a building in Saint Paul, Minnesota, United States. Located at the intersection of University Avenue and Snelling Avenue, the 126,000 square feet (11,700 m^{2}) building was built in 1988. An attached parking garage has over 350 spaces. The city of Saint Paul owns the parking garage and has electric car chargers. The building replaced a drug store built in the 1920s.

A 37-kilowatt solar panel system was installed on top of the building in 2010 as part of an initiative to install solar power prior to the opening of the Metro Green Line. The panels cost about $350,000 with most of the cost covered by an Xcel Energy grant. Since 2012, the building has been LEED certified and is currently rated Gold.

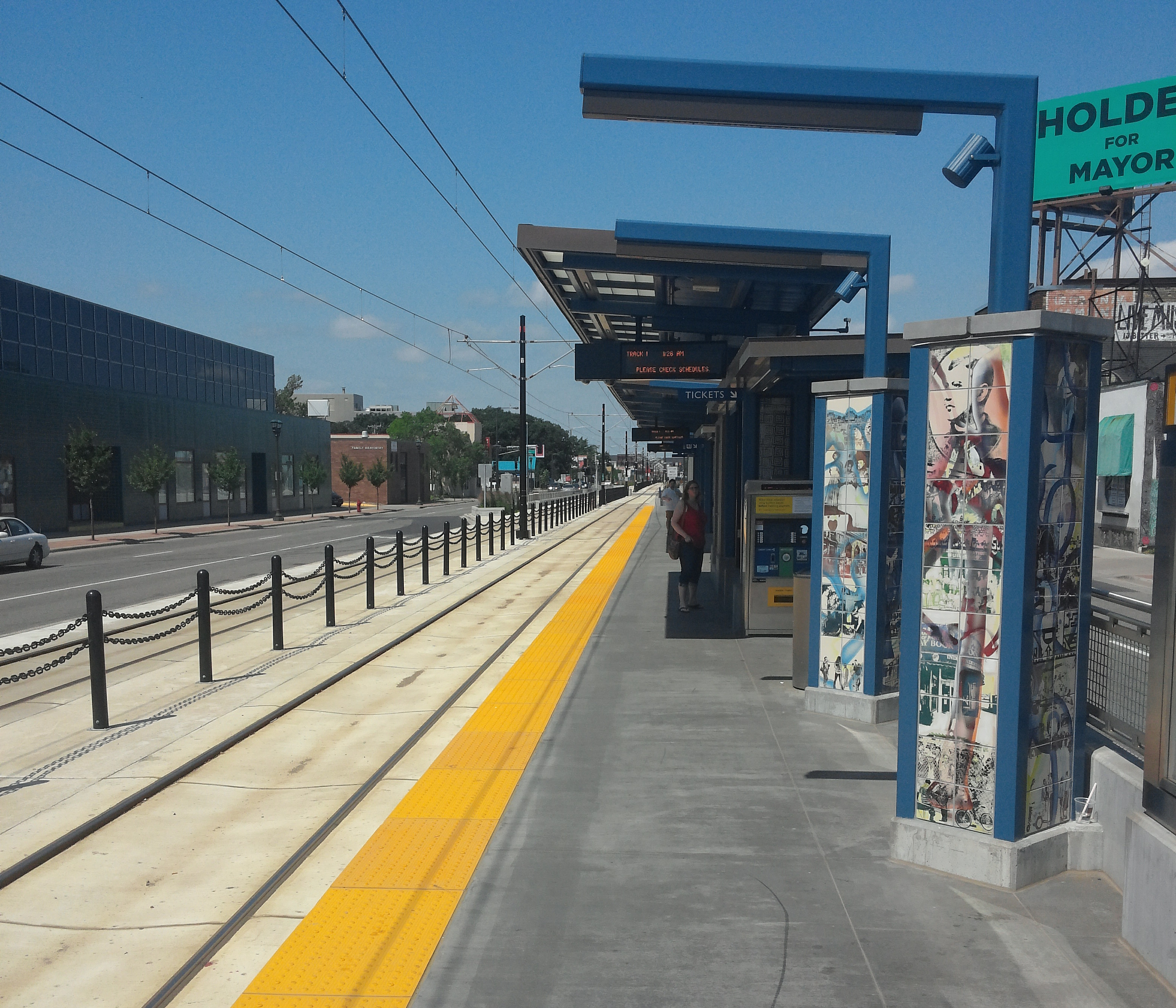
Snelling Avenue Station of the Green Line with the Spruce Tree Centre to the left

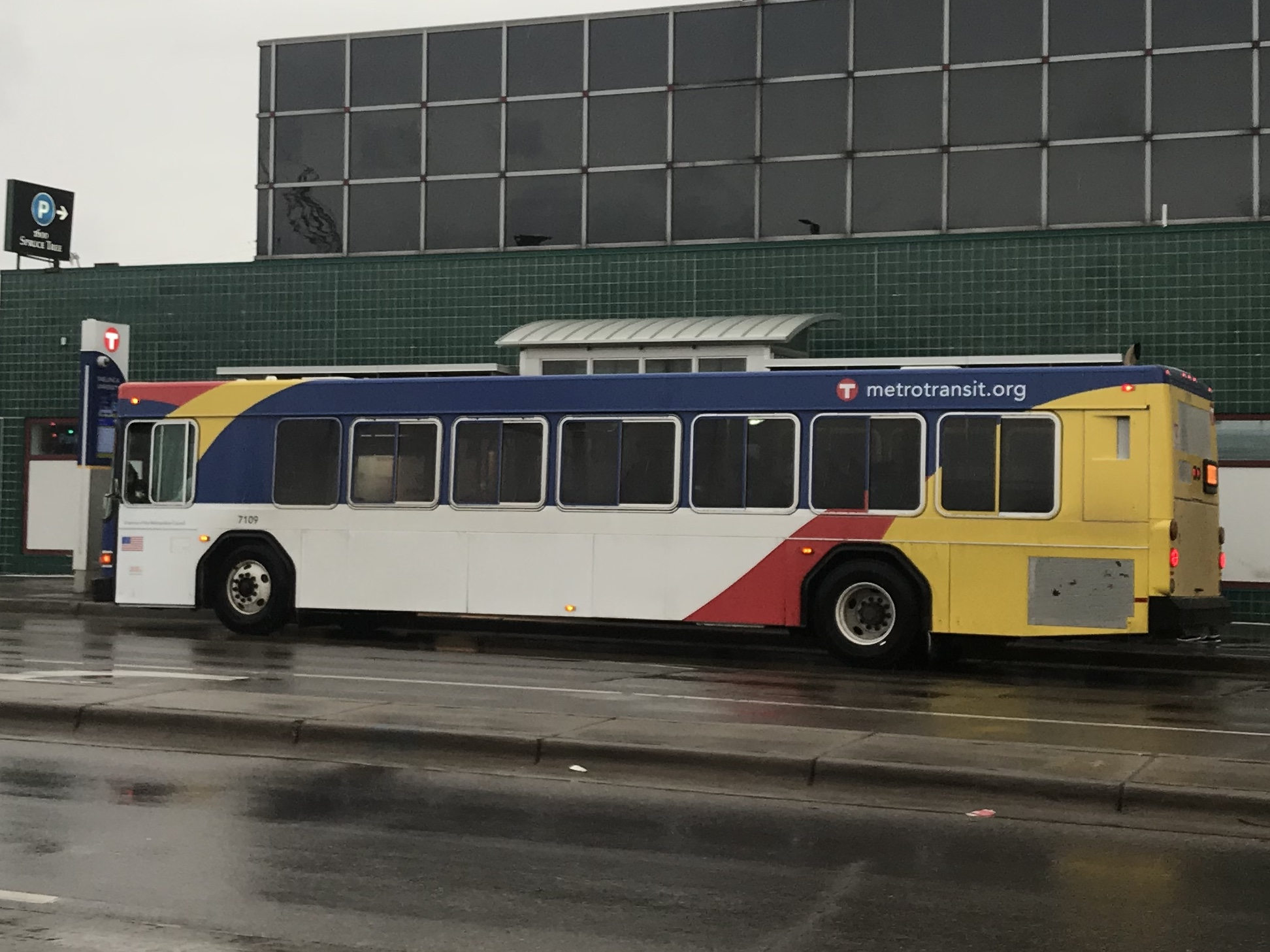
The southbound A Line station with the Spruce Tree Centre in the background

Across the street is the Snelling Avenue Station of the Metro Green Line. Adjacent to the building is a Metro A Line station. The building was described as a model, albeit needing improvement, for transit and pedestrian supportive infrastructure on the Snelling Avenue corridor.

== Construction and tenants ==
Marie Slawik led the design and impetus for construction. Marie Slawik and her husband Harold Slawik were active in business in Saint Paul and Roseville. Their first names of 'Harold' and 'Marie' were used for the Har Mar Mall located due north in Roseville. The building was intended to be a mixed-use urban mall, similar to Seven Points in Minneapolis. Tax-increment financing helped fund construction, and the attached parking ramp was built with public money used bonds that were paid off in 2015.

The building architect was BRW Architects, a Minneapolis-based company. Construction began in July 1987 amid a wave of interest in redeveloping land around University Avenue and the Midway neighborhood. The project was expected to cost almost $18 million with $3 million in tax increment financing. The building was designed to have 40,000 square feet (3,700 m^{2}) in retail space and 74,000 square feet (6,900 m^{2}) in office space. At the time the intersection of University Avenue and Snelling Avenue exceeded federal standards for carbon monoxide levels but the building was expected to help reduce concentrations by changing traffic patterns and air currents. Leasing after the initial opening was slower than expected. Vacancies were high for several years after opening.

The original design as a mixed-use retail and office building faltered as did many other 1980s office-retail projects. The building was sold for $1.5 million in 1992 to a Boston real estate company at the same time as the sale of Har Mar Mall. The building was again sold in 1994 with roughly half the building unoccupied. The new owners pivoted away from leasing towards retail tenants toward office space. By 1996 the building was almost 97% leased. The building is now almost exclusively office space.

Applebee's was the first tenant of the building in September 1988. The restaurant was located in the building for 19 years until 2007. About half of the tenants in 2010 were non-profits. A major tenant is a physical therapy company that installed a pool on the first floor. The building had 30 tenants and was over 80% occupied in 2015 when it underwent a $1.4 million renovation. The Hamline-Midway and Union Park neighborhoods groups are moving to the Spruce Tree Centre in 2024.

== Architectural design and reception ==
The exterior is clad in green bathroom tiles imported from Germany. The green color of the tile was intended suggest natural elements at what is a very urban and busy intersection. The shape of the building looks like an abstract spruce tree. The clock tower was mandated as part of the development agreement and has 6-foot long clock arms. The family logo for Marie and Harold Slawik was a spruce tree. Marie was surprised at the amount of green on the building and despite wishing the building appeared less green, thought the building was beautiful.

Reception of the architectural design of the building has been mixed with the unique look and design often highlighted. The building has been described as having "grotesque green architecture" and Reuters described the building as the 4th ugliest in the world in 2011. A Chicago Tribune columnist described it as a 1980s version of the Emerald City that "almost forces residents to look at it". Star Tribune readers identified it as the 7th ugliest building in the Twin Cities in 2000. One reader commented that it "personified bad taste" and looked "like a tawdry example of what a bus station's tiled restroom would look like." Others have described it as "spectacularly, ambitiously ugly". Architectural critic Larry Millett described mixed feelings about the design but suggested the building deserved respect for making a statement and having the most architectural presence of buildings at the Snelling and University Avenue intersections.
