= Hamline-Midway, Saint Paul =

Neighborhood and city planning district in Saint Paul, Minnesota, USA

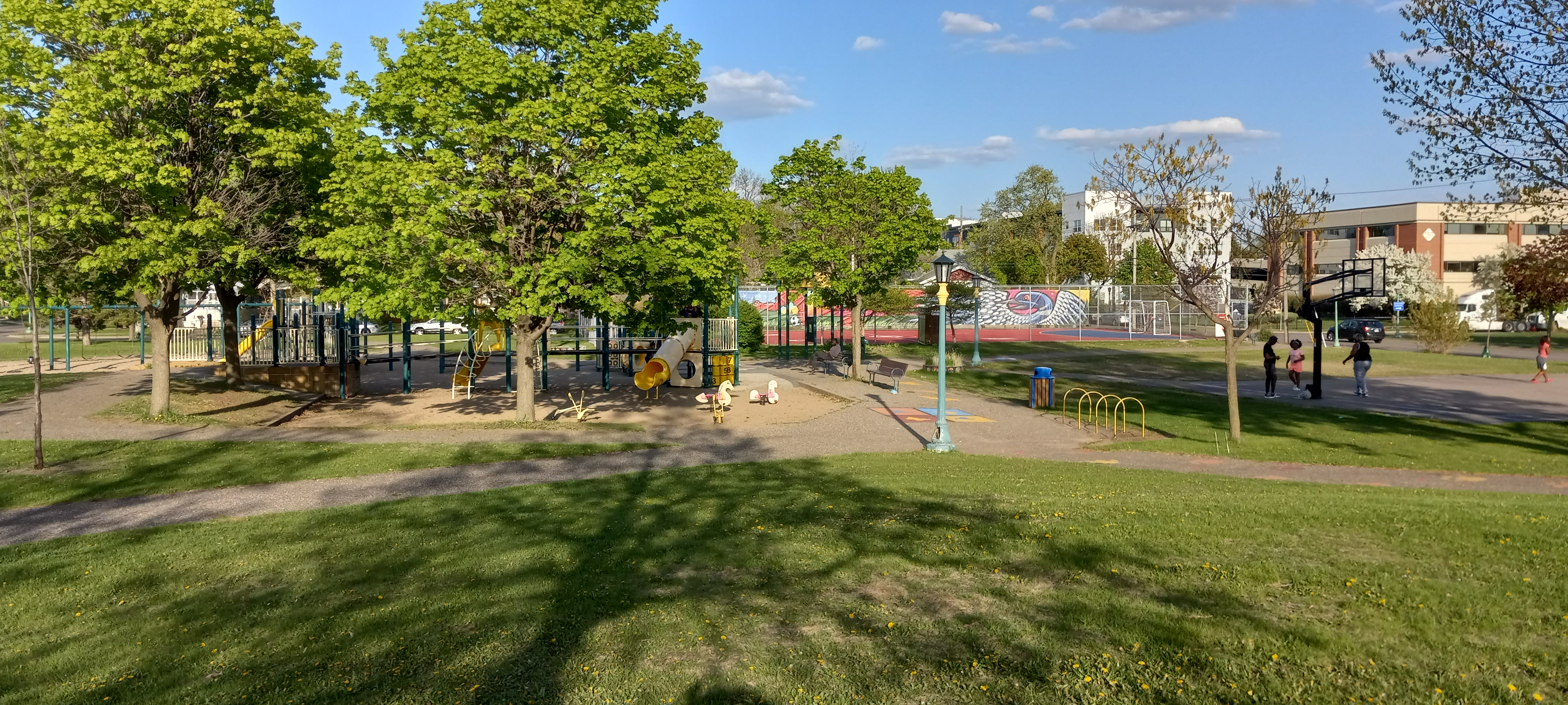
The playground in Hamline Park

Hamline-Midway, or just Midway, is a neighborhood and city planning district in Saint Paul, Minnesota, in the United States. It is Planning District 11. The neighborhood is bounded on the west by the trajectory of Cleveland Ave (the Avenue itself is absent between University and Como Avenues), on the south by University Avenue, on the east by Lexington Parkway on the east, and on the north by the main line of BNSF Railway railroad tracks. The unofficial boundaries are more loosely defined, however, and the term "Midway" is applied throughout this part of Saint Paul, often well beyond the actual location of the district. The 'Midway' name comes from being midway between downtown Minneapolis and downtown Saint Paul.

The area is largely flat with a grid of streets. Historically a working class neighborhood with mostly white residents, the area has seen significant change since 1990s with new residents of color and the growth of immigrant businesses. New growth and the addition of Minnesota United FC's stadium, Allianz Field, have led to concerns about the threat of gentrification.

Hamline-Midway includes many landmarks, such as Hamline University, Allianz Field (technically outside of the original bounds of the neighborhood), Ax-Man Surplus, and the Turf Club. Snelling Avenue provides a major transportation route and commercial corridor in the center of the neighborhood. The Green Line light rail runs along the southern edge.

== History ==
Settlers first started living in Hamline-Midway in the 1850s. Hamline University moved to the area in 1880. A portion of the neighborhood closer to Hamline University, sometimes called Hamline Village, is older and developed at a different time than the rest of the neighborhood. The area began developing faster when streetcar service on University Avenue reached the neighborhood in 1890. Most of the housing stock is from 1900-1930.

Railroads have heavily shaped the neighborhood with the first railroad, the Minnesota Transfer Railway, moving to near the western end of the neighborhood in 1883. Railroads were present on the northern border of the neighborhood as well with the Great Northern and Pacific Northern tracks, both now part of BNSF. Some industry on the northern border gradually moved out allowing the area to redevelop as Energy Park including the historic Northern Pacific Como Shops which have become Bandana Square. During the 1960s many companies located in the industrial western edge of the neighborhood near the railroads move to the suburbs leaving behind vacant warehouses.

The neighborhood transitioned from mostly streetcars to a high level of automobile use in the 1930s and 1940s, especially along University Avenue. By the 1970s, the neighborhood had seen a decline with buildings first built due to the streetcars in the 1900s in deteriorating condition. The Star Tribune described the neighborhood as being on the upswing in the late 1980s with major shopping center renovations and the construction of the Spruce Tree Centre at the intersection of University and Snelling Avenues.

The neighborhood along with the city of Saint Paul saw significant growth in its minority population from 1990 to 2000. Changes to the neighborhood that have happened since 2000 have led to some being concerned about gentrification. The Green Line opened in 2014 along the southern boundary of the neighborhood on University Avenue. A bus rapid transit line, the Metro A Line, opened in 2016 along Snelling Avenue. Allianz Field opened in 2019 on the site of a former bus garage and the Midway Shopping Center. The site is technically in the Union Park, Saint Paul neighborhood but the stadium is commonly referred to as being in the Midway neighborhood. Redevelopment of the area surrounding the stadium has been slow since opening.

In October 2024, the Twin Cities Pioneer Press reported the Saint Paul City Council recently approved $3.3 million to support the expansion of Kimball Court from 76 beds to 98 beds, and in November 2024, CBS News reported that Saint Paul – Hamline Midway neighborhood has faced growing concerns regarding a rise in crime, particularly related to drug use and mental health issues, with Kimball Court Apartments being a focal point. Kimball Court is a low-income housing complex that accommodates many tenants, some of whom are dealing with challenges such as sobriety and transitioning out of homelessness.

Since 2025, the neighborhood has hosted a cat tour, inspired by one in The Wedge, Minneapolis.
