= Snelling & St. Clair station =

Bus station in Saint Paul, Minnesota, United States

Snelling & St. Clair

General information
- Coordinates: 44°56′3.81″N 93°10′1.18″W
- Owner: Metro Transit
- Line: A Line
- Platforms: Side platforms

Construction
- Structure type: Small shelter
- Parking: No
- Cycle facilities: Yes
- Accessible: Yes

Other information
- Station code: 17318 (southbound); 56116 (northbound)

History
- Opened: June 11, 2016

Passengers
- 2025: 106 daily
- Rank: 92 out of 129

Services
Preceding station	Metro	Following station
Snelling & Randolph toward 46th Street	A Line	Snelling & Grand toward Rosedale
Location

Snelling & St. Clair is a bus rapid transit station on the Metro A Line in Saint Paul, Minnesota.

The station is located at the intersection of St. Clair Avenue on Snelling Avenue. Both station platforms are located north of St. Clair Avenue.

The station opened June 11, 2016 with the rest of the A Line.

== Notable places nearby ==
- Macalester College
- Macalester-Groveland, Saint Paul
