= Snelling & Dayton station =

Bus station in Saint Paul, Minnesota, United States

Snelling & Dayton
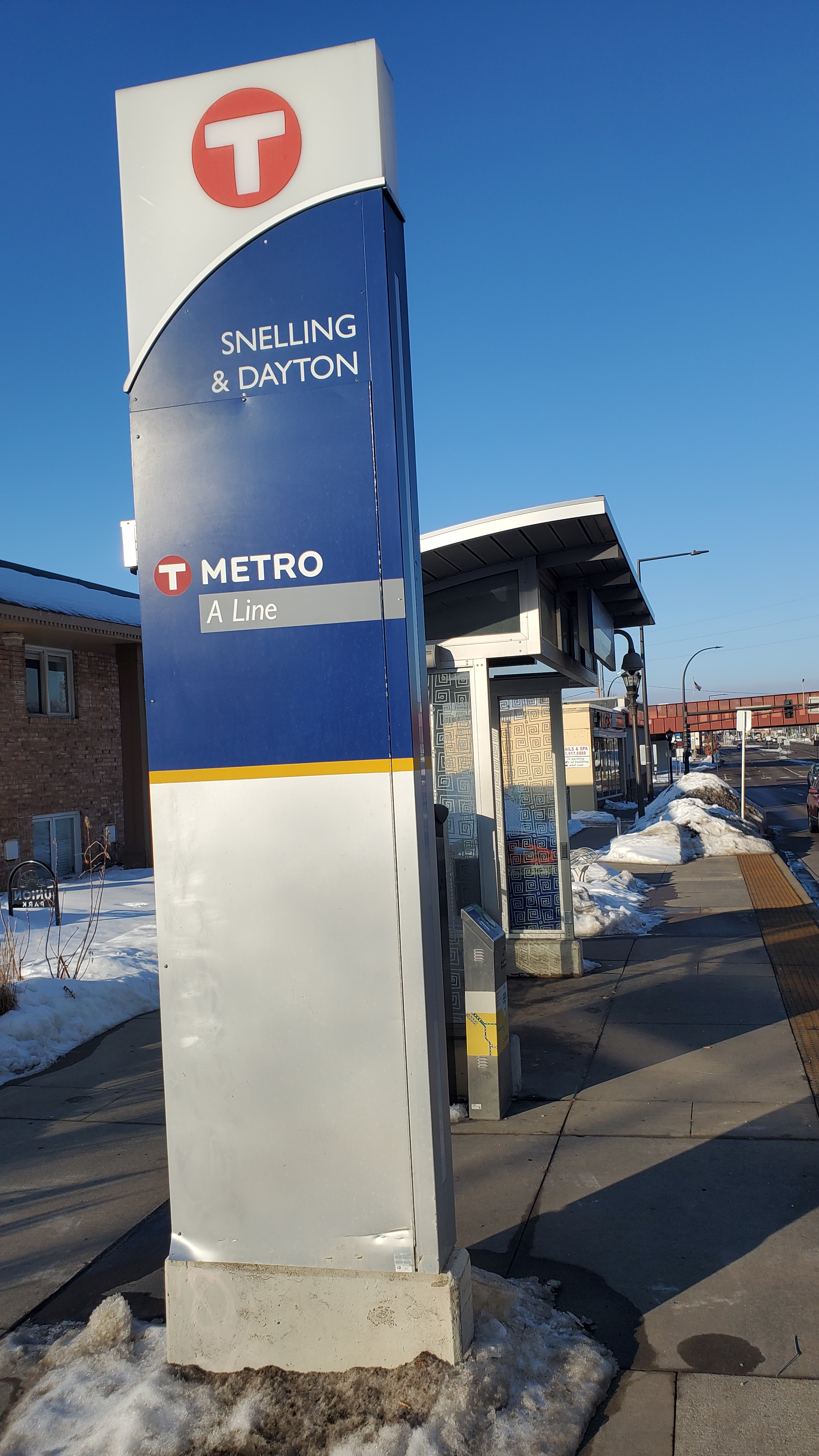
- The southbound station in 2023

General information
- Coordinates: 44°56′50.62″N 93°10′1.18″W
- Owner: Metro Transit
- Lines: A Line; B Line
- Platforms: 2 split side platforms

Construction
- Structure type: Small shelter
- Parking: No
- Cycle facilities: Yes
- Accessible: Yes

Other information
- Station code: 17307 (southbound); 17371 (northbound)

History
- Opened: June 11, 2016

Passengers
- 2025: 854 daily
- Rank: 10 out of 129

Services
Preceding station	Metro	Following station
Snelling & Grand toward 46th Street	A Line	Snelling & University toward Rosedale
Marshall & Fairview toward Lake & France	B Line	Selby & Hamline toward Saint Paul Union Depot
Location

Snelling & Dayton is a bus rapid transit station on the Metro A Line and B Line in Saint Paul, Minnesota.

The station is located at the intersection of Dayton Avenue on Snelling Avenue, just south of Marshall Avenue. Both station platforms are located near-side of Dayton Avenue. The station opened June 11, 2016 with the rest of the A Line. The B Line started service here upon opening on June 14, 2025.

== Places nearby ==
- Union Park, Saint Paul
- Carbucks
