= Snelling & Larpenteur station =

Bus station in Falcon Heights, Minnesota, United States

Snelling & Larpenteur

General information
- Coordinates: 44°59′30″N 93°10′0″W
- Owner: Metro Transit
- Line: A Line
- Platforms: 2
- Connections: 61

Construction
- Structure type: Medium shelter
- Parking: No
- Accessible: Yes

History
- Opened: June 11, 2016

Passengers
- 2025: 170 daily
- Rank: 72 out of 129

Services
Preceding station	Metro	Following station
Snelling & Hoyt-Nebraska toward 46th Street	A Line	Snelling & County Road B toward Rosedale
Location

Snelling & Larpenteur is a bus rapid transit station on the A Line in Falcon Heights, Minnesota, United States. The station is located at the intersection of Larpenteur Avenue on Snelling Avenue. Both station platforms are located far-side of Larpenteur Avenue. The station opened June 11, 2016 with the rest of the A Line.

== Bus connections ==
Connections to local bus Route 61 can be made on Larpenteur Avenue. Route 84, predecessor to the A Line, stopped at the station until December 1, 2018.

== Notable places nearby ==
- Minnesota State Fair
