= Snelling & Como station =

Bus stop in Saint Paul, Minnesota, United States

Snelling & Como
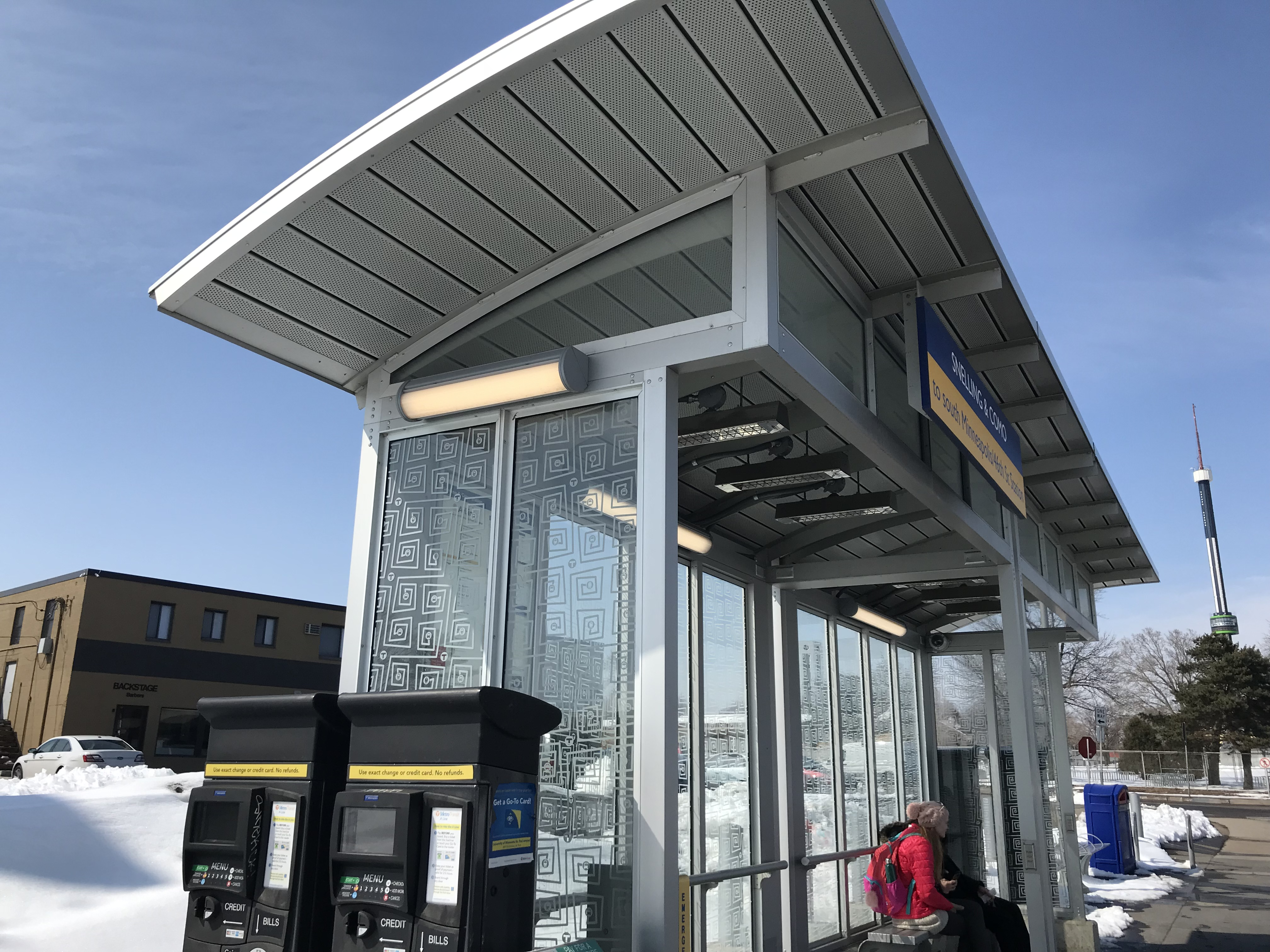

General information
- Coordinates: 44°58′38″N 93°10′2″W
- Owner: Metro Transit
- Line: A Line
- Connections: 3

Construction
- Structure type: Medium shelter
- Parking: No
- Cycle facilities: Yes
- Accessible: Yes

History
- Opened: June 11, 2016

Passengers
- 2025: 214 daily
- Rank: 54 out of 129

Services
Preceding station	Metro	Following station
Snelling & Hewitt toward 46th Street	A Line	Snelling & Hoyt-Nebraska toward Rosedale
Location

Snelling & Como is a bus rapid transit station on the A Line in Saint Paul, Minnesota, United States. The station is located at the intersection of Como Avenue and the off-ramps for Snelling Avenue (Minnesota State Highway 51). Both station platforms are located far-side of Como Avenue. The station opened June 11, 2016 with the rest of the A Line.

== Bus connections ==
- Route 3 - U of M - Como Av - Energy Park Dr - Maryland Av

Connections to local bus Route 3 can be made on Como Avenue under the Minnesota State Highway 51 overpass. Southbound Route 3B trips share platforms with the A Line.

== Notable places nearby ==
- Minnesota State Fair
- Como neighborhood, Saint Paul
