= Snelling & Randolph station =

Bus stop in Saint Paul, Minnesota, United States

Snelling & Randolph

General information
- Coordinates: 44°55′37.16″N 93°10′1.18″W
- Owner: Metro Transit
- Line: A Line
- Platforms: Side platforms
- Connections: 74

Construction
- Structure type: Small shelter (southbound); Medium shelter (northbound)
- Parking: No
- Cycle facilities: Yes
- Accessible: Yes

Other information
- Station code: 56123 (southbound); 56115 (northbound)

History
- Opened: June 11, 2016

Passengers
- 2025: 227 daily
- Rank: 51 out of 129

Services
Preceding station	Metro	Following station
Snelling & Highland toward 46th Street	A Line	Snelling & St. Clair toward Rosedale
Location

Snelling & Randolph is a bus rapid transit station on the Metro A Line in Saint Paul, Minnesota.

The station is located at the intersection of Randolph Avenue on Snelling Avenue. Both station platforms are located far-side of Randolph Avenue.

The station opened June 11, 2016 with the rest of the A Line.

== Bus connections ==
- Route 74 - 46th Street Station - Randolph Avenue - West 7th Street - East 7th Street - Sunray Transit Center

Connections to local bus Route 74 can be made on Randolph Avenue.

== Notable places nearby ==
- Highland Park, Saint Paul
- Macalester-Groveland, Saint Paul
