= Snelling & Grand station =

Bus station in Saint Paul, Minnesota, United States

Snelling & Grand
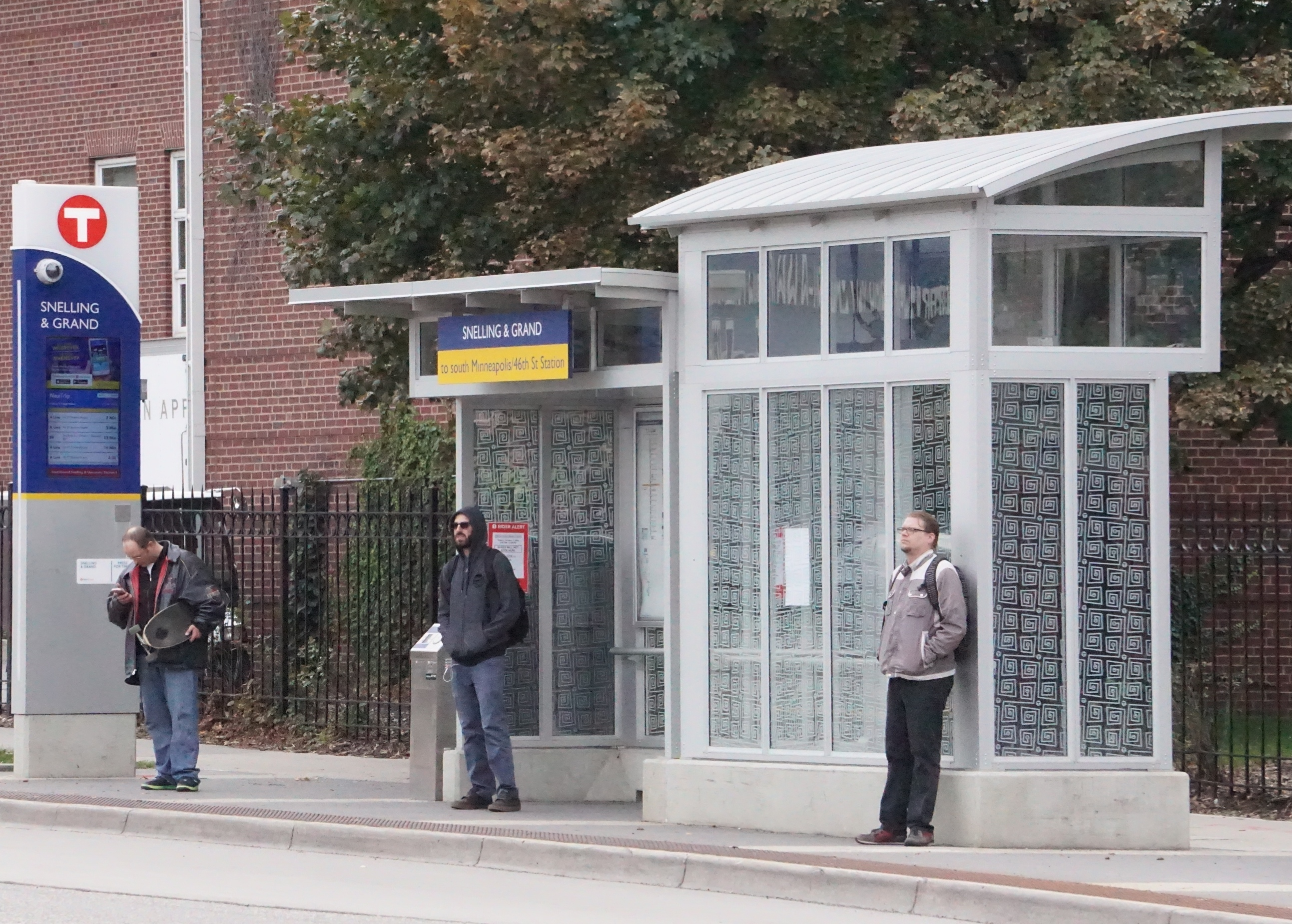
- Passengers waiting at the southbound station.

General information
- Coordinates: 44°57′46.51″N 93°10′1.41″W
- Owner: Metro Transit
- Line: A Line
- Platforms: Side platforms
- Connections: 63

Construction
- Structure type: Medium shelter (southbound); Small shelter (northbound)
- Parking: No
- Cycle facilities: Yes
- Accessible: Yes

Other information
- Station code: 17312 (southbound); 17366 (northbound)

History
- Opened: June 11, 2016

Passengers
- 2025: 296 daily
- Rank: 41 out of 129

Services
Preceding station	Metro	Following station
Snelling & St. Clair toward 46th Street	A Line	Snelling & Dayton toward Rosedale
Location

Snelling & Grand is a bus rapid transit station on the Metro A Line in Saint Paul, Minnesota.

The station is located at the intersection of Grand Avenue on Snelling Avenue, one block south of Summit Avenue. Both station platforms are located south of Grand Avenue.

The station opened June 11, 2016, with the rest of the A Line.

== Bus connections ==
- Route 63 – Raymond Station – Grand Avenue – Sunray Transit Center

Connections to local bus Route 63 can be made on Grand Avenue.

== Places nearby ==
- Macalester College
- Macalester-Groveland, Saint Paul
