= Snelling & County Road B station =

Bus station in Roseville, Minnesota, United States

Snelling & County Road B

General information
- Coordinates: 45°0′19.08″N 93°9′59.04″W
- Owner: Metro Transit
- Line: A Line
- Connections: 65,83

Construction
- Structure type: Medium shelter
- Parking: No
- Accessible: Yes

History
- Opened: June 11, 2016

Passengers
- 2025: 314 daily
- Rank: 37 out of 129

Services
Preceding station	Metro	Following station
Snelling & Larpenteur toward 46th Street	A Line	Rosedale Terminus
Location

Snelling & County Road B is a bus rapid transit station on the A Line in Roseville, Minnesota.

The station is located at the intersection of County Road B with Snelling Avenue. The southbound station platform is southwest of County Road B, while the northbound station platform is located between County Road B and the entrance road to Har Mar Mall. Buses approaching the station will announce "This stop for Har Mar Mall."

The station opened June 11, 2016 with the rest of the A Line.

== Bus connections ==
Connections to local bus routes 65 and 83 can be made on County Road B. Route 84, predecessor to the A Line, stopped at the station until December 1, 2018.

== Notable places nearby ==
- Har Mar Mall
- Ramsey County Library Roseville
