= Snelling & Minnehaha station =

Bus station in Saint Paul, Minnesota, United States

Snelling & Minnehaha

General information
- Coordinates: 44°57′46.51″N 93°10′1.41″W
- Owner: Metro Transit
- Line: A Line
- Platforms: 2 split side platforms
- Connections: 67

Construction
- Structure type: Medium shelter (southbound); Small shelter (northbound)
- Parking: No
- Cycle facilities: Yes
- Accessible: Yes

Other information
- Station code: 15116 (southbound); 56118 (northbound)

History
- Opened: June 11, 2016

Passengers
- 2025: 194 daily
- Rank: 59 out of 129

Services
Preceding station	Metro	Following station
Snelling & University toward 46th Street	A Line	Snelling & Hewitt toward Rosedale
Location

Snelling & Minnehaha is a bus rapid transit station on the Metro A Line in Saint Paul, Minnesota.

The station is located at the intersection of Minnehaha Avenue on Snelling Avenue. Both station platforms are located far-side of Minnehaha Avenue.

The station opened June 11, 2016 with the rest of the A Line.

== Bus connections ==
- Route 67 - Minnehaha Avenue - Raymond Station - Franklin Avenue

Connections to local bus Route 67 can be made on Minnehaha Avenue.

== Notable places nearby ==
- Hamline-Midway, Saint Paul
