= Snelling & Hewitt station =

Bus station in Saint Paul, Minnesota, United States

Snelling & Hewitt
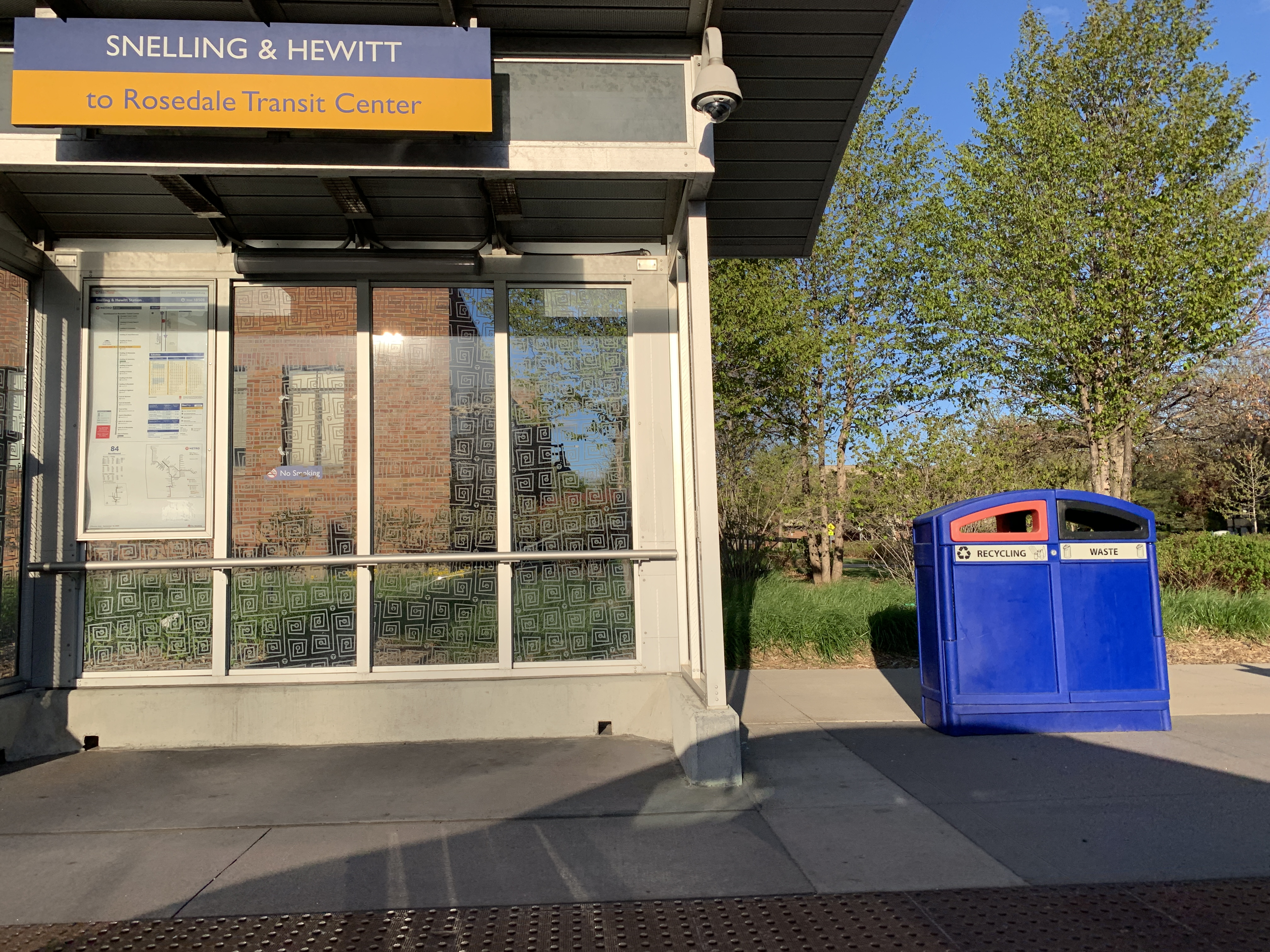

General information
- Coordinates: 44°10′0.17″N 93°58′1.34″W
- Owner: Metro Transit
- Line: A Line
- Platforms: 2 split side platforms

Construction
- Structure type: Medium shelter (southbound); Small shelter (northbound)
- Parking: No
- Cycle facilities: Yes
- Accessible: Yes

Other information
- Station code: 15114 (southbound); 18508 (northbound)

History
- Opened: June 11, 2016

Passengers
- 2025: 102 daily
- Rank: 95 out of 129

Services
Preceding station	Metro	Following station
Snelling & Minnehaha toward 46th Street	A Line	Snelling & Como toward Rosedale
Location

Snelling & Hewitt is a bus rapid transit station on the Metro A Line in Saint Paul, Minnesota.

The station is located at the intersection of Hewitt Avenue on Snelling Avenue. Both station platforms are located far-side of Hewitt Avenue.

The station opened June 11, 2016 with the rest of the A Line.

== Bus connections ==
This station does not have any bus connections.

== Notable places nearby ==
- Hamline University
- Hamline-Midway, Saint Paul
