= Snelling & Hoyt-Nebraska station =

Bus station in Saint Paul, Minnesota, United States

Snelling & Hoyt-Nebraska

General information
- Coordinates: 44°59′13.02″N 93°10′1.02″W
- Owner: Metro Transit
- Line: A Line

Construction
- Structure type: Small shelter
- Parking: No
- Cycle facilities: Yes
- Accessible: Yes

History
- Opened: June 11, 2016

Passengers
- 2025: 43 daily
- Rank: 120 out of 129

Services
Preceding station	Metro	Following station
Snelling & Como toward 46th Street	A Line	Snelling & Larpenteur toward Rosedale
Location

Snelling & Hoyt and Snelling & Nebraska are a pair of bus rapid transit stations on the A Line in Falcon Heights and Saint Paul, Minnesota. The two stations collectively make up one station, Snelling & Hoyt-Nebraska.

The southbound station, Snelling & Hoyt, is located south of Hoyt Avenue on Snelling Avenue. The northbound station, Snelling & Nebraska, is located south of Nebraska Avenue on Snelling Avenue. The station is split due to right-of-way restrictions on the west side of Snelling Avenue at Nebraska Avenue.

The station opened June 11, 2016 with the rest of the A Line.

== Bus connections ==
This station does not have any bus connections. Route 84, predecessor to the A Line, stopped only at Snelling & Nebraska until December 1, 2018.

== Notable places nearby ==
- Minnesota State Fair
- Hubert H. Humphrey Job Corps Center
- Como neighborhood, Saint Paul
