= Union Park =

Union Park may refer to

- Union Park (Baltimore), a former baseball ground in Baltimore, Maryland
- Union Park, Florida, a census-designated place in Orange County, Florida
- Union Park (Chicago), a municipal park in Chicago, Illinois
- Union Park, Mauritius, a village in the Grand Port District
- Union Park, Saint Paul, a neighborhood in Saint Paul, Minnesota
- Recreation Park (Pittsburgh), formerly known as Union Park, a stadium in Allegheny City, Pennsylvania
- Dartmouth Grounds, also known as Union Park, a 19th-century baseball ground in Boston, Massachusetts
- Symphony Park, originally known as Union Park, a mixed-use urban community in Las Vegas, Nevada
