= Snelling Avenue station =

Light rail and bus rapid transit station in Saint Paul, Minnesota

Snelling Avenue Snelling & University
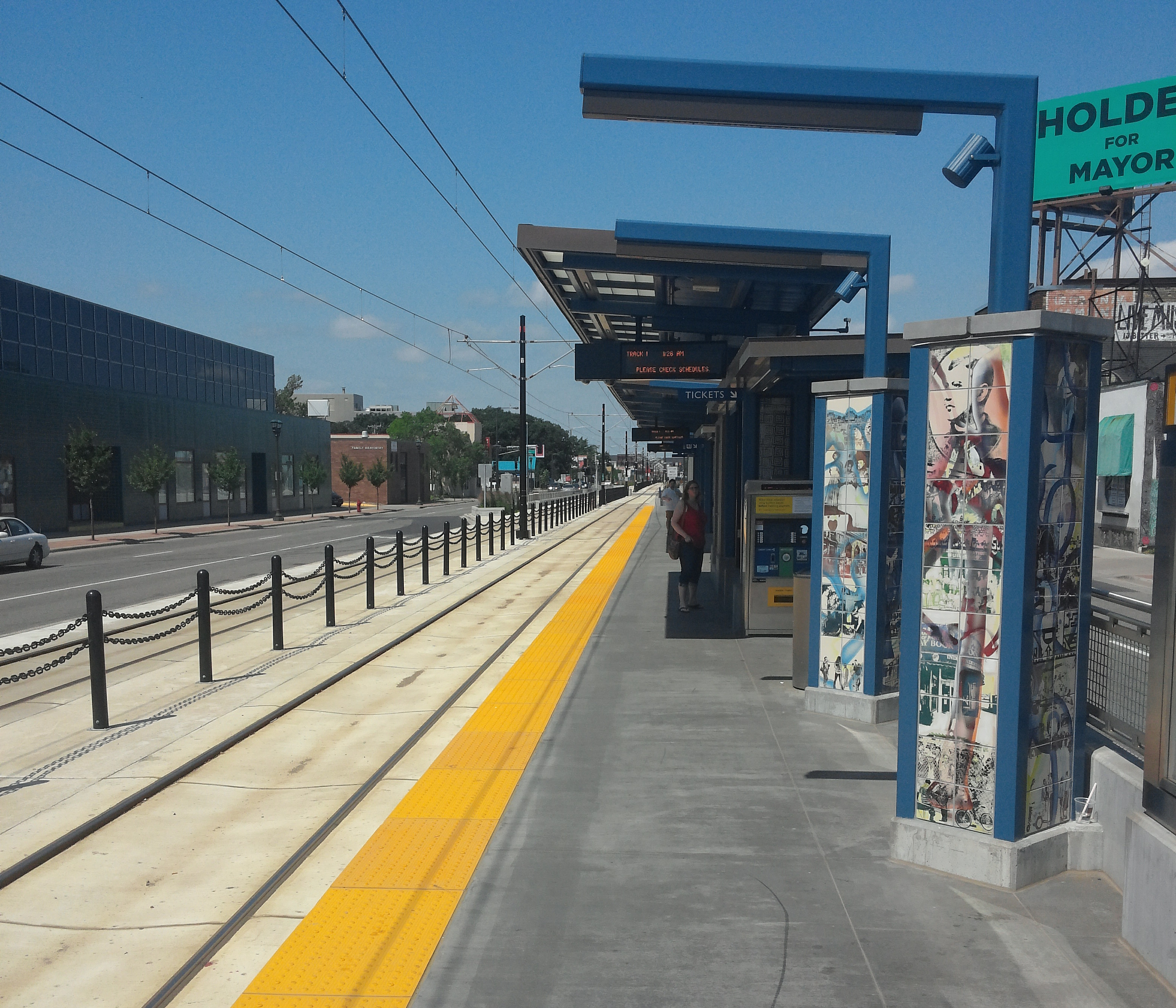
- Snelling Avenue station platform in 2014

General information
- Location: 1572 University Avenue West (Eastbound); 1595 University Avenue West (Westbound); Saint Paul, Minnesota
- Coordinates: 44°57′20″N 93°10′01″W
- Owner: Metro Transit
- Platforms: 2 split side platforms
- Tracks: 2

Construction
- Structure type: At-grade
- Cycle facilities: Nice Ride station
- Accessible: Yes

History
- Opened: June 14, 2014
- Rebuilt: 2016

Passengers
- 2025: 1,342 daily ▼25.9% (LRT)
- Rank: 11 out of 37
- 2025: 728 daily (BRT)
- Rank: 12 out of 129

Services
Preceding station	Metro	Following station
Fairview Avenue toward Target Field	Green Line	Hamline Avenue toward Saint Paul Union Depot
Snelling & Dayton toward 46th Street	A Line	Snelling & Minnehaha toward Rosedale
Location

Snelling Avenue station is a light rail station along the Metro Green Line in Saint Paul, Minnesota. It is located along University Avenue on either side of the intersection with Snelling Avenue. The station has split side platforms, with the westbound platform on the north side of the tracks west of Snelling and the eastbound platform on the south side of the tracks east of the intersection.

This station serves the Snelling and University Avenues intersection. The Minnesota Department of Transportation counts 48,550 average daily motor vehicle volume, which is not in the 25 most-trafficked intersections in Minnesota. But urban historian Larry Millett calculated around 64,000 daily cars; he believes that Snelling and University is the busiest in the state.

Construction in this area began in 2011. The station opened along with the rest of the line in 2014.

Allianz Field opened in 2019 on the southeast corner of University and Snelling Avenues. The Snelling Avenue light rail station serves the new soccer stadium. The Spruce Tree Centre building visually towers over the intersection. Other notable features near the station include Ax-Man Surplus and the Turf Club.

== Snelling & University station ==
Snelling & University station is the name for the bus rapid transit station on the Metro A Line. Both station platforms are located south of University Avenue, providing convenient connections to the Green Line. The station midway between its route from 46th Street and Rosedale Transit Center. The station opened June 11, 2016 with the rest of the A Line. On system maps, the light rail station and rapid bus station are known collectively as just Snelling Avenue Station.
