= Turf Club (Saint Paul) =

Venue in St. Paul, Minnesota

Coordinates: 44°57′21″N 93°10′4″W

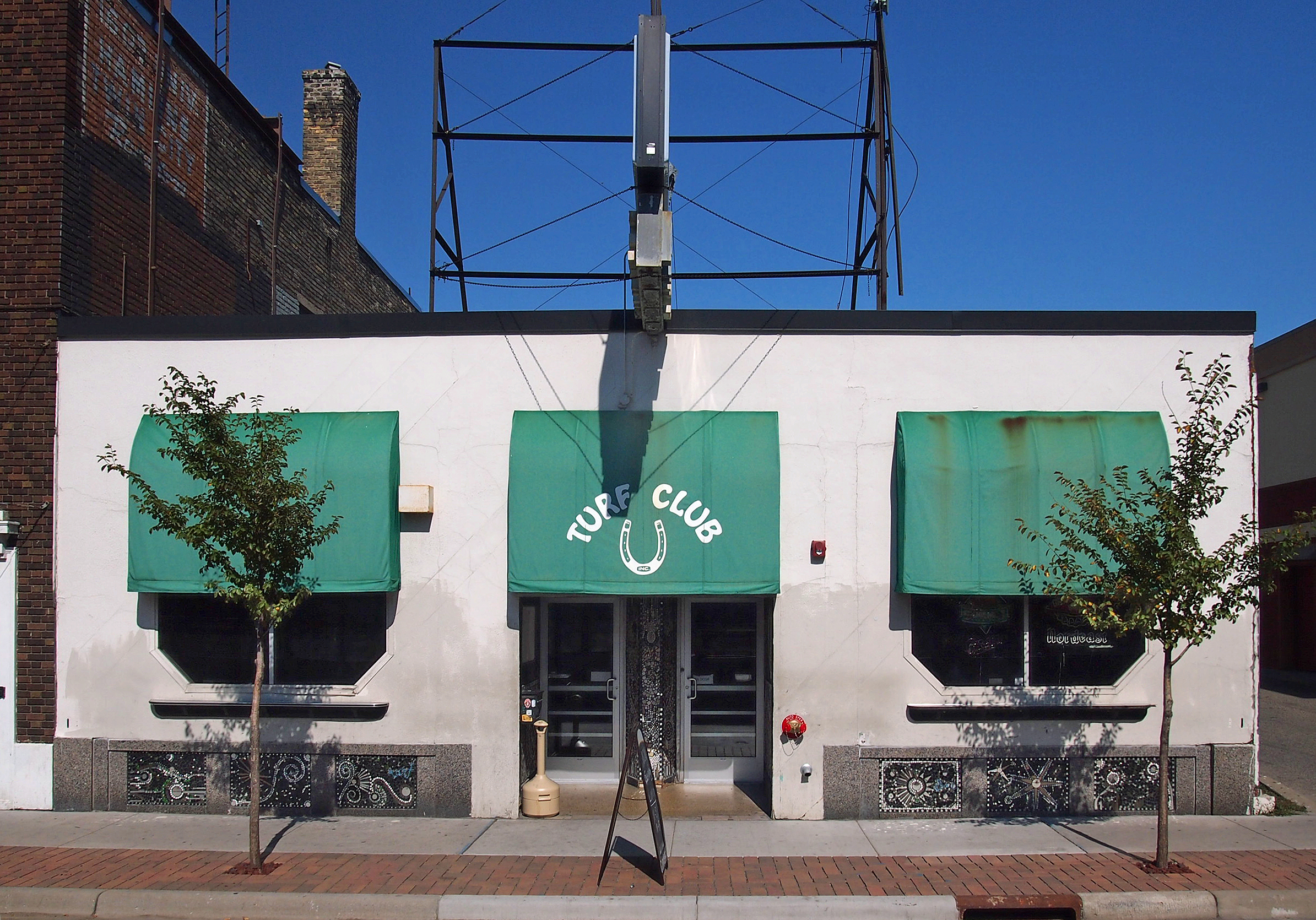
- Interactive map of Turf Club
- Address: 1601 University Avenue West
- Location: Saint Paul, Minnesota
- Capacity: 350
- Type: Nightclub/tavern

Construction
- Opened: 1940s

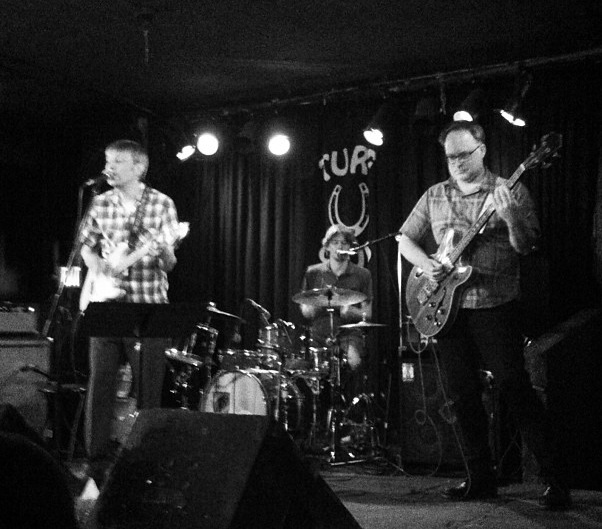
The Hang Ups performing at the Turf Club in 2013

The Turf Club is a bar, restaurant and music venue in Saint Paul, Minnesota, United States.

== History ==
Originally a dance hall in the 1940s, the Turf Club has since the 1990s been popular with Twin Cities bands, a sharp contrast to previous years when most local bands only played Minneapolis venues. The club has also become an important venue for national and international touring acts. Japanese indie-rock band Shonen Knife played its 1,000th show at the Turf Club.

The Turf Club was sold to the owners of First Avenue in late 2013. The venue has a capacity of about 350. The club's basement hosts a smaller bar and performance space, the Clown Lounge, which is used for jazz gigs. The Turf Club is located on the north side of University Avenue near Snelling Avenue and across the street from the Snelling Avenue light rail station on the Green Line. In 2014, the club received a substantial remodel, including an upgraded sound system and the return of a mural featuring five racehorses which had been forgotten, hidden behind curtains, for decades.

The building was closed for more than a year in 2020-2021 due to the COVID-19 pandemic, and also incurred fire and water damage during the civil unrest of the George Floyd protests in 2020, requiring months of repair. The Turf Club reopened for concerts in July 2021.
