= Allianz Field =

Soccer stadium in St. Paul, Minnesota, United States

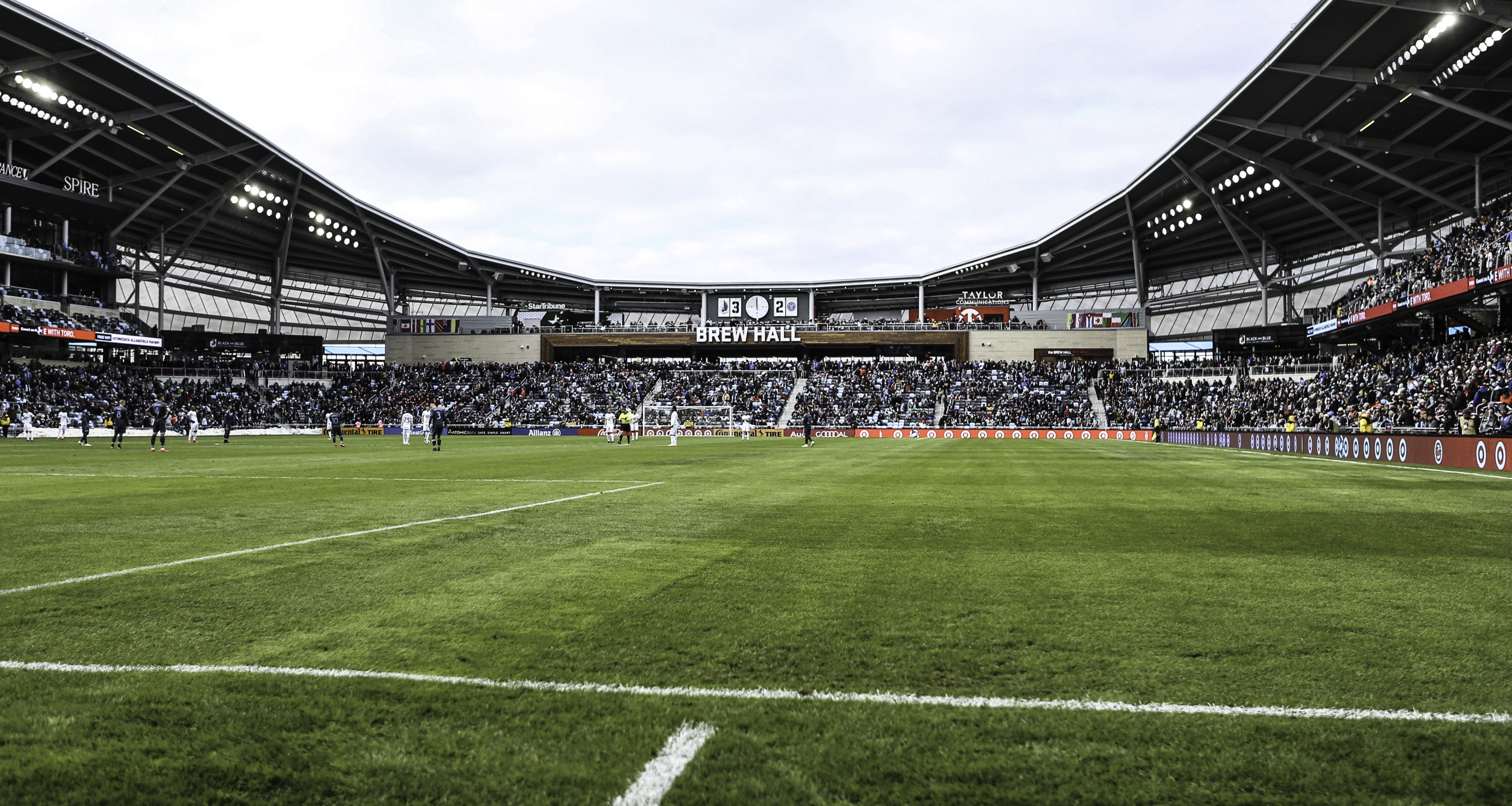
- Allianz Field on inauguration day in April 2019

- Location in Minnesota Location in the United States
- Address: 400 Snelling Avenue North
- Location: Saint Paul, Minnesota, U.S.
- Coordinates: 44°57′11.2″N 93°09′53.0″W
- Owner: Minnesota United FC
- Capacity: 19,400
- Surface: Grass
- Public transit: Green Line; A Line at Snelling Avenue

Construction
- Groundbreaking: December 12, 2016
- Opened: April 13, 2019
- Cost: $200 million
- Architect: Populous
- Structural engineer: Walter P Moore
- Services engineers: M–E Engineers, Inc.
- General contractor: Mortenson Construction

Tenants
- Minnesota United FC (MLS) (2019–present); Minnesota United FC 2 (MLSNP) (2022–present)

Allianz Field is a soccer-specific stadium in Saint Paul, Minnesota, United States, located near Interstate 94 and Snelling Avenue. It is home to Minnesota United FC of Major League Soccer (MLS). It opened in 2019 during the club's third season, and has a capacity of 19,400 spectators.

On October 23, 2015, team owners announced that Minnesota United would build a stadium on the 35-acre (14 ha) Saint Paul bus barn site. The stadium seats approximately 19,400, was completed in early 2019, and was privately financed for $200 million.

On November 25, 2015, Minnesota United FC hired Kansas City-based Populous to design the stadium. On December 9, 2015, the team hired Mortenson Construction as part of the stadium construction along with Populous. Mortenson built U.S. Bank Stadium for the Minnesota Vikings in 2014–2016, and worked with Populous on three other Twin Cities sports facilities: Target Field, Huntington Bank Stadium, and Grand Casino Arena. Construction was completed in February 2019, and the stadium opened two months later on April 13, 2019, with Minnesota United FC hosting New York City FC.

In North American competitions, the stadium is known as Saint Paul Stadium due to advertising rules.

== Location and transportation ==
Allianz Field is located on the north side of Interstate 94 between Snelling Avenue and Pascal Street in the Midway neighborhood of Saint Paul, Minnesota. The neighborhood is named for being midway between Downtown Minneapolis and Downtown Saint Paul. The stadium is located on several major transit routes, including the Snelling Avenue light rail station on the Metro Green Line and a set of stops served by the A Line bus rapid transit route. The venue has fewer than 1,000 spaces of on-site parking, instead relying on public transit and off-site lots with shuttle buses. Minnesota United has also organized several designated areas for vehicle for hire pickups and dropoffs, as well as 400 parking spaces for bicycles. The city government of Saint Paul projects that 38 percent of match attendees will use public transit, while 23 percent will use off-site parking lots with shuttles, and 11 percent will use private parking closer to the stadium.

== Design ==
Allianz Field is a ring-shaped stadium, with seating for approximately 19,400 in the first phase and 24,474 in a future expansion that would fill the four corners. It has a safe standing terrace for 2,920 supporters, named the "Wonderwall" after the club's unofficial anthem, located behind the south-end goal. The single-tier Wonderwall terrace was designed with a 34.9 percent incline and has no seats. The north end has a brewpub, named Brew Hall, and a manual scoreboard and 90-minute clock that were designed to resemble fixtures at the former home, National Sports Center in Blaine.

The stadium was designed by Populous with deliberate sightlines and an "intimate atmosphere" in mind. The pitch sits 16 inches (41 cm) above the first row of seats and is composed of 97,000 square feet (9,000 m^{2}) of turf from Heath Farms in Wisconsin, installed in October 2019 to replace the original Kentucky bluegrass from Colorado that suffered from drainage issues. A glass-like polymer mesh oval exterior provides the stadium with a sleek facade. It is clad in PTFE, which covers the steel structure that holds the roof in place. With an overhang partially covering the field, the facade is expected to soften the noise towards the neighborhood. Color-changing LEDs light the exterior mesh in the same manner as Allianz Arena in Munich, Germany and MetLife Stadium in East Rutherford, New Jersey. The first tests of the lighting system in December 2018, which ran overnight in the fog, drew complaints from neighboring residents due to the intensity of the colors.

=== Green space ===
The masterplan is pedestrian-oriented and designates 2.6 acres (1.1 ha) of outdoor gathering spaces. The stadium will be ringed by three grassy plazas and a fourth green space will be placed along University Avenue, near Snelling Avenue Station. Pascal Green will be on the east of the stadium; United Champion Plaza will be on the southwest corner; Victory Plaza will be on the north; and Midway Square will be north of Victory Plaza, along Snelling Avenue. Midway Square and Victory Plaza will express the north-south axis of the stadium.

These green spaces are planned to be progressively introduced in phases as property owner RK Midway waits for existing leases on its current tenants to end. However, the timeline of these phases has not been released to the city or the public, as of July 2016. The project drew criticism as the full realization of the masterplan could take many years.

== History ==
=== Site ===
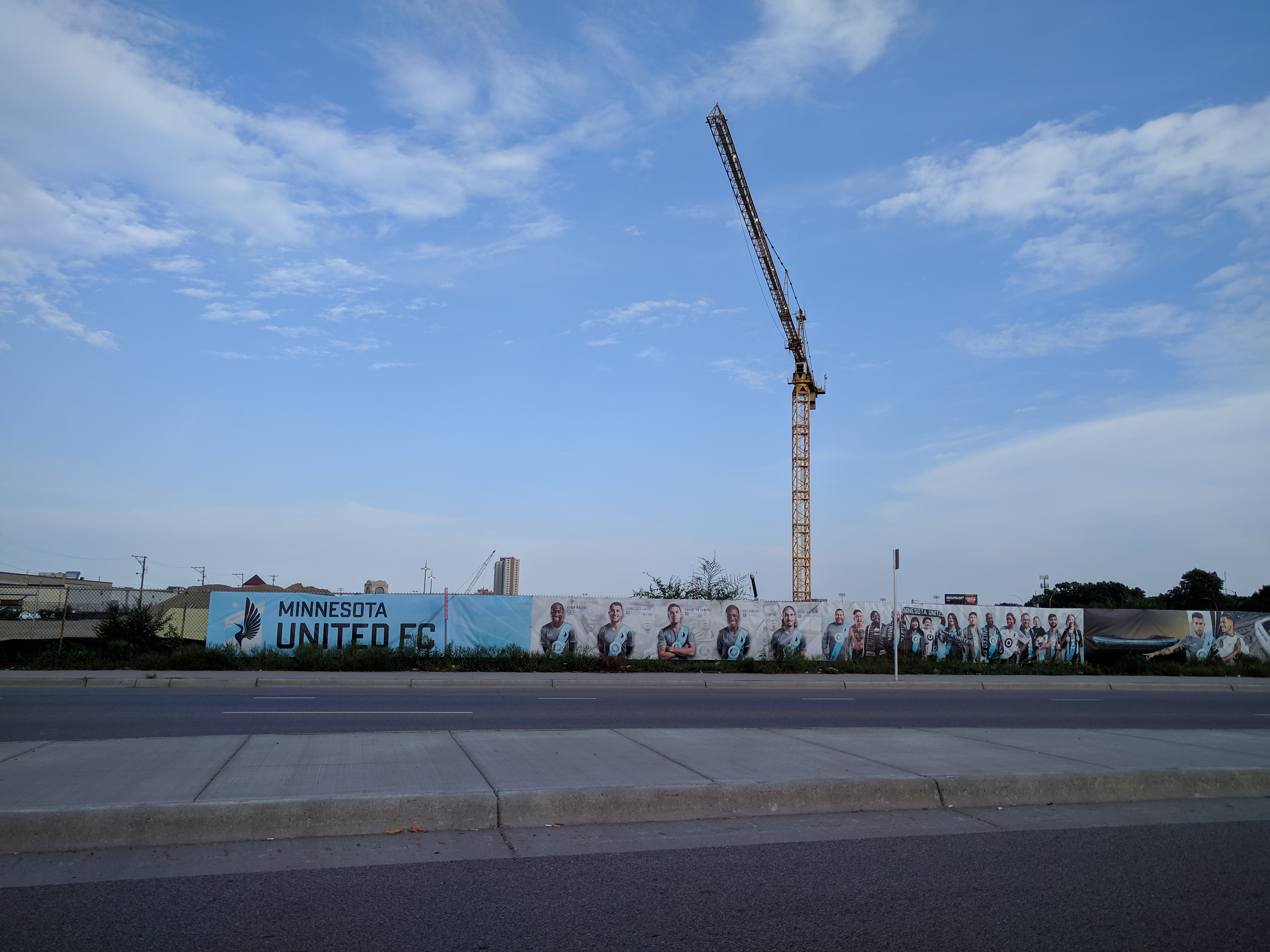
Construction as of September 2017

A masterplan has been drawn up for the redevelopment of the broad area, including the stadium site and adjacent properties owned by RK Midway. This may include building new hotel and office space and the redevelopment of the existing shopping center. The buildings occupied by Rainbow supermarket, Walgreens, Midway Pro Bowl and some adjoining spaces will be torn down. The masterplan calls for the redevelopment to be more pedestrian friendly, to accommodate large numbers of fans walking to and from the transit stations.

The southern half of the site was formerly a bus barn used by Metro Transit until it was demolished in 2002. Later a big-box store was pursued for the site but not built. The site was acquired decades earlier by the Metropolitan Council with help from the Federal Transit Administration so development of the site required federal government approval. The property had been the Snelling Shops, where streetcars were built and maintained for the Twin City Rapid Transit Company. The stadium itself primarily sits on this property.

=== Naming rights ===
On July 25, 2017, Allianz Life was announced as the sponsor for the stadium. Allianz Life, a subsidiary of German company Allianz, is headquartered in nearby Golden Valley. It is one of eight sports facilities around the world that is sponsored by Allianz or its subsidiaries. The naming rights agreement with Allianz runs until the end of 2028 and costs an undisclosed amount.

Due to the stadium's resemblance to the floating city on Bespin in the fictional Star Wars universe, Allianz Field has gained the nickname "Cloud City."

=== Construction ===
The stadium was planned to break ground in June 2016, but was delayed while the team awaited a tax-exemption from the state, similar to ones granted to other recent stadium projects. Despite the stadium construction being privately funded, the franchise owners stated that the tax-exemption was needed for the project's viability.

In addition, because stadium construction would eliminate Rainbow Foods – an anchor tenant in the Midway Shopping Center – strip mall owner RK Midway of New York faced lease complications with its smaller tenants. Industry analysts say intense competition between the grocery company SuperValu (which operated Rainbow within the strip mall) and rivals, primarily Hy-Vee, made it unlikely that Rainbow would terminate its lease early without a signed guarantee against a competitor moving into the shopping center.

A ceremonial groundbreaking was held on December 12, 2016, and was attended by MLS commissioner Don Garber. Major construction on the site began in June 2017. Steel erection began in November 2017 and construction reached a halfway milestone in late April 2018. On Jan 23, 2019, the logo for the inaugural season was revealed as an interpretation of the stadium. Construction on the stadium was completed by Mortenson Construction on February 27, 2019, after 20 months of work.

== Major events ==
=== Soccer ===
The first home game at the stadium was held on April 13, 2019, against New York City FC, which was attended by a sellout crowd of 19,796. The match ended in a 3–3 draw, with the first goal scored by Osvaldo Alonso in the 13th minute. A winter storm arrived in the Twin Cities the day before the match, requiring grounds crews to scrape away snow and ice from the stadium's seats and parts of the pitch.

The United States men's national soccer team's opening game of the 2019 CONCACAF Gold Cup was held at Allianz Field on June 18, 2019.

On February 2, 2022 the United States men's team hosted Honduras at the stadium in a World Cup qualifier, winning 3–0. Two Hondurans were substituted due to hypothermia, and their coach Hernán Darío Gómez attacked the choice of venue as unsuitable. US coach Gregg Berhalter said that the venue was chosen to be close to the previous game away in Canada, and that he did not complain when his team played in high humidity in Central America. The temperature at the starting whistle was 5 °F (−15 °C), making it the coldest match in the US team's history.

Date	Winning Team	Result	Losing Team	Tournament	Spectators
June 18, 2019	Panama	2–0	Trinidad and Tobago	2019 CONCACAF Gold Cup Group D	19,418
June 18, 2019	United States	4–0	Guyana	2019 CONCACAF Gold Cup Group D	19,418
September 3, 2019	United States	3–0	Portugal	Women's International Friendly	19,600
October 26, 2021	United States	6–0	South Korea	Women's International Friendly	18,115
February 2, 2022	United States	3–0	Honduras	2022 FIFA World Cup qualification – CONCACAF third round	19,202
August 10, 2022	(United States) (Canada) MLS All-Stars	2–1	(Mexico) Liga MX All-Stars	2022 MLS All-Star Game	19,727
September 12, 2023	United States	4–0	Oman	International Friendly	13,665
June 4, 2024	United States	3–0	South Korea	Women's International Friendly	19,169
May 31, 2025	United States	3–0	China	Women's International Friendly	17,046
October 6, 2026	United States	1–0	Canada	International Friendly	19,182

The 2022 MLS All-Star Game was hosted at Allianz Field August 10. The MLS All-Stars competed against the Liga MX All-Stars winning the contest 2-1. It was the second straight MLS victory over Liga MX. Minnesota United's own Dayne St. Clair earned MVP on the night by making four saves in front of his home fans.

=== College football ===
The first college football game at Allianz Field was a rivalry game between St. Thomas and St. John's; it took place on October 19, 2019. St. John's won the game 38-20 in front of a crowd of 19,508.

=== MLS Cup Playoffs ===
Following the St. Thomas–St. John's college football game, field crews switched the field back to soccer to prepare for Minnesota United's first MLS Cup Playoffs match, played the following day against the LA Galaxy. Minnesota lost 2–1 and were subsequently knocked out of the playoffs.

Events and tenants
Preceded by Huntington Bank Stadium	Home of the Minnesota United FC; 2019–present	Succeeded by Current Stadium
