= Ax-Man Surplus =

Chain of surplus stores in the Twin Cities, Minnesota

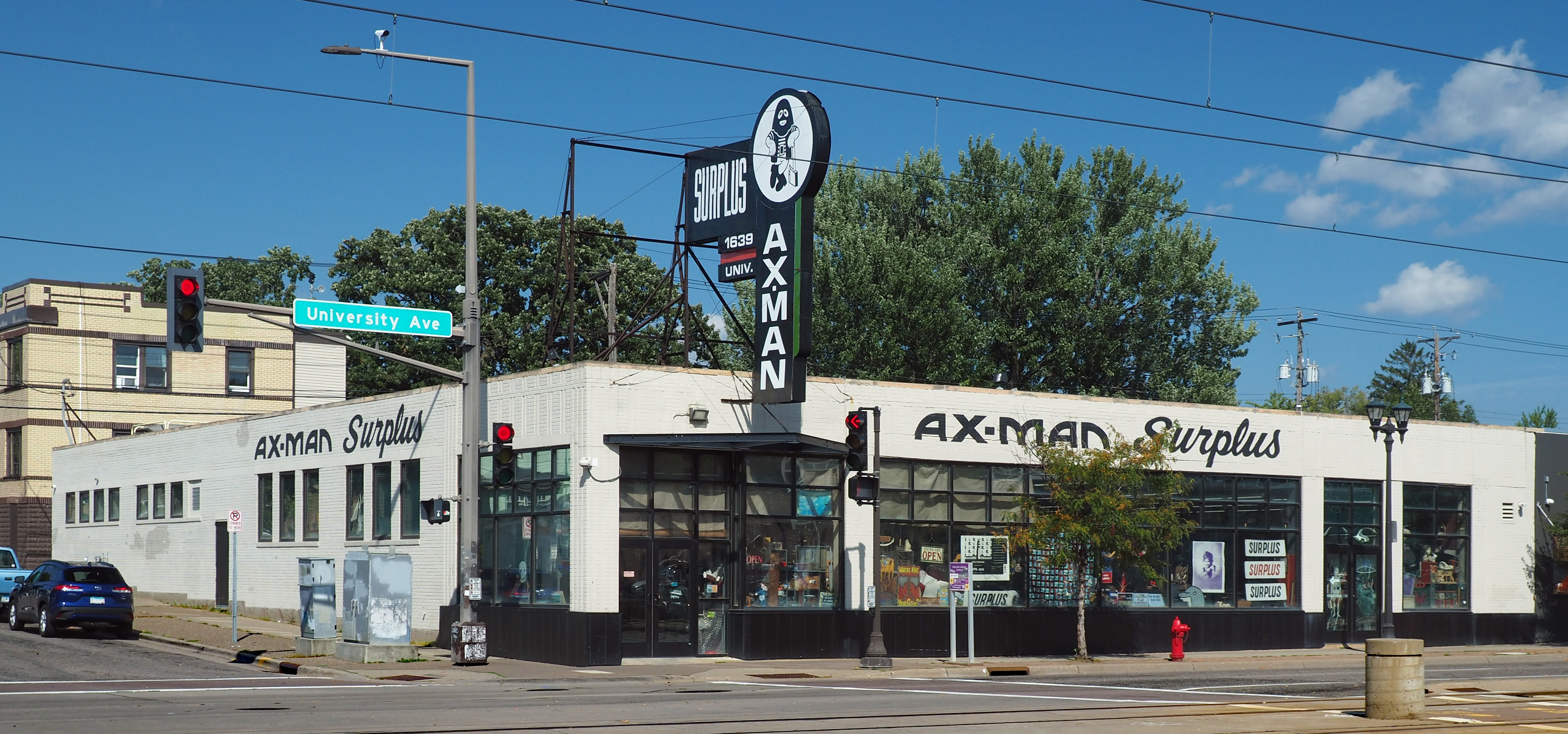
The flagship Ax-Man Surplus location in Saint Paul, Minnesota

Ax-Man Surplus is a chain of surplus stores in the Twin Cities metro area in Minnesota, United States, known locally for its eclectic atmosphere and unique selection of merchandise. They specialize in industrial and scientific surplus, as well as manufacturing surplus and failed consumer products. The chain has locations in Saint Paul, Fridley, and St. Louis Park, as well as an online store.

== History ==
Ax-Man was founded by Jess Liberman, a native of Saint Paul whose father was a tailor. In the early 1960s, Liberman acquired a large lot of shoes, which he proceeded to sell at his father's business. In the mid-1960s he opened a store in downtown Saint Paul, which he called "The Man With The Ax". In the late 1960s, University of Minnesota art school graduate David Gray began working at the store, and in the 1970s he became a partner in the business, with the two developing the store that was to become the modern Ax-Man Surplus. The Fridley location was opened in the mid-1980s. After Liberman's death in the 1990s, Gray bought the business from his estate, becoming the second owner. In 2001, businessman Jim Segal purchased the business. A location in Crystal was opened in 2009, and closed on Halloween in 2015.

Beginning in 2010, Ax-Man Surplus was one of many businesses on University Avenue in downtown Saint Paul to voice concern regarding the effects of the construction of the Green Line on their business. At a 2011 Metropolitan Council hearing, Segal criticized the Council, accusing them of downplaying the projected effects on businesses in the area. Construction on the Green Line was finished in 2014; the Snelling Avenue station now sits across the street from the Saint Paul store.

The stores were closed for around seven weeks in early 2020 due to the COVID-19 pandemic. During the unrest that followed the murder of George Floyd in May 2020, the flagship location in Saint Paul was broken into and vandalized. Segal was inside the store at the time, and had to barricade himself inside of his office as the store was occupied by rioters. Following this, the store was closed for repairs until mid-July.
