= Larry Millett =

American journalist and author (born 1947)

- Born: 1947 (age 78–79); Minneapolis, Minnesota, U.S.
- Education: University of Chicago, St. John's University
- Occupations: Journalist, author
- Writing career
- Subjects: Crime fiction (Sherlock Holmes), history of Minnesota, architectural history
- Notable works: Lost Twin Cities, Strange Days, Dangerous Nights, Sherlock Holmes and the Red Demon and sequels
- Website: larrymillett.com

Larry Millett (born 1947) is an American journalist and author. He is the former (retired 2002) architectural critic for the St. Paul Pioneer Press, a daily newspaper in Saint Paul, Minnesota and the author of several books on the history of architecture in Minnesota. He has also written a series of Sherlock Holmes mysteries set in the United States and Minnesota in the 1890s. The books feature the character Shadwell Rafferty who assists Holmes in his American investigations.

== Early life and education ==
Millett was born in 1947 in Minneapolis, Minnesota. He graduated from St. John's University in Collegeville with a Bachelor of Arts degree in English in 1969. He received a master's degree in English in 1970 from the University of Chicago.

== Career ==
Millett worked at the Pioneer Press from 1972 until 1984 when he had an opportunity to study architecture at the University of Michigan in Ann Arbor. When he returned to St. Paul in 1985, he became the newspaper's first architecture critic. He has written articles for several historical and architectural magazines in the Midwest, mostly focusing on works by Prairie School architects including Louis Sullivan and Frank Lloyd Wright.

Millett's Lost Twin Cities is probably the best known of his works in the Minneapolis-St. Paul region largely because KTCA, a local public television station, created a video documentary by the same name which covered a few of the buildings in the book. The video was narrated by Dave Moore, a noted area TV journalist, and is often replayed when the station is running a pledge drive. In 2014, Millet was interviewed by Peter Shea for the Institute for Advanced Study at the University of Minnesota in the Twin Cities. Millett has also been interviewed twice on the Northern Lights Minnesota Author Interview TV Series.

== Bibliography ==
=== Nonfiction ===
- The Curve of the Arch: The Story of Louis Sullivan's Owatonna Bank (1985) ISBN 0-87351-181-6 & ISBN 0-87351-182-4
- Lost Twin Cities (1992) ISBN 0-87351-273-1
- Twin Cities Then and Now (1996) ISBN 0-87351-326-6 & ISBN 0-87351-327-4
- National Register of Historic Places in Minnesota (foreword, 2003) ISBN 0-87351-448-3
- Strange Days, Dangerous Nights: Photos from the Speed Graphic Era (2004) ISBN 0-87351-504-8
- AIA Guide to the Twin Cities: The Essential Source on the Architecture of Minneapolis and St. Paul (Paperback) (2007) ISBN 0-87351-540-4
- Murder Has a Public Face (2008)
- AIA Guide to Downtown Minneapolis (2010) ISBN 0873517202
- Once There Were Castles: Lost Mansions and Estates of the Twin Cities (2011)
- Minnesota's Own (2014)
- Heart of St. Paul: A History of the Pioneer and Endicott Buildings (2016) ISBN 1517901464

=== Fiction ===
==== Sherlock Holmes in Minnesota ====
- Sherlock Holmes and the Red Demon (1996) ISBN 0-670-87039-0
- Sherlock Holmes and the Ice Palace Murders (1998) ISBN 0-670-87944-4 & ISBN 0-14-028089-8
- Sherlock Holmes and the Rune Stone Mystery (1999) ISBN 0-670-88821-4 & ISBN 0-14-029645-X
- Sherlock Holmes and the Secret Alliance (2001)
- The Disappearance of Sherlock Holmes (2002) ISBN 0-14-200340-9
- "The Mystery of the Jeweled Cross" (short story, 2002) ISBN 1-879832-40-2 & ISBN 1-879832-38-0
- "The Brewer's Son" (short story, 2006)
- The Magic Bullet: A Locked Room Mystery Featuring Shadwell Rafferty and Sherlock Holmes (2011) ISBN 0-8166-7480-9
- Strongwood: A Crime Dossier (2014) ISBN 0-8166-9093-6
- Sherlock Holmes and the Eisendorf Enigma (2017)
- Rafferty's Last Case (2022)
- Mysterious Tales of Old St. Paul: Three Cases Featuring Shadwell Rafferty (2024)

==== Other works ====
- Pineland Serenade (2020)
