= Union Park, Saint Paul =

Coordinates: 44°57′21″N 93°10′49″W

Union Park
- Neighborhood
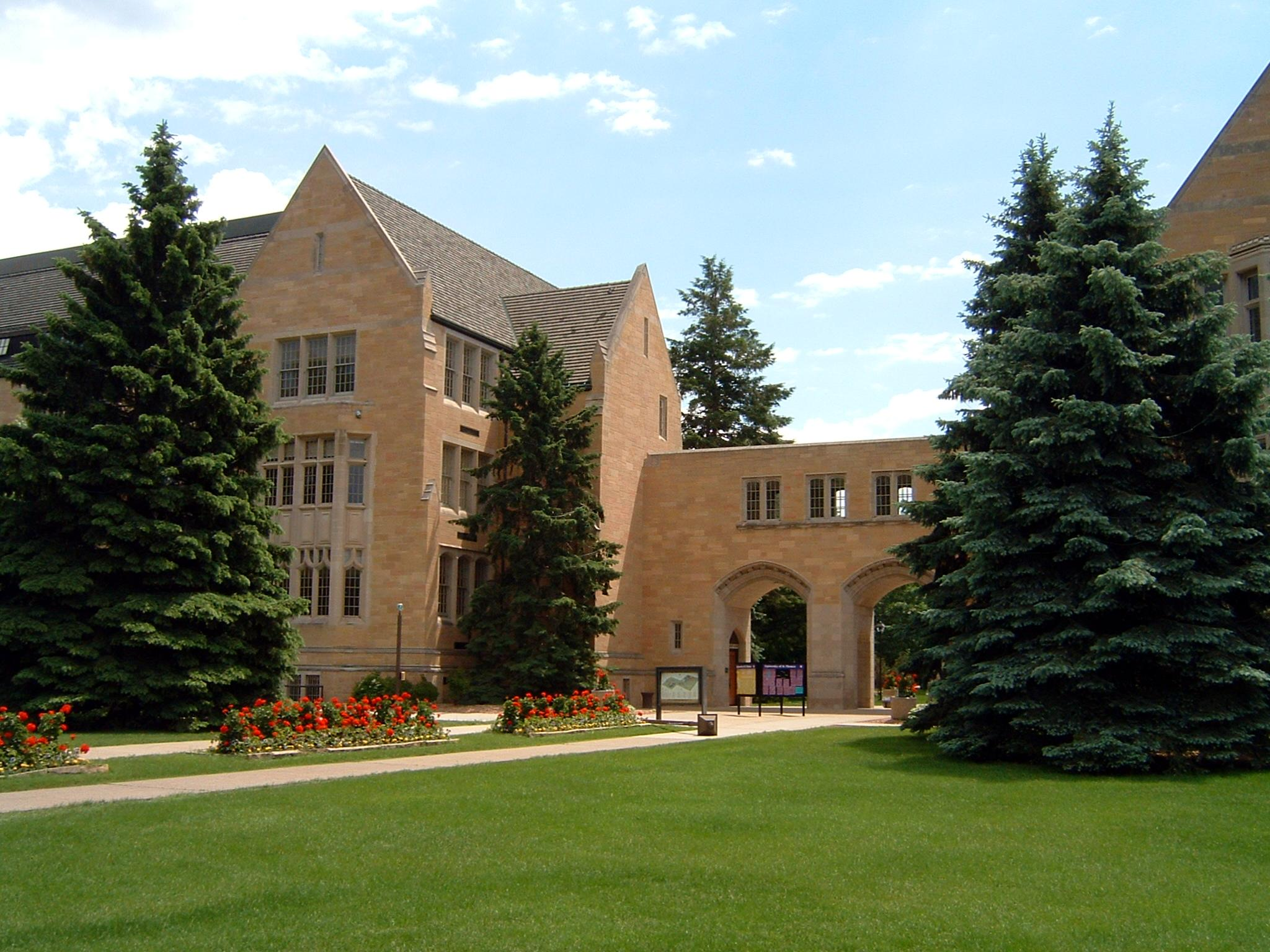
- The campus of the University of St. Thomas.
- Nickname: Merriam Park
- Country: United States
- State: Minnesota
- County: Ramsey
- City: Saint Paul

Population (2010)
  - Total: 17,901
- Time zone: UTC-6 (CST)
  - Summer (DST): UTC-5 (CDT)
- Area code: 651
- Website: http://unionparkdc.org/

Union Park is a neighborhood in Saint Paul in the U.S. state of Minnesota. Created as a merger of several historic neighborhoods including Merriam Park, Snelling-Hamline, Parts of Midway, Desnoyer Park, and Lexington-Hamline, it is bordered by University Avenue on the north, Lexington Parkway on the east, Summit Avenue on the south, and the Mississippi National River and Recreation Area on the west. Despite the merger, many of the historic neighborhoods hold onto their original identity, especially in Lexington-Hamline (Locally known as Lexham) and Merriam Park.

== History ==
The first area of Union Park to be settled is the area known as Merriam Park, named after John L. Merriam, a local real estate investor and entrepreneur. Merriam Park was one of the city's first streetcar suburbs, growing around a depot on what is now the Canadian Pacific Railway's Merriam Park Subdivision. Merriam envisioned the neighborhood, located approximately midway between downtown Saint Paul and downtown Minneapolis, as a natural home for the two cities' elite. Although the area was considered in the late nineteenth century for both the Cathedral of Saint Paul and the Minnesota State Capitol, these plans did not come to pass, and the area developed as a home for businessmen and professional workers and their families.

Streetcar lines along Marshall Avenue (which becomes Lake Street in Minneapolis), Selby Avenue, and Snelling Avenue helped propel development in the neighborhood, which grew a tightly knit and largely Catholic community around St. Mark's Church. The neighborhood remained stable into the middle part of the twentieth century, when plans to build a section of Interstate 94 through the neighborhood drew intense community activism. Although the freeway was ultimately built along the original alignment, the fight galvanized the formation of the area's strong neighborhood organizations, many of which continue to operate to this day.

Neighborhood activism against the freeway was focused against plans to construct an interchange for southbound Interstate 94 at Prior Avenue, a largely residential street at the center of the district which fronted parks, schools, and St. Mark's Church. Because of the area's upper-middle class character, the neighborhood was more successful in pushing its goals than the Rondo and Prospect Park neighborhoods to the east and west, respectively, both of which were largely inhabited by people of more mixed socioeconomic status. Local leaders enlisted to help fight the interchange included Archbishop William Brady and Senators Hubert Humphrey and Eugene McCarthy.

Until 2007, the area was divided into three neighborhood organizations which represented areas substantially smaller than those represented by most of the other 16 district councils. In order to provide more equitable funding citywide, the three neighborhoods were merged into one entity, which took the name Union Park. The nonprofit which represents Union Park today retains substantial representation from these previous groups, most of which remain active.

== Name ==
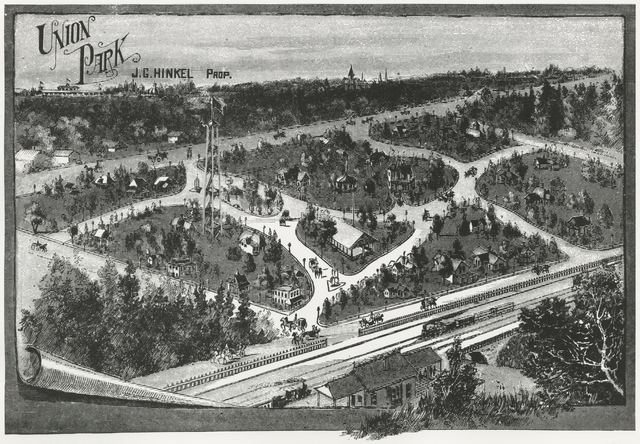
Union Park in 1886

The original Union Park was a large recreational area located at the intersection of University and Lynnhurst Avenues in Saint Paul, Minnesota. Also known as Lake Iris Park, it opened in 1880 shortly after the completion of the Chicago, Milwaukee and St. Paul Railroad's "Short Line" route. The grounds of the park included a bowling alley, bandstand, dance hall, carousel, zoo and observation tower. By 1884 the amusement park had closed, and the property was divided into residential lots. The resulting neighborhood was also called Union Park. All that remains of Lake Iris is the present-day Iris Park, a small public space with an artificial pond.

== Transportation ==
The METRO Green Line light rail, which opened on June 14, 2014, serves the neighborhood with stops on University Avenue at Fairview Avenue, Snelling Avenue, Hamline Avenue, and Lexington Parkway. The A Line bus rapid transit system also runs along Snelling Avenue through the district.
