= Har Mar Mall =

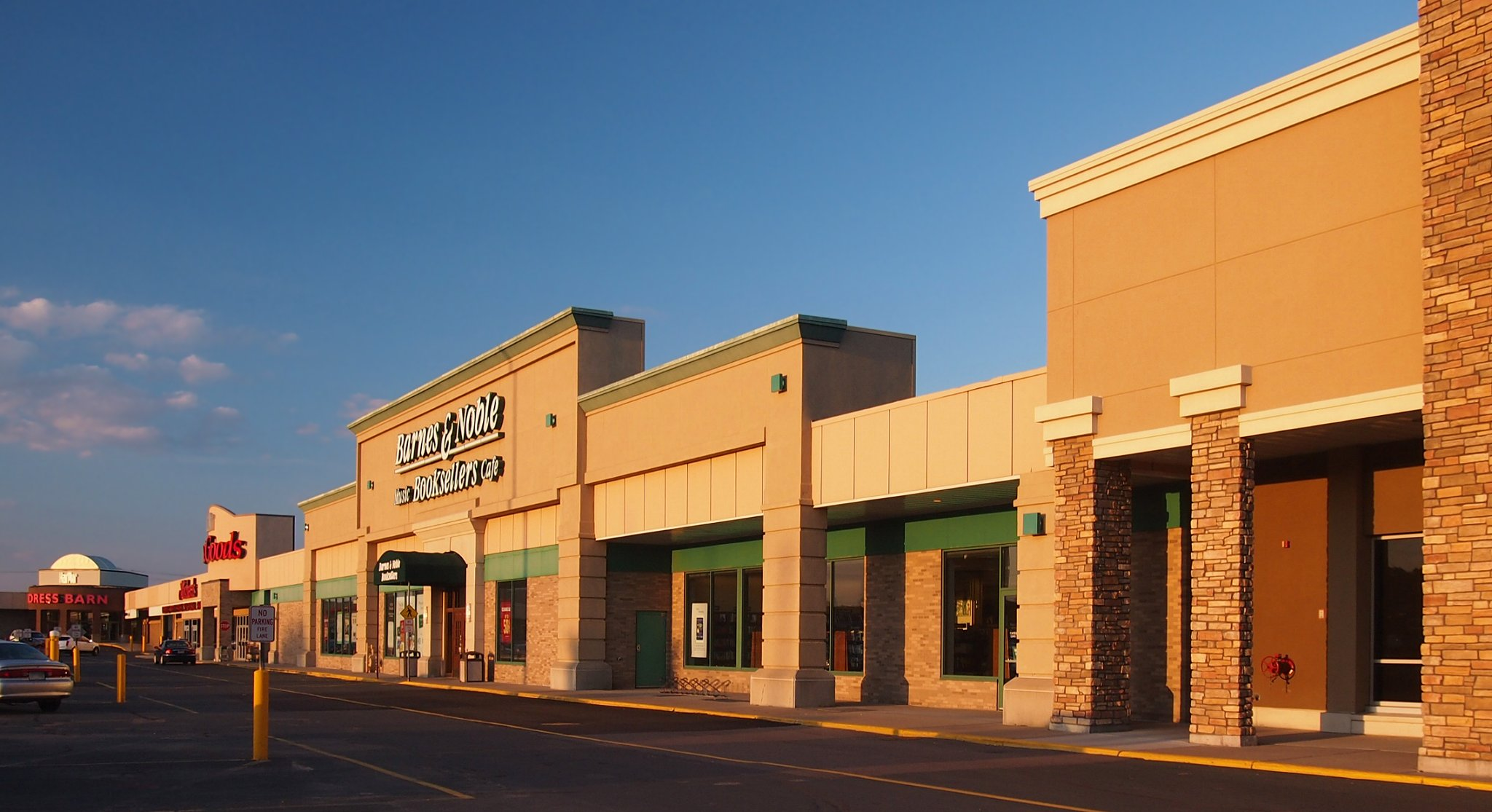
- A row of shops in Har Mar Mall's western façade
- Location: Roseville, Minnesota, United States
- Coordinates: 45°00′17″N 93°09′50″W
- Address: 2100 North Snelling Avenue
- Opened: August 1963
- Manager: Vanbarton Services LLC
- Owner: FIDELIS
- Architect: Thorsen Associates
- Num. of stores: 45
- Num. of anchor tenants: 17
- Floor area: 430,000 square feet (40,000 m^{2})
- Floors: 1
- Public transit: Metro Transit
- Website: harmarmall.com

Har Mar Mall is an enclosed shopping mall in Roseville, Minnesota, United States, a suburb of the Twin Cities. Har Mar Mall comprises over 430,000 square feet (40,000 m^{2}) of retail space and the mall's anchor stores are Famous Footwear, Michaels, Barnes & Noble, K&G Fashion Superstore, Cub Foods, H&R Block, Waxing the City, Elements Massage, and a Chase Bank branch. The mall contains 45 tenants.

Opened in 1963 and expanded several times since, it is one of two enclosed malls in Roseville; the other is Rosedale Center. Despite being a relatively small shopping center, Har Mar Mall remains open. It was constructed by Robert W. Fendler of Fendler Patterson and is owned and managed by the Vanbarton Group and Varbarton Services respectively.

== History ==
Construction for the Har Mar Mall began in 1961, when Harold J. Slawik had a vision to build a "super mall", similar to shopping centers he had seen while traveling in Florida. "Har Mar" is a combination of the names of its owners, Harold J. Slawik and his wife Marie. It was built upon 50 acres of land near a busy intersection in Roseville, Minnesota. Minnesota native Willard Thorsen, who designed Apache Plaza in nearby St. Anthony, designed the mall, while Robert W. Fendler served as the mall's architect. According to Thorsen, the mall consists of "a long corridor, which zigzags at a series of angles... that make Har Mar truly unique"; it features "massively wide" hallways and "arched ceilings with large windows" to allow natural light to enter the corridors.

The mall cost nearly $6 million to construct over a span of two years. During the summer of 1962, Harold Slawik died, leaving his wife in charge of the mall's construction; Mrs. Slawik reportedly worked 80 hour weeks in order to keep up with the mall. In May of the same year, Target constructed their first location in a parking lot directly north of Har Mar. Har Mar was anchored by a JCPenney on the north end of the mall and a Hove's supermarket on the south end as well as a National Tea supermarket on the Northwest end. While nearby Rosedale Center was constructed in 1969, Har Mar went through a significant expansion in the early 1970s.

In 1970, the construction of a twin theater, Har Mar 1 & 2, was completed and became the Twin Cities' second double-screened cinema; its luxurious design included a "spacious lobby, with three Venetian glass chandeliers and bubbling fountains". The facility was originally owned by General Cinema Corporation (GCC, later acquired by AMC Theatres) and constructed by architect Benjamin Gingold Jr. In 1977, the larger of the theater’s two auditoriums was itself twinned, creating a triplex, as the theater was renamed the Har-Mar 3. In 1981, a former grocery store behind the theater was transformed into another eight small screens, giving the theater 11 screens total, making it the largest (and at times the top-grossing) cinema theater in the state.

In 1977, JCPenney left Har Mar for a new store at Rosedale which opened on August 3rd 1977. The JCPenney auto center would eventually become a Firestone and in 1982 Marshalls opened in most of the former JCPenney.

On the afternoon of June 14, 1981, Har Mar Mall was damaged by a large tornado. While the tornado only affected the mall's cosmetic appearance, several nearby local businesses and residences were left in ruins following the impact. Shortly after the tornado, a large renovation occurred to update the mall's appearance and fix any damage left by it. In 1988, another expansion took place, allowing Har Mar to acquire several larger retailers in the newly constructed space; the opening of Highland Superstore and TJ Maxx took place later this year, along with the addition of a new food court with seating for over 400 people. Three years later, the Highland Superstore was converted to BizMart, a regional office supply store. OfficeMax acquired BizMart in 1992 before ultimately closing in 1995; Around this time the largest Barnes & Noble in Minnesota and second in the U.S. to their New York location would open in vacant tenant spaces next to the Har Mar Theater. HomePlace opened in the space vacated by OfficeMax, and is currently leased by HomeGoods, the successor of HomePlace. In the 2000s, Har Mar underwent a cosmetic makeover that cost previous owner Emmes Realty Services nearly $12 million; Emmes sparked interest in opening a Von Maur at the center, but the proposal eventually dissolved.

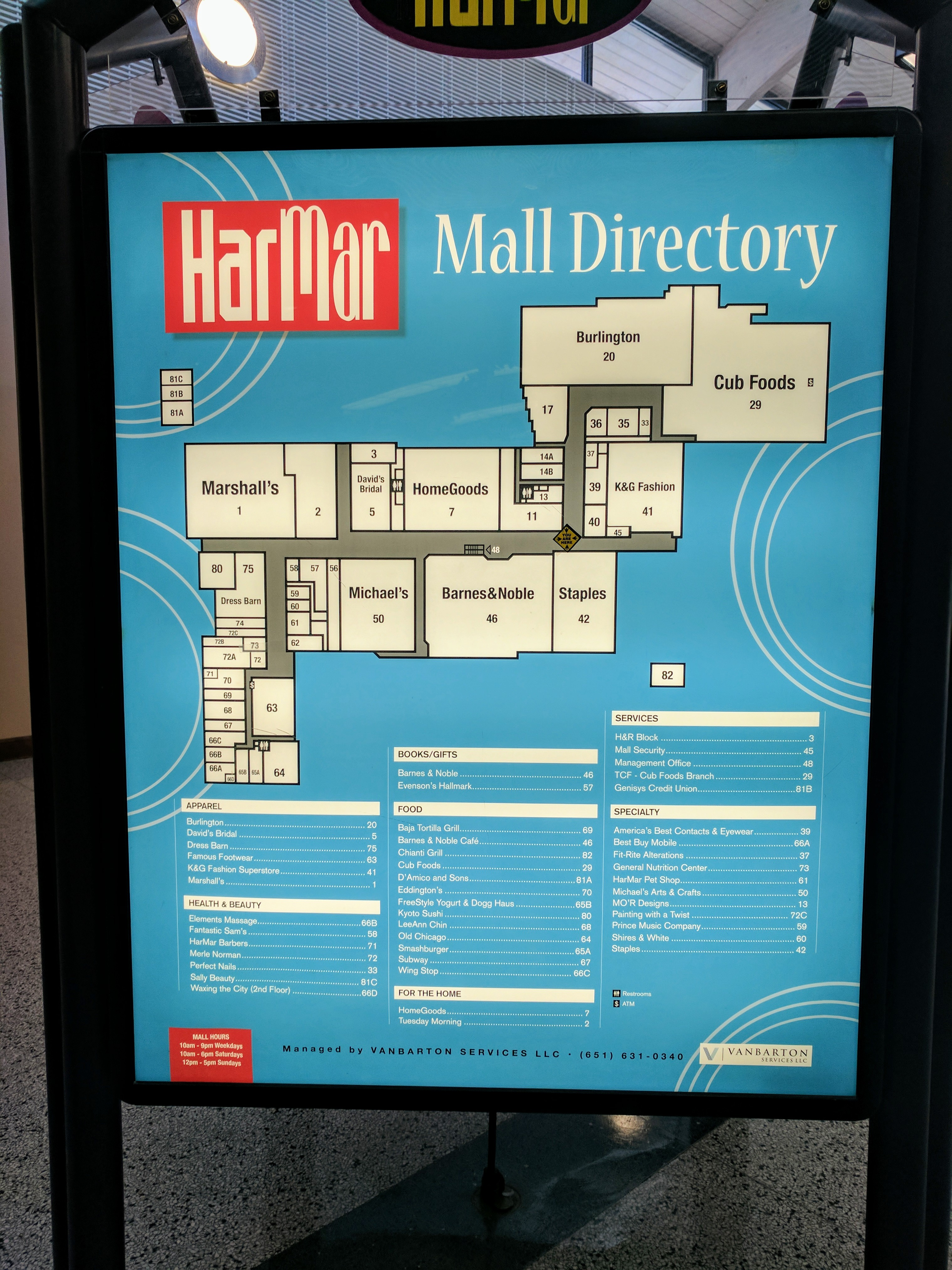
Mall directory from December 2016

By the early 2000s, the once-booming cinema had become outdated in technology and in seating styles. In 2006, AMC (which owned the Har Mar theaters) opened a new theater complex nearby in Rosedale with digital technology and stadium seating, and the once-thriving screens at Har Mar permanently shuttered.

In 2014, Burlington Coat Factory, a discount apparel retailer, announced that they planned to lease a 52,300 square feet (4,900 m^{2}) space previously occupied by Northwestern Books; the opening of this location allowed all of Har Mar's anchor tenants to be completely leased. Currently, the mall still prospers mixing "large, special interest stores, as well as a variety of smaller, more unique stores" under one roof. Several new tenants and businesses have begun leasing space in the center, such as Staples Inc., D'Amico & Sons, and several other fine dining establishments.

== In popular culture ==
Musician Sean Tillmann uses the name Har Mar Superstar as his stage name. According to Sean Tillmann, Superstar's legal name, he acquired the name after spending his youth "watching movies and writing songs about passers-by in the food court" at Har Mar Mall. He visited the shopping mall frequently as "it was across the street from where [he] worked in an office job".
