= Rosedale Transit Center =

Bus station in Roseville, Minnesota

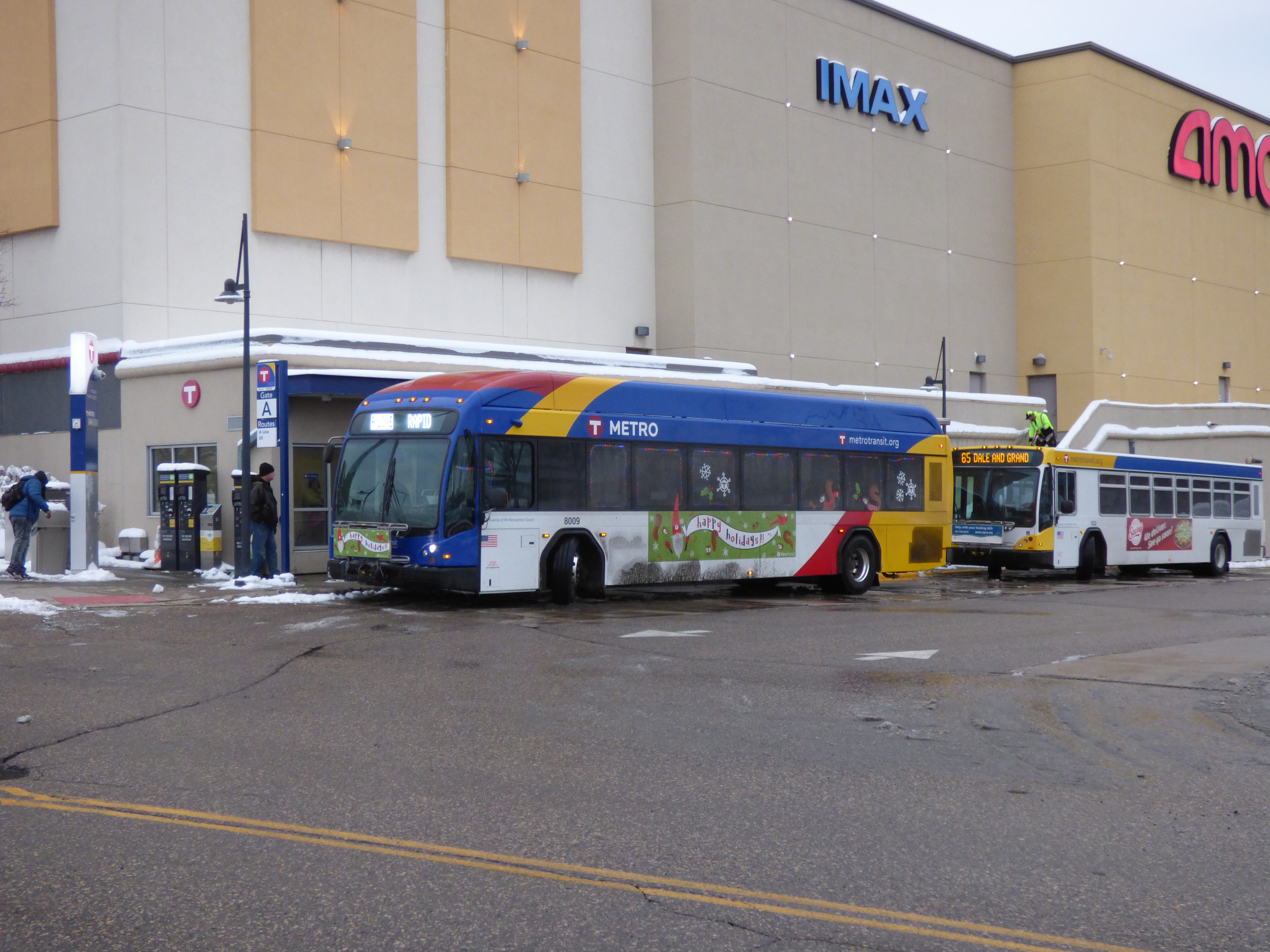
- Rosedale Transit Center in 2019.

General information
- Location: 10 Rosedale Shopping Center; Roseville, MN 55113
- Coordinates: 45°0′45.36″N 93°10′5.88″W
- Owner: Metro Transit
- Line: A Line
- Connections: 32, 65, 83, 87, 223, 225, 227, 264, 801

Construction
- Parking: No
- Accessible: Yes

History
- Opened: June 11, 2016 (BRT service)

Passengers
- 2025: 513 daily
- Rank: 22 out of 129

Services
Preceding station	Metro	Following station
Snelling & County Road B toward 46th Street	A Line	Terminus
Location

Rosedale Transit Center is a transit center in the Saint Paul suburb of Roseville, Minnesota. The transit center is named after the adjacent shopping mall, Rosedale Center. Rosedale Transit Center is the northern terminus for the Metro A Line, a bus rapid transit line serving Saint Paul and south Minneapolis. The site is leased to Metro Transit by the mall, and includes an indoor waiting area, real-time information, and ticket vending machines. The transit center also provides timed transfers to nine local bus routes.

== See also ==
- Metro
- A Line
