= Metro A Line (Minnesota) =

Bus rapid transit line

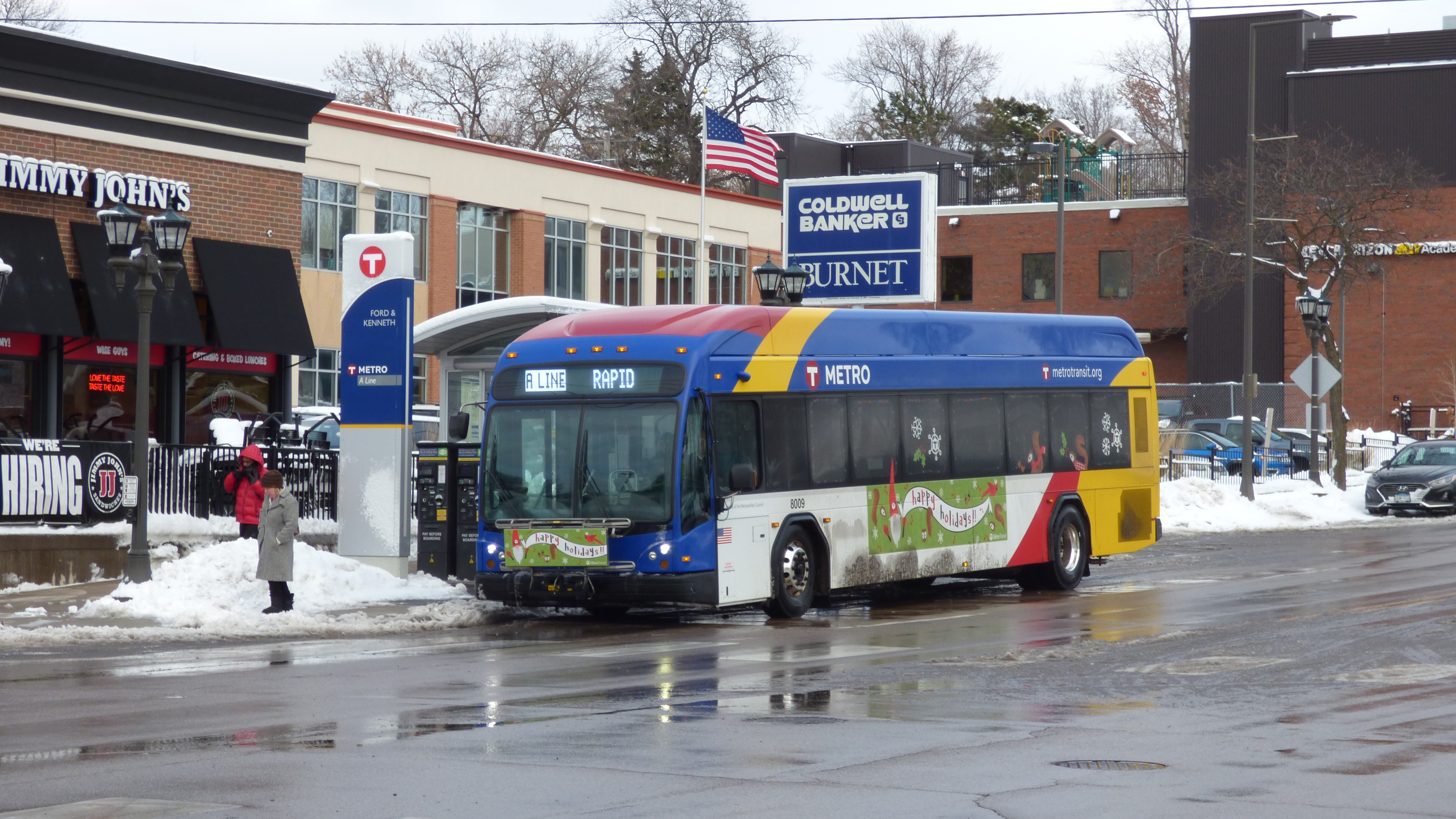
- A Line bus at Ford & Kenneth station in 2019

Overview
- System: Metro
- Operator: Metro Transit
- Garage: Nicollet
- Vehicle: Gillig Low Floor BRT Plus
- Status: Operational
- Began service: June 11, 2016
- Predecessors: 84; Snelling Streetcar

Route
- Route type: Bus rapid transit
- Locale: Minneapolis–St. Paul, Minnesota
- Start: 46th Street Station
- Via: Ford Parkway, Snelling Avenue
- End: Rosedale Center
- Length: 9.9 miles (15.9 km)
- Stations: 20

Service
- Level: Daily
- Frequency: Every 10 minutes
- Journey time: 34 minutes
- Operates: 4:00am - 1:00am
- Ridership: 4,053 (avg. weekday 2025)
Route map
- All stations are accessible

The Metro A Line is a bus rapid transit route in the Minneapolis–Saint Paul region of Minnesota, operated by Metro Transit as part of the Metro rapid transit network. The A Line operates a north-south route along Snelling Avenue, connecting 46th Street station in Minneapolis and Rosedale Center in Roseville, via Ford Parkway and the Intercity Bridge.

Metro Transit describes the A Line's service as "arterial bus rapid transit" (aBRT), which includes off-board fare collection, enhanced bus stops, and transit signal priority. The history of the Snelling Avenue transit corridor dates to 1905, when Twin City Rapid Transit streetcar service began. Streetcars were replaced by buses in 1952, and planning for upgraded bus service on the corridor began in the early 2000s. Construction cost approximately $27 million, and A Line service began in 2016.

== Route description ==
The A Line's southern terminus is at the 46th Street station in Minneapolis, a major transfer point for bus and light rail services. Buses travel east on 46th Street and cross the Mississippi River on the Intercity Bridge. East of the Mississippi River, buses travel east on Ford Parkway to Snelling Avenue. Buses travel north on Snelling Avenue to Rosedale Center, terminating at the Rosedale Transit Center on the west side of the mall.

The A Line serves multiple regional destinations along its route, including Minnehaha Park, Macalester College, Allianz Field, Hamline University, the Minnesota State Fairgrounds, and Har Mar Mall. Major transit connections along the route include the Metro Green Line at Snelling & University station and the Metro B Line at Snelling & Dayton station.

== Service ==
A Line frequency
Day	Time	Frequency	Span of service	
Weekday	Mornings	10–30 minutes	4:00 a.m. – 6:00 a.m.	
Weekday	Rush hours	10 minutes	6:00 a.m. – 9:00 a.m.	3:00 p.m. – 6:30 p.m.
Weekday	Midday	10 minutes	9:00 a.m. – 3:00 p.m.	
Weekday	Evening	10–30 minutes	6:30 p.m. – 1:30 a.m.	
Saturday		10–30 minutes	4:00 a.m. – 1:15 a.m.	
Sunday/Holiday		10–30 minutes	4:00 a.m. – 1:15 a.m.	

The A Line runs every 10 minutes during daytime service on weekdays and weekends, with reduced frequencies of up to 30 minutes in the early morning and late evening. Route 84, which previously served the Snelling Avenue corridor, was retained with 30-minute service to provide connections from the corridor to other areas. When the Green Line opened in 2014, just the Snelling Avenue portion of the route had 10-minute service. After the opening of the A Line, the entire corridor had 10-minute service which was part of an increase of 63,300 to 80,900 annual service hours. Estimated annual operating costs are $4.2 million.

Ridership in the corridor, which combines the A Line and Route 84, rose from 3,800 weekday rides to 5,100 weekday rides over the same time period in the first month after opening. In the overall first year of operation, ridership in the corridor increased by 30%. The A Line served almost 1.7 million rides in 2019 which was a 3 percent increase from the year before.

== Features ==
The A Line employs several features of bus rapid transit, which provides service six to eight minutes faster than the previous service on Snelling Avenue. Transit signal priority is installed at 19 of the 34 traffic signals on the line, which has improved reliability on the line. Notably, the corridor lacks bus lanes, which are typical for many bus rapid transit lines. Metro Transit excluded bus lanes from the planning process.

In January 2018, the A Line had improved its on-time performance to 94%, a significant improvement over the 90.7% rate of its predecessor local service. Stations are spaced at roughly 1/2-mile (0.80 km) intervals, which helps limit the time spent on accelerating and stopping the bus. Previous buses in the corridor stopped at up to 80 stops, while the A Line travels further between stops and has only 20 stations located at high-traffic areas.

Stations on the A Line have enhanced features to differentiate them from local bus stops. Station shelters follow a standardized design, used throughout Metro's bus rapid transit system. Stations have lighted canopies, on-demand heating, security cameras and emergency telephones, benches, and bike parking. Pavement in boarding areas are treated with a darker shade of concrete to delineate them from the sidewalk. Ticket vending machines and Go-To card readers are located on platforms for off-board fare collection, speeding up the boarding process and reducing bus dwell time. Each station has a pylon marker that provides real-time bus arrival information and station identification. Illuminated signage at the top of the station blinks when a bus arriving. Curbs at stations have tactile warning strips and are raised 9 in (23 cm) from the road surface, facilitating near-level boarding to speed up and make boarding easier. Many stations feature bus bulbs, which allow buses to avoid pulling out of the travel lane.

The initial A Line bus fleet featured 12 new buses, purchased at a cost of $500,000 each, approximately 10% more than a normal bus. Buses used on the A Line have more standing room than other Metro Transit buses, stainless steel seat frames, and provide free on-board Wi-Fi. Buses have a unique exterior paint scheme from other Metro Transit vehicles, rounded exterior molding edges, and brighter digital displays. The internal digital displays are able to show real-time service information on connecting routes, announcements, and what stops are upcoming. Initially 12 buses were purchased for the line with 3 being new buses and 9 being replacement buses from an existing contract with Gillig. An additional bus was purchased a month after the line opened to improve maintenance and reliability operations.

The passenger experience and legibility of the line helped it be described as "probably the best bus route in the US" by one transit expert. Riders are more satisfied with the A Line's service than regular route local bus service. Six police officers were added to the Metro Transit Police Department to monitor buses and check tickets on the A Line.

== Stations ==
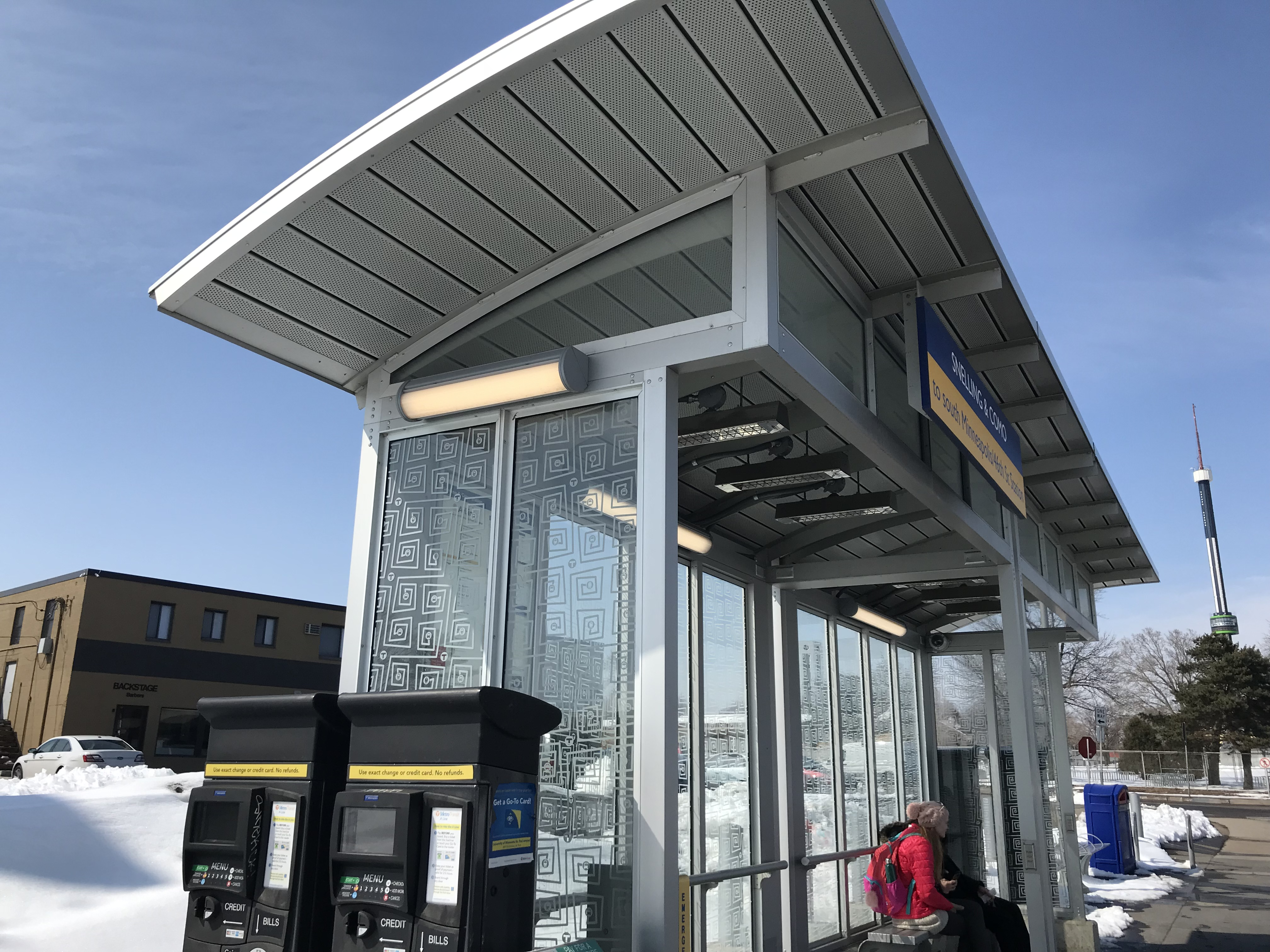
A typical A Line station at Snelling & Como.

Station	Neighborhood(s)	City	Opened	Connections	Fall 2019 Weekday Ridership
Rosedale Transit Center	Roseville		June 11, 2016	Routes 32, 65, 87, 223, 225, 227, 264, 801	693
Snelling & County Road B	Roseville		June 11, 2016	65	393
Snelling & Larpenteur	Falcon Heights		June 11, 2016	Route 61	201
Snelling & Hoyt-Nebraska	Como	Falcon Heights, Saint Paul	June 11, 2016	No routes	79
Snelling & Midway Parkway (Note: Nouthbound service only during the Minnesota State Fair)	Como	Saint Paul	August 25, 2016	No routes	No regular service
Snelling & Como	Como	Saint Paul	June 11, 2016	Route 3	269
Snelling & Hewitt	Hamline-Midway	Saint Paul	June 11, 2016	No routes	135
Snelling & Minnehaha	Hamline-Midway	Saint Paul	June 11, 2016	Route 67	240
Snelling & University	Hamline-Midway, Union Park	Saint Paul	June 11, 2016	Green Line, Route 72	1,120
Snelling & Dayton	Union Park	Saint Paul	June 11, 2016	B Line	238
Snelling & Grand	Macalester-Groveland	Saint Paul	June 11, 2016	Route 63	359
Snelling & St. Clair	Macalester-Groveland	Saint Paul	June 11, 2016	No routes	119
Snelling & Randolph	Macalester-Groveland, Highland Park	Saint Paul	June 11, 2016	Route 74	270
Snelling & Highland	Highland Park	Saint Paul	June 11, 2016	No routes	144
Ford & Fairview	Highland Park	Saint Paul	June 11, 2016	No routes	56
Ford & Kenneth	Highland Park	Saint Paul	June 11, 2016	Routes 23, 74, 87, 134	154
Ford & Finn	Highland Park	Saint Paul	June 11, 2016	Routes 23, 74, 87, 134	228
Ford & Woodlawn	Highland Park	Saint Paul	June 11, 2016	No routes	52
46th Street & 46th Avenue	Hiawatha	Minneapolis	June 11, 2016	Route 23	52
46th Street & Minnehaha	Hiawatha	Minneapolis	June 11, 2016	Routes 7, 9	84
46th Street Station	Ericsson	Minneapolis	June 11, 2016	Blue Line, Routes 7, 9, 46, 74, 436, 446	699

== History ==
Streetcars ran along Snelling Avenue from 1905 until 1952. The line was an important crosstown connection to many other streetcar lines. The Snelling streetcar line did not travel north of Larpenteur Avenue and instead traveled closer to Como Park along Como Ave, Pascal Ave, Arlington Ave, and Hamline Ave. In 1947 a shuttle bus began to run from Snelling and Como Avenues, north past Larpenteur Avenue to Roselawn Avenue in Roseville. The bus service was extended and connected with the replacement bus service along Snelling Avenue that was instituted in 1952 when streetcars no longer ran the route. At its peak, the Twin City Rapid Transit Company ran 10-minute peak, and 15-minute offpeak service on the corridor. The Snelling Streetcar Shops and then later Snelling Bus Garage, both located at the intersection of Snelling and University Avenues, served many transit routes in the area including service along Snelling Avenue. Portions of the Snelling Streetcar Shops were turned into a shopping center and the Snelling Bus Barn was torn down in 2001. Allianz Field was later constructed on portions of the former bus barn.

Return of streetcars to the corridor has been studied. In 2001, a neighborhood plan for Macalester Groveland encouraged study of a streetcar along Snelling. The City of Saint Paul along with consultants conducted a $250,000 study of creating streetcar network for the city in 2012–2014. Snelling Avenue as a corridor by itself was one of the five best transit corridors for streetcars, partially due to the transit supportive land use. Pairing a Snelling Avenue streetcar with a route along Ford Parkway was also suggested as a possibility. A streetcar line along the length of Snelling Avenue was not proposed on the long-term network but a portion of Snelling between Hamline University to Selby Avenue was selected as a potential corridor. A Snelling + Ford Parkway streetcar corridor from 46th Street Station to the Green Line and a Snelling North corridor from the Green Line to Como Park scored lower on the study's screening criteria due to lower ridership, less transit supportive land use, and limited potential to redevelop properties. The Snelling + Selby Corridor was not selected as an initial starter line.

Bus service along the corridor in 2010 was provided by Routes 84 and 144. Route 84 ran 15-minute weekday and Saturday service from Rosedale Center before diverging into several branches close to Ford Parkway. Service was only every 30-minutes on Sundays. Route 144 ran along Snelling Avenue from around Ford Parkway until it reached Interstate 94 where it traveled west, exited and served the University of Minnesota, before finishing in downtown Minneapolis. Service was only offered during peak periods at 15–30 minutes frequencies. As part of the Green Line opening in 2014, service for the Route 84 increased to 10-minutes 7 days a week and two branches were combined into one branch. Service to 46th St Station was only every 30-minutes but the A Line was in planning stages to provide 10-minute service along the corridor with a goal opening of 2014. Route 144 was eliminated because it only served 144 rides a day and alternative service was available as a transfer between Route 84 and the Green Line. Travel time was only planned to increase by 6 minutes to the U of M and by 2 minutes to downtown Minneapolis.

The Metropolitan Council, the metropolitan planning organization for the Twin Cities, completed a 2030 Transit Master Study for the region in 2008 which identified arterial bus network corridors and encouraged further study of arterial bus rapid transit projects. The council set the goal of doubling transit ridership by 2030 in their 2030 Transportation Policy Plan and identified implementing arterial bus rapid transit as a method of increasing ridership. Metro Transit began study of 11 corridors for their potential for arterial bus rapid transit in 2011–2012. Those 11 routes served 90,000 riders per weekday, which was close to half of the total ridership for urban routes. Ridership on implemented routes was predicted to increase 20 to 30 percent after the first year of opening. Corridors were evaluated on capital and operating costs, potential ridership, and travel time savings. At the time, an opening for the first BRT line was hoped to open in 2014. By 2012 Snelling Avenue and West Seventh Street were identified as the first two candidates for implementation. Snelling Avenue showed promise for its connection to the Green and Blue lines. While no funding sources were identified, planners hoped to open the line in time for the Green Line opening in 2014.

The project was originally named the Snelling Avenue Bus Rapid Transitway until 2013 when the region's arterial bus rapid transit projects were branded with letters. As the first project, the corridor was named the A Line. The current route of the A Line was approved in 2014 by the Metropolitan Council as the region's first arterial bus rapid transit project. By then an opening date was aimed for late 2015 and further study of a northern extension was still ongoing. Neighborhood plans for the neighborhoods along the corridor encouraged transit accessibility improvements and other changes to support transit along Snelling Avenue. Funding for the project came from a variety of sources including $14.6 million of the costs from CMAQ, Metropolitan Council, and MnDOT Trunkhighway Bonds, as Snelling Avenue also serves as State Highway 51. Other funding came from the state legislature. After design reviews postponed the approval of a contract for station construction until June 2015, the opening date was pushed from late 2015 to 2016. Construction bids were 45% higher than estimated due to delayed bidding and unique project design. Final costs were $27 million compared to a 2012 estimate of $25 million. Metro Transit began testing operating A Line buses along the corridor by February 2016 before the planned June opening. The line officially opened June 11, 2016.

== Future ==
Ramsey County and the St. Paul Area Chamber of Commerce requested the Metropolitan Council study an extension of the A Line before construction of the A Line had begun. The Council agreed to study the extension in November 2013. The extension studied had a northern terminus of the Twin Cities Army Ammunition Plant redevelopment in Arden Hills which is also known as the Rice Creek Commons. The extension would add 10 additional stops and would connect the University of Northwestern – St. Paul and Bethel University, as well as major employers, including Land O'Lakes, Inc. and Boston Scientific, to the broader public transportation system. In the final report issued in September 2016, Metro Transit concluded that there was no funding available and ridership did not support an immediate extension. The study encouraged the development of transit supportive land use and development patterns. The comprehensive plans for the cities of Roseville and Arden Hills both contain sections on an A Line extension and the need to keep BRT in mind when developing land within the corridor.

== See also ==
- Metro Transit
- Metro Red Line
- Metro C Line
