= 46th Street station (Metro Transit) =

Railway and bus station in Minneapolis, Minnesota

46th Street
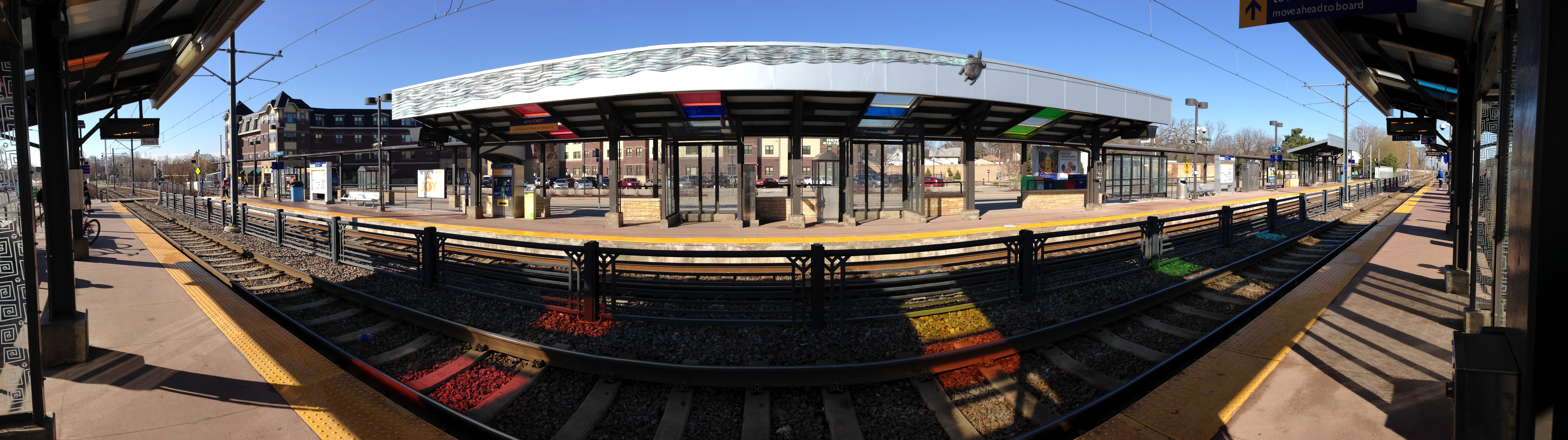
- 46th Street station southbound platform

General information
- Location: 3660 46th Street East; Minneapolis, Minnesota
- Coordinates: 44°55′15″N 93°13′12″W
- Owner: Metro Transit
- Platforms: 2 side platforms
- Tracks: 2
- Connections: Metro Transit: 7, 9, 46, 74; MVTA: 436, 446

Construction
- Structure type: At-grade
- Accessible: Yes

History
- Opened: June 26, 2004

Passengers
- 2025: 1,185 daily ▼8% (LRT)
- Rank: 16 out of 37
- 2025: 446 daily (BRT)
- Rank: 30 out of 129

Services
Preceding station	Metro	Following station
38th Street toward Target Field	Blue Line	50th Street/Minnehaha Park toward Mall of America
Terminus	A Line	46th Street & Minnehaha toward Rosedale
Location

46th Street station is a light rail station on the Metro Blue Line in Minneapolis, Minnesota. This station is located on the northwest corner of the intersection of 46th Street and Minnesota State Highway 55 (Hiawatha Avenue), in the Ericsson neighborhood. This is a side-platform station. Service began at this station when the Blue Line opened on June 26, 2004.

46th Street Station is one of the main bus interchanges on the Blue Line in Minneapolis. Buses serving south Minneapolis and Saint Paul serve the station's bus interchange. A bus rapid transit line, called the A Line, began operating on Snelling Avenue in June 2016, beginning its route at 46th Street station; the line also connects to the Green Line at Snelling Avenue and University Avenue.

Buses enter and exit the station underneath Oak Station Place, a four-story apartment building. A two-story skyway allows traffic such as buses and cars to enter and exit. The building opened in 2012. Between 2019 and 2024, six apartment buildings were built within a .5 miles (0.80 km) that offered a total of 500 units. The area is one of the few places on the Blue Line outside of downtown that has seen significant development of housing.

== Services ==
From 46th Street station there are direct bus connections to the A Line and routes 7, 9, 46 and 74, and Minnesota Valley Transit Authority routes 436 and 446. HOURCAR, a local carsharing program, has a solar-powered charging station at 46th Street for the organization's fleet of plug-in Toyota Priuses. The Hiawatha LRT Trail, which runs along much of the METRO Blue Line route, provides connection for bicyclists to reach East Minnehaha Parkway and Minnehaha Park.

== Art ==
There are several art displays at the station including a turtle on the southbound station shelter which was added to reference the nearby Minnehaha Creek.
