= Minnesota State Highway 51 =

State highway in Minnesota

Trunk Highway 51
- Snelling Avenue
- MN 51 highlighted in red

Route information
- Maintained by MnDOT
- Length: 11.274 mi (18.144 km)
- Existed: 1933–present

Major junctions
- South end: MN 5 in St. Paul
- I-94 / US 12 / US 52 in St. Paul; MN 36 in Roseville
- North end: I-694 / US 10 in Arden Hills

Location
- Country: United States
- State: Minnesota
- Counties: Ramsey

Highway system
- Minnesota Trunk Highway System; Interstate; US; State; Legislative; Scenic
← MN 50	→ US 52

Minnesota State Highway 51 (MN 51) is a 11.274-mile-long (18.144 km) highway in Minnesota, which runs from its intersection with State Highway 5 (W. 7th Street) in Saint Paul and continues north to its northern terminus at its interchange with Interstate 694 / U.S. Highway 10 in Arden Hills.

Highway 51 is also known as Snelling Avenue for most of its route. A small section of the route is known as Montreal Avenue in the "West Seventh" and Highland neighborhoods of Saint Paul, and the northern section in Arden Hills is known as Hamline Avenue.

It provides a route for vehicle traffic, as well as the Metro A Line, a Bus rapid transit link operated by Metro. Snelling Avenue is also served by Snelling Avenue station on the Metro Green Line.

== Route description ==
State Highway 51 serves as a north–south route between Saint Paul, Falcon Heights, Roseville, and Arden Hills in Ramsey County.

It is not to be confused with nearby Ramsey County Road 51 (Lexington Avenue / Parkway), which runs parallel to State Highway 51 for much of its route.

Highway 51 begins at its intersection with State Highway 5 (W. 7th Street) in the "West Seventh" neighborhood of Saint Paul. 51 follows Montreal Avenue for 10 blocks. 51 then leaves Montreal Avenue and turns north on Snelling Avenue. Highway 51 remains on Snelling Avenue for the remainder of its route. It continues through the Highland Park / MacGroveland / Merriam Park areas to its junction with Interstate 94/US Highway 52. The route then passes Allianz Field and continues through the Midway neighborhood. After crossing over two railroad lines and entering Falcon Heights, the route passes along the east side of the Minnesota State Fairgrounds, making it a busy thoroughfare during the State Fair season. The route continues north into Roseville and Arden Hills. Most of Highway 51's length through Roseville and Arden Hills is an expressway (divided highway) with signalized intersections. Highway 51 does have an interchange with State Highway 36 in Roseville. The northern terminus of Highway 51 at I-694 in Arden Hills is also shared with the westbound interchange for U.S. Highway 10.

From south to north, the route adjoins the campuses of Macalester College, Hamline University, University of Northwestern - Saint Paul, and Bethel University.

Como Park, Zoo, and Conservatory in Saint Paul is located 7 blocks east of the junction of Highway 51 (Snelling Avenue) and Como Avenue. Eastbound Como Avenue becomes Horton Avenue. The park entrance is on Horton Avenue near Lexington Parkway.

Rosedale Center and Har Mar Mall shopping centers are located on the route in Roseville.

Highway 51 parallels State Highway 280 through Falcon Heights and the Midway neighborhood of Saint Paul.

== History ==
State Highway 51 was authorized in 1933.

The route was paved by 1935.

The original alignment on the south end of Highway 51 was from West 7th Street up Edgecumbe Road to Snelling Avenue. This section of Highway 51 was later rerouted to Montreal Avenue.

From 1934 to 1935, the north end of Highway 51 previously followed Snelling Avenue northbound to County Road B in Roseville, then 51 turned westbound to Fairview Avenue and ran northbound along Fairview Avenue and New Brighton Road to old U.S. Highway 8 in New Brighton.

By 1935, Snelling Avenue was extended north to the point where Highway 51 now bends to follow Hamline Avenue after crossing the Roseville / Arden Hills boundary line. The northern terminus of the route was at old U.S. Highway 10, which is the present day junction of Snelling Avenue and County Road E in Arden Hills. There was a plan until the 1970s to extend Highway 51 beyond its current northern terminus at I-694 in Arden Hills to proceed north to I-35W near Lexington Avenue in Blaine.

The section of Highway 51 in Roseville and Arden Hills was built as a divided highway by 1970.

== Major intersections ==
The entire route is in Ramsey County.

Location	mi	km	Destinations	Notes
St. Paul	0.000	0.000	MN 5 (West Seventh Street)	
St. Paul	1.248	2.008	CR 42 (Ford Parkway)	
St. Paul	1.873	3.014	CR 38 (Randolph Avenue)	
St. Paul	3.355	5.399	CR 35 (Marshall Avenue)	
St. Paul	3.546	5.707	I-94 eastbound, via Concordia Avenue	
St. Paul	3.605	5.802	I-94 westbound, via St. Anthony Avenue	
St. Paul	3.850	6.196	CR 34 (University Avenue)	
St. Paul	4.756– 4.778	7.654– 7.689	CR 33 (Pierce Butler Route)	Interchange
St. Paul	4.966– 5.017	7.992– 8.074	CR 32 (Energy Park Drive)	Interchange
St. Paul	5.209– 5.471	8.383– 8.805	CR 31 east / CR 75 west (Como Avenue)	
Falcon Heights	6.350– 6.360	10.219– 10.235	CR 30 (Larpenteur Avenue)	
Roseville	7.350– 7.357	11.829– 11.840	CR 25 (County Road B)	
Roseville	7.501– 7.778	12.072– 12.517	MN 36 – Minneapolis, Stillwater	Interchange
Roseville	7.909– 8.003	12.728– 12.880	CR 78 (County Road B2)	Interchange, Access to Rosedale Center
Roseville	8.377– 8.387	13.481– 13.498	CR 23 (County Road C2)	
Arden Hills	9.601	15.451	CR 50 (Hamline Avenue)	
Arden Hills	10.381– 10.508	16.707– 16.911	CR 15 (County Road E)	Interchange, Old U.S. 10
Arden Hills	11.245	18.097	I-694 / US 10 westbound	Interchange. I-694 exit 42A.
Arden Hills	11.295	18.178	CR 50 north (Hamline Avenue)	
1.000 mi = 1.609 km; 1.000 km = 0.621 mi: Incomplete access

== See also ==
- Stroad
