= XXXXVI Corps =

XXXXVI Corps, XLVI Corps, or 46th Corps may refer to:

- 46th Corps (People's Republic of China)
- XXXXVI Panzer Corps, Wehrmacht, Germany
- 46th Army Corps (Russian Empire)
- 46th Middlesex Rifle Volunteer Corps, United Kingdom
- 46th (Grocers) Lanarkshire Rifle Volunteer Corps, United Kingdom
- 46th (Swinton) Lancashire Rifle Volunteer Corps, United Kingdom

== See also ==
- List of military corps by number
- 46th Brigade (disambiguation)
- 46th Division (disambiguation)
- 46th Regiment (disambiguation)
- 46th Squadron (disambiguation)
- 46th (disambiguation)
