= 46th Cavalry =

46th Cavalry may refer to:

- 46th Arkansas Infantry (Mounted), sometimes called the 46th Arkansas Cavalry
- 46th Virginia Cavalry Battalion, Confederate States Army
- 46th (1st Belfast) Company, Imperial Yeomanry

== See also ==
- 46th Division (disambiguation)
- 46th Brigade (disambiguation)
- 46th Regiment (disambiguation)
- 46th (disambiguation)
