= 46th =

46th is the ordinal form of the number 46. 46th or Forty-sixth may also refer to:

- A fraction, 1/46, equal to one of 46 equal parts

== Geography ==
- 46th meridian east, a line of longitude
- 46th meridian west, a line of longitude
- 46th parallel north, a circle of latitude
- 46th parallel south, a circle of latitude
- 46th Street (disambiguation)

== Military ==
- 46th Army
- 46th Brigade (disambiguation)
- 46th Division (disambiguation)
- 46th Regiment (disambiguation)
- 46th Squadron (disambiguation)

== Other ==
- 46th century
- 46th century BC

== See also ==
- 46 (disambiguation)
