= 46th Street station =

46th Street station may refer to:

- 46th Street station (BMT Fifth Avenue Line), a former elevated station in Brooklyn, New York
- 46th Street station (IND Queens Boulevard Line), a subway station in Queens, New York
- 46th Street station (Metro Transit), a light rail station in Minneapolis, Minnesota
- 46th Street station (SEPTA), an elevated station in Philadelphia, Pennsylvania
- 46th Street–Bliss Street station, an elevated station in Queens, New York
- One of several bus rapid transit stations in Minneapolis, Minnesota:
  - 46th Street & 46th Avenue station
  - 46th Street & Minnehaha station
  - I-35W & 46th Street station

== See also ==
- 46th Street
