= Detroit Light Guard =

- Active: 1830–present
- Country: United States
- Allegiance: Michigan
- Branch: Michigan Army National Guard
- Garrison/HQ: Detroit
- Nickname: Tigers
- Motto: Let the Drum Beat
- Colors: Blue and Gold

The Detroit Light Guard is a military formation in the United States Army, Michigan Army National Guard that has served in many functions since its creation in 1830, including state duties, and even overseas combat. It is survived today in the US Army's 1225th Corps Support Battalion. The Light Guard's nickname, the "Tigers," is the origin of the name of the Detroit Tigers baseball team.

== Founding and early action ==
The Detroit Light Guard was first organized in 1830–31 in the Michigan Militia in the city of Detroit, and was known as the Detroit City Guard. On 24 May 1832, the Guards were mobilized for federal service for the first time. They joined the 1st Michigan Militia Regiment and served as a company under CPT Isaac S. Rowland. They joined a force of Army Regulars and militia to defeat the Sauk and Fox Indians in the Black Hawk War in Wisconsin, effectively ending Native American resistance in the Great Lakes region. The troops never saw combat, however. Exposure and the hardship of the march to the Mississippi River, coupled with an outbreak of cholera, took a heavy toll. Sickness and some deaths were reported. The militia unit was reorganized on 13 April 1836 as the Brady Guards under the command of CPT Rowland, and was recalled for federal service on 6 December 1838 to help state and federal authorities maintain order in the aftermath of conflict along the Canada–United States border in the Patriot War. They were mustered out on 22 February 1839, only to be reactivated on 1 March. They were soon mustered out on 31 May 1839.

The Brady Guards were reactivated for federal service during the Mexican–American War on 4 December 1847, where they joined with other militia companies to form the 1st Michigan Volunteer Infantry Regiment. The men were sent to garrison the various forts in the area to enable Regular Army units to move to the fight in Mexico. On 29 July 1848, the regiment was demobilized in Detroit. On 16 November 1855, the Brady Guards regained the name of the Detroit Light Guard and continued to serve state duty.

== American Civil War ==
At the outbreak of the American Civil War, many state militia and volunteer companies eagerly rushed to join the Union Army, and often got to fight as a unit. The Detroit Light Guard was one such company, and was soon designated as A Company, 1st Michigan Volunteer Infantry Regiment, after it joined up on 25 April 1861. The 1st Michigan was soon mustered into federal service for three months on 1 May in Detroit. This "three-months regiment" would go on to fight in the first major battle of the Civil War; the First Battle of Bull Run, where the Union was defeated by Confederate troops. Despite this inauspicious start, the 1st Michigan was reorganized into a "three-years regiment" on 16 September 1861 in Ann Arbor, Michigan. The Detroit Light Guards, now A Company, would have much hard fighting ahead of them. They would go on to fight in the Peninsular Campaign, the Second Battle of Bull Run, the Battle of Antietam, the Battle of Fredericksburg, the Battle of Chancellorsville, and the Battle of Gettysburg. After all this fighting, the men of the 1st Michigan were battle-hardened, and the regiment was officially reorganized on 1 March 1864 as the 1st Michigan Veteran Volunteer Infantry. These veterans would go on to engage the Confederates in the Battle of the Wilderness, the Battle of Cold Harbor, the Siege of Petersburg, and the Battle of Five Forks. The regiment suffered 15 officers and 172 enlisted men who were killed in action or mortally wounded and 1 officer and 149 enlisted men who died of disease, for a total of 337 fatalities. The men were finally able to return home when they were mustered out in Jeffersonville, Indiana on 9 July 1865.

== Post-Civil War ==
After the Civil War, the Michigan State Troops was reorganized numerous times; on 6 July 1874, the Detroit Light Guards formed A and C Companies of the 1st Infantry Regiment (Michigan). On 19 May 1876, they were reassigned to be A and B Companies of the 3rd Infantry Regiment (Michigan). On 1 May 1882, the Detroit Light Guards were organized as the 1st Separate Battalion of Infantry (Michigan), and then, on 3 July 1884, they were expanded and reorganized as the 4th Infantry Regiment (Michigan). On 31 December 1894, the Michigan State Troops were redesignated the Michigan National Guard. The regiment was broken up in 1898 and reorganized and redesignated as the 1st and 2nd Independent Battalions of Infantry (Michigan). They were redesignated again in April 1898 as the 3rd Battalion, 2nd Infantry Regiment (Michigan), and the 3rd Battalion, 1st Infantry Regiment (Michigan), respectively.

== Spanish–American War ==
When the Spanish–American War began, the former Detroit Light Guards mustered into federal service between 8–14 May 1898, and comprised the 3rd Battalion, 31st Michigan Volunteer Infantry, and the 3rd Battalion, 32nd Michigan Volunteer Infantry. The 31st organized and trained at Chickamauga Park, Georgia and the 32nd organized and trained in Tampa, Florida. In the camps, particularly at Chickamauga, disease was rampant, and the 31st was forced to evacuate to Knoxville, Tennessee after an outbreak of typhoid. It remained there until it shipped out to Cuba on 25 January 1899. The 31st landed at Cienfuegos and was then parceled out to the towns of Santa Clara Province to preserve order and protect property. The regiment performed guard duty until it returned to the United States on 25 April 1899. It was disbanded at Savannah, Georgia on 17 May 1899. While in federal service, 20 men died from sickness in southern camps and hospitals.

The 32nd Michigan Volunteer Infantry was one of the earliest regiments moved to Fernandina Beach, Florida, where it remained in camp for a while. It was among those assigned to service in Cuba but never left the United States. While en route to the island, its transport ship collided with another ship. The regiment was unloaded; it never left the port. After remaining in Florida for some time, the volunteers were transferred to Fort McPherson, GA, where they remained until September. The 32nd then returned to Michigan and was disbanded between 25 October 25 and 9 November 1898. While in service, 20 men from this regiment also died of disease. The men of the Detroit Light Guards never fired a shot against the Spanish, but they lost men to the war just the same.

== World War I ==
After several reorganizations after the Spanish–American War, on 30 September 1917, the men of the Detroit Light Guard were reorganized into the 1st Battalion, 125th Infantry Regiment (1-125), assigned to the 32nd Infantry Division for service in World War I. This division was made up entirely of men from Wisconsin and Michigan, and had many native German speakers, making for easy interrogation in the coming months. The 125th Infantry joined up with the 126th Infantry Regiment (formerly the 2nd Michigan) to form the 63rd Infantry Brigade. By early December, the 32nd had received the equipment assigned to it and was judged to be ready for deployment. War Department inspectors found the division more advanced in its training than any other division in the United States. Arriving on the Western Front in February 1918, they were the 6th AEF unit to come ashore in France. Over the next six months, the division was under constant fire, with only 10 days rest. The division took a leading role in three important offensives, fighting on five fronts, suffered more than 14,000 casualties, captured more than 2,000 prisoners, and never yielded ground to the enemy. The 1-125 served in the Second Battle of the Marne, the Oise-Aisne Campaign, and the monumental Meuse-Argonne Offensive. The 125th, including the Detroit Light Guard, was deactivated on 22 May 1919 at Camp Custer, Michigan. For their courageous service in World War I, the current Detroit Light Guard unit (the 1225th Corps Support Battalion), still wears the French Croix de Guerre with Palm.

== World War II and Cold War ==
The 1-125 was reactivated on 15 October 1940 to serve once again with the 32nd Infantry Division, but was released from division command on 8 December 1941 after the Attack on Pearl Harbor. The 32nd would go on to fight in the Pacific War, but the Detroit Light Guards would not join them. The 125th was deactivated at Camp Rucker, Alabama on 20 September 1945.

After World War II, the Detroit Light Guards were reactivated, this time as the 425th Infantry Regiment, headquartered in Detroit, and assigned to the 46th Infantry Division, the "Iron Fist Division." On 15 March 1959, another reorganization took place, and the Detroit Light Guards were redesignated as the 225th Infantry Regiment, a parent regiment under the Combat Arms Regimental System, to consist of the 1st Battle Group, an element of the 46th Infantry Division. The 225th attempted to keep the peace during the 1967 Detroit riot, but the riots did much damage to the city, and the 46th Division was disbanded. The Detroit Light Guards, now simply the 1st Battalion, were transferred to the 38th Infantry Division on 1 February 1968.

== Post Cold War to present ==
The descendants of the Detroit Light Guards were withdrawn from the United States Army Regimental System 1 September 1992, and were concurrently converted and redesignated as Headquarters and Headquarters Detachment, 225th Quartermaster Battalion. They were then converted, reorganized, and redesignated on 1 September 1997 as Headquarters and Headquarters Detachment, 1225th Support Battalion. On 8 October 2004, the 1225 was called into federal service and deployed in support of Operation Iraqi Freedom. While deployed to Iraq, the 1225 received the Meritorious Unit Commendation for its outstanding service in a hostile environment. The soldiers returned to Michigan and were released from federal service on 15 November 2005. The 1225th was once again ordered into federal service on 3 August 2010, and deployed to Afghanistan for one year in support of Operation Enduring Freedom. For this deployment, they went under the name "Task Force Light Guard."
