= 177th Brigade =

177th Brigade may refer to:

- 177th (2/1st Lincoln and Leicester) Brigade, United Kingdom
- 177th Armored Brigade, United States
- 177th Military Police Brigade, United States

== See also ==
- 177th Regiment (disambiguation)
