= Leonard C. Ward =

US Army officer (1917–2001)

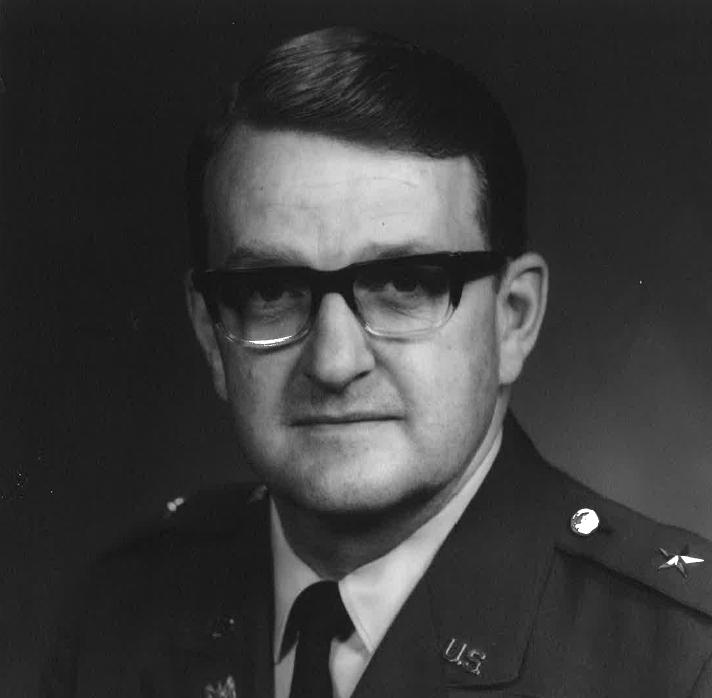
- Brigadier General Leonard C. Ward as Chief of the Army Division, National Guard Bureau, c. 1969
- Born: November 17, 1917; Virginia, Minnesota, US
- Died: March 20, 2001 (aged 83); Washington, D.C., US
- Burial place: Arlington National Cemetery
- Military career
- Allegiance: United States
- Branch: United States Army
- Service years: 1939–1972
- Rank: Brigadier General
- Units: Michigan Army National Guard; Army National Guard
- Commands: 107th Engineer Battalion; 46th Infantry Division; Army National Guard
- Conflicts: World War II
- Awards: Legion of Merit; Bronze Star Medal
- Other work: Information Management Consultant, Computer Sciences Corporation

Brigadier General Leonard C. Ward (November 17, 1917 – March 20, 2001) was a United States Army officer who served as Chief of the Army Division (now Director of the Army National Guard) at the National Guard Bureau.

== Early life ==
Leonard Cecil Ward was born in Virginia, Minnesota on November 17, 1917, and was raised in Minnesota, Oklahoma and Michigan. He graduated from the Michigan College of Mining and Technology (now Michigan Technological University) in 1939 with a Bachelor of Science degree in electrical engineering, received his commission as a second lieutenant of Engineers from the Reserve Officer Training Corps, and joined the Michigan Army National Guard. Ward later earned a Master of Science degree in information systems technology from George Washington University.

== World War II ==
Ward settled first in Ishpeming and later East Lansing, and entered active duty with the 32nd Infantry Division in 1940. He served in the European Theater during World War II, first as a platoon leader and company commander in the 107th Engineer Battalion, and later on the staff of the 1121st Engineer Combat Group, both units that were part of the V Corps.

== Post World War II ==
He continued his military service after the war, and graduated from the United States Army Command and General Staff College in 1948. He was promoted to lieutenant colonel in 1951, and from 1952 to 1957 he was commander of the 107th Engineer Battalion.

In 1957 Ward was appointed engineer staff officer for the 46th Infantry Division, and in 1959 he was named deputy chief of staff for operations (G3).

In 1962 Ward was promoted to colonel and assigned as the National Guard representative on the Army Staff at the Pentagon. He served until 1967, when he was assigned as assistant division commander of the 46th Infantry Division and promoted to brigadier general. He also served as the final commander of the 46th Division before it was deactivated in 1968.

== National Guard Bureau ==
In 1968 Ward was assigned to the National Guard Bureau as chief of the Army Division, succeeding Charles L. Southward. In 1970 this position was upgraded to a major general’s assignment with the title director of the Army National Guard. The director of the Army National Guard was authorized a brigadier general as a deputy, and Ward was appointed deputy director of the Army National Guard, serving until his 1972 retirement. He was succeeded by Joseph R. Jelinek.

== Post military career ==
After retiring from the military, Ward was employed by Computer Sciences Corporation, providing Information Management consulting services to the military, government and corporate clients.

== Awards and decorations ==
Ward’s awards included: Legion of Merit; Bronze Star Medal with oak leaf cluster; American Defense Service Medal; European-African-Middle Eastern Campaign Medal with Arrowhead device and five Battle Stars; World War II Victory Medal; Armed Forces Reserve Medal; Michigan Distinguished Service Medal; and Michigan Service Medal with three oak leaf clusters.

== Death and burial ==
In retirement Ward resided in McLean, Virginia. He died at Walter Reed Army Medical Center on March 20, 2001 and was buried at Arlington National Cemetery, Section 48, Grave 1974.
