= Ford & Woodlawn station =

Bus station in Saint Paul, Minnesota

Ford & Woodlawn
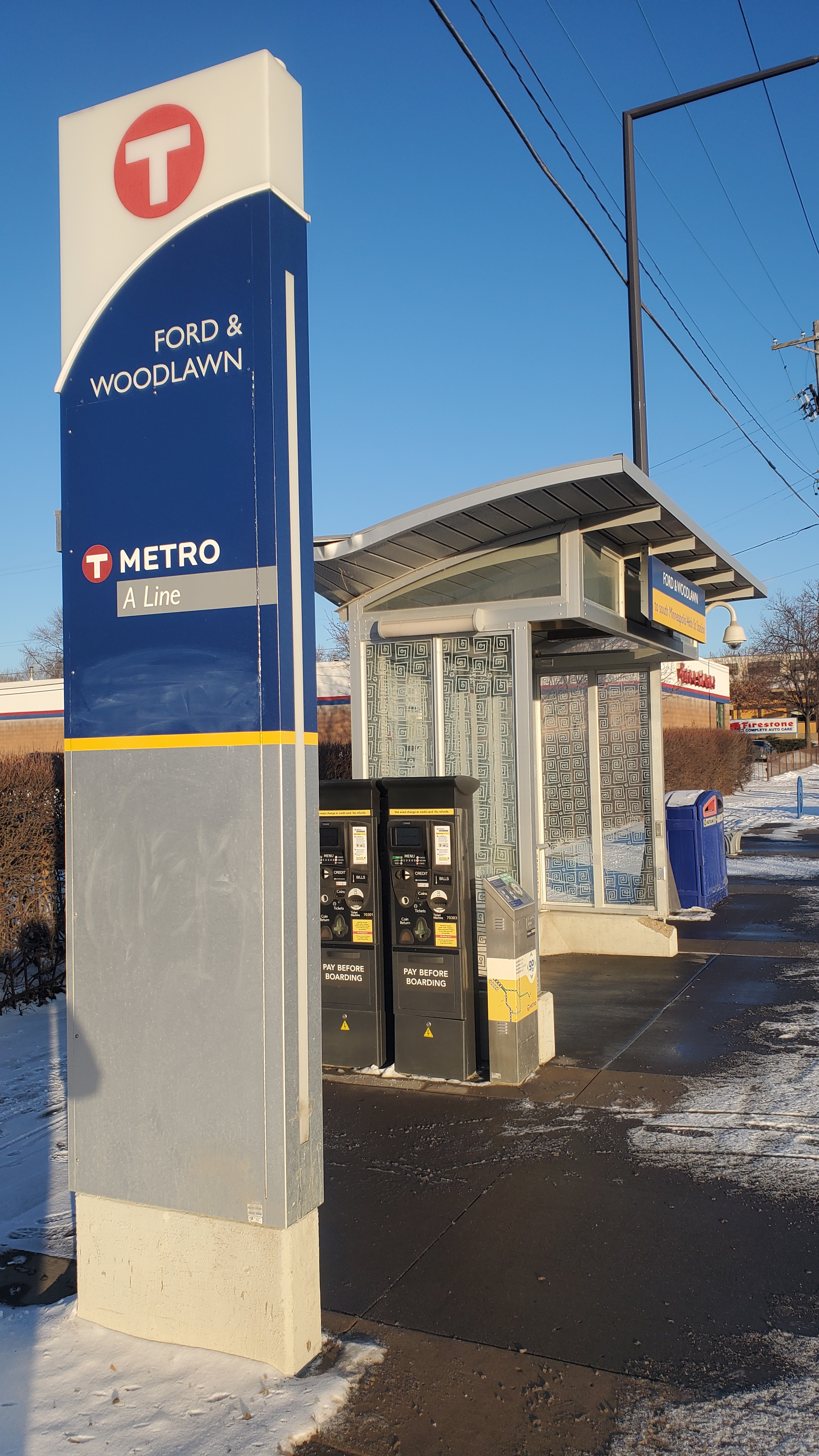

General information
- Coordinates: 44°55′4.54″N 93°11′46.93″W
- Owner: Metro Transit
- Line: A Line
- Platforms: Side platforms
- Connections: 38, 74

Construction
- Structure type: Small shelter
- Parking: No
- Cycle facilities: Yes
- Accessible: Yes

Other information
- Station code: 56127 (westbound); 56111 (eastbound)

History
- Opened: June 11, 2016

Passengers
- 2025: 109 daily
- Rank: 86 out of 129

Services
| Preceding station | Metro | Following station |
|---|---|---|
| 46th Street & 46th Avenue toward 46th Street | A Line | Ford & Finn toward Rosedale |
Location

Ford & Woodlawn is a bus rapid transit station on the Metro A Line in Saint Paul, Minnesota.

The station is located at the intersection of Woodlawn Avenue on Ford Parkway. Both station platforms are located east of Woodlawn Avenue. The station is situated directly north of the former Twin Cities Assembly Plant, 135 acres of land that will be redeveloped into a mixed-use neighborhood by the City of Saint Paul and Ryan Companies.

The station opened June 11, 2016 with the rest of the A Line.

== Bus connections ==
- Route 38 - 38th Street - Highland Village - Uptown - Hopkins - Opus
- Route 74 - 46th Street Station - Randolph Avenue - West 7th Street - East 7th Street - Sunray Transit Center

Connections to local bus Routes 38 and 74 can be made on Ford Parkway.

== Notable places nearby ==
- Ford Site
- Great River Road
- Intercity Bridge
- Keystone Senior Living
- Mississippi National River and Recreation Area
- Highland Park, Saint Paul
