= Ford & Fairview station =

Bus station in Saint Paul, Minnesota

Ford & Fairview
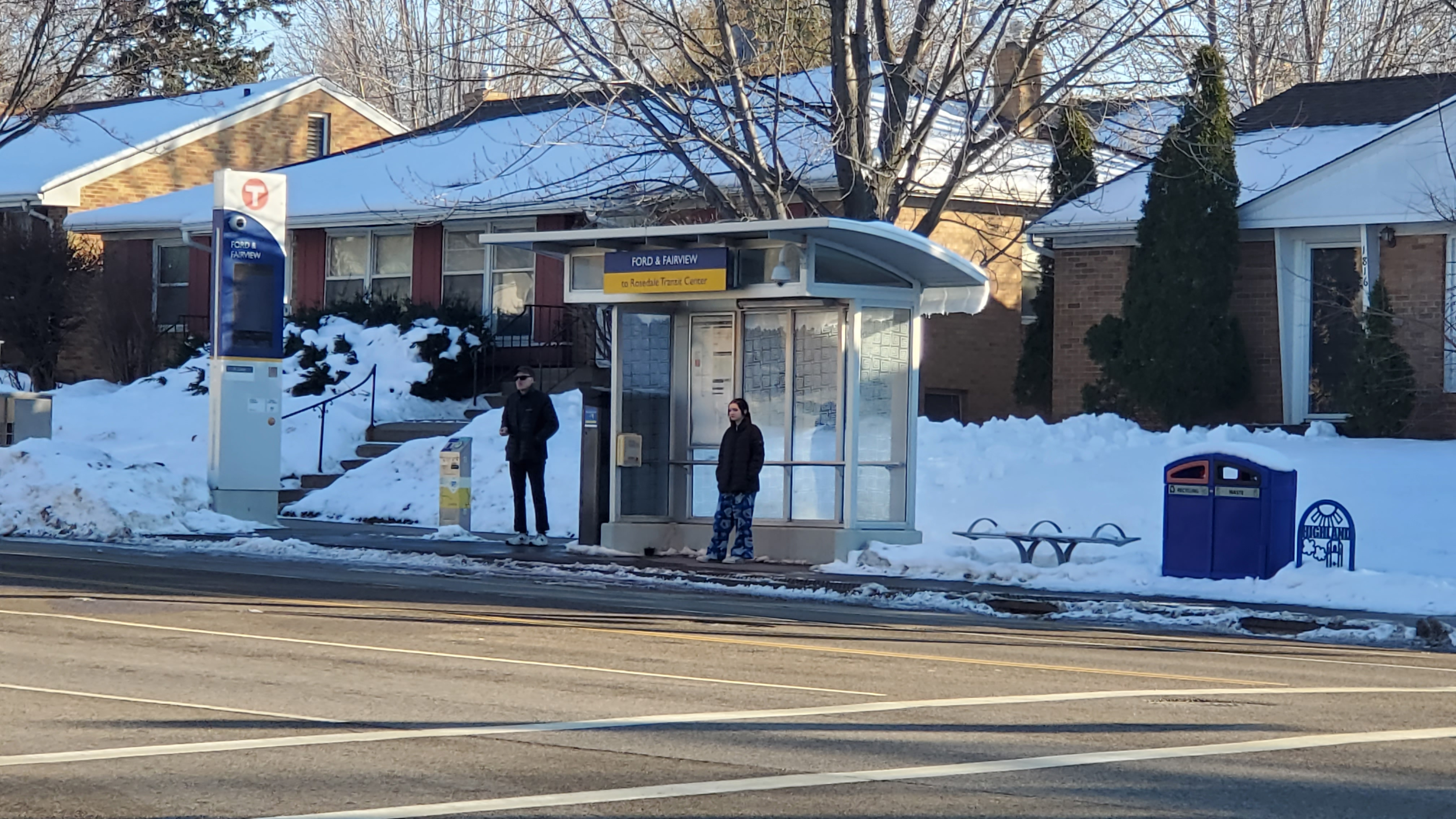
- The northbound station in 2023

General information
- Coordinates: 44°55′4.65″N 93°10′37.95″W
- Owner: Metro Transit
- Line: A Line
- Platforms: Side platforms

Construction
- Structure type: Small shelter
- Parking: No
- Cycle facilities: Yes
- Accessible: Yes

Other information
- Station code: 56124 (westbound); 56113 (eastbound)

History
- Opened: June 11, 2016

Passengers
- 2025: 30 daily
- Rank: 126 out of 129

Services
Preceding station	Metro	Following station
Ford & Kenneth toward 46th Street	A Line	Snelling & Highland toward Rosedale
Location

Ford & Fairview is a bus rapid transit station on the Metro A Line in Saint Paul, Minnesota.

The station is located at the intersection of Fairview Avenue on Ford Parkway. Both station platforms are located far-side of Fairview Avenue.

The station opened June 11, 2016 with the rest of the A Line. As of 2025, the station received the lowest average weekday ridership of any A Line station.

== Notable places nearby ==
- Highland Park, Saint Paul
