= Ford & Kenneth station =

Bus station in Saint Paul, Minnesota

Ford & Kenneth
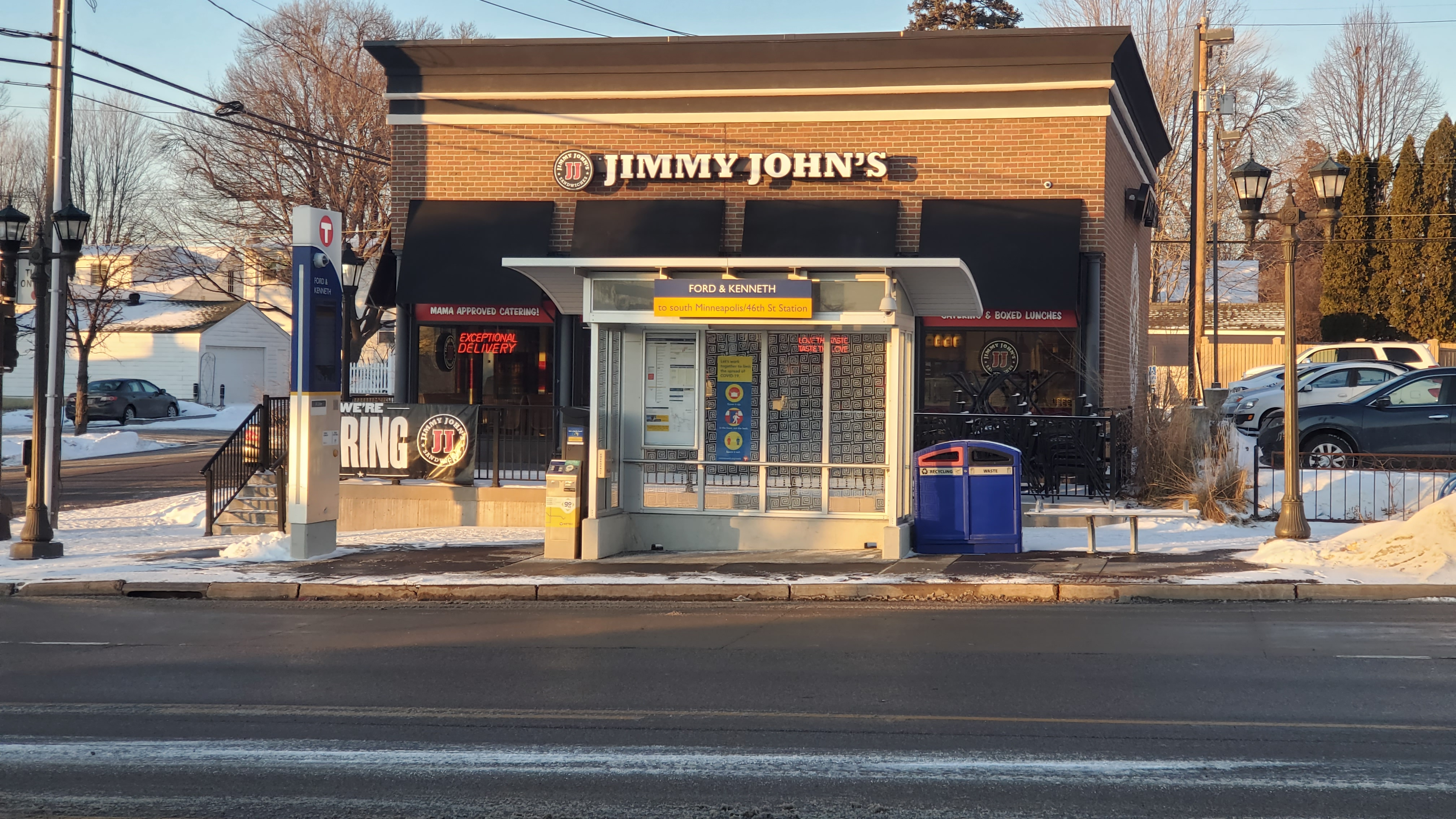

General information
- Coordinates: 44°55′4.54″N 93°11′5.31″W
- Owner: Metro Transit
- Line: A Line
- Platforms: Side platforms
- Connections: 38, 74, 87, 134

Construction
- Structure type: Small shelter
- Parking: No
- Cycle facilities: Yes
- Accessible: Yes

Other information
- Station code: 56125 (westbound); 4283 (eastbound)

History
- Opened: June 11, 2016

Passengers
- 2025: 122 daily
- Rank: 83 out of 129

Services
Preceding station	Metro	Following station
Ford & Finn toward 46th Street	A Line	Ford & Fairview toward Rosedale
Location

Ford & Kenneth is a bus rapid transit station on the Metro A Line in Saint Paul, Minnesota.

The station is located at the intersection of Kenneth Street on Ford Parkway. Both station platforms are located near-side of Kenneth Street.

The station opened June 11, 2016 with the rest of the A Line.

== Bus connections ==
- Route 38 - 38th Street - Highland Village - Uptown - Hopkins - Opus
- Route 74 - 46th Street Station - Randolph Avenue - West 7th Street - East 7th Street - Sunray Transit Center
- Route 87 - Rosedale Transit Center - U of M St. Paul - Cleveland Avenue - Highland Village
- Route 134 - Limited Stop - Highland Park - Cleveland Avenue - Cretin Avenue - Downtown Minneapolis

Westbound connections to local bus Route 38 on Kenneth Street and Route 74 can be made on Ford Parkway one block west at Cleveland Avenue. Connections to local Route 87 and limited-stop Route 134 can be made one block west on Cleveland Avenue.

== Notable places nearby ==
- Highland Park Library
- Highland Park, Saint Paul
