= Snelling & Highland station =

Bus station in Saint Paul, Minnesota, United States

Snelling & Highland

General information
- Coordinates: 44°55′11.58″N 93°10′1.27″W
- Owner: Metro Transit
- Line: A Line
- Platforms: Side platforms

Construction
- Structure type: Small shelter
- Parking: No
- Cycle facilities: Yes
- Accessible: Yes

Other information
- Station code: 17332 (southbound); 56114 (northbound)

History
- Opened: June 11, 2016

Passengers
- 2025: 98 daily
- Rank: 99 out of 129

Services
Preceding station	Metro	Following station
Ford & Fairview toward 46th Street	A Line	Snelling & Randolph toward Rosedale
Location

Snelling & Highland is a bus rapid transit station on the Metro A Line in Saint Paul, Minnesota.

The station is located at the intersection of Highland Parkway on Snelling Avenue. Both station platforms are located north of Highland Parkway.

The station opened June 11, 2016 with the rest of the A Line.

== Bus connections ==
This station does not have any bus connections.

== Notable places nearby ==
- Highland National Golf Course
- Highland Park, Saint Paul
