= 46 =

46 may refer to:

- 46 (number), the natural number following 45 and preceding 47
- One of the years 46 BC, AD 46, 1946, 2046
- 46, a 1983 album by Kino
- "Forty Six", a song by Karma to Burn from the album Appalachian Incantation, 2010
- 46 Hestia, a main-belt asteroid
- DAF 46, a small family car

== See also ==
- 46th (disambiguation)
