= Ford & Finn station =

Bus station in Saint Paul, Minnesota

Ford & Finn
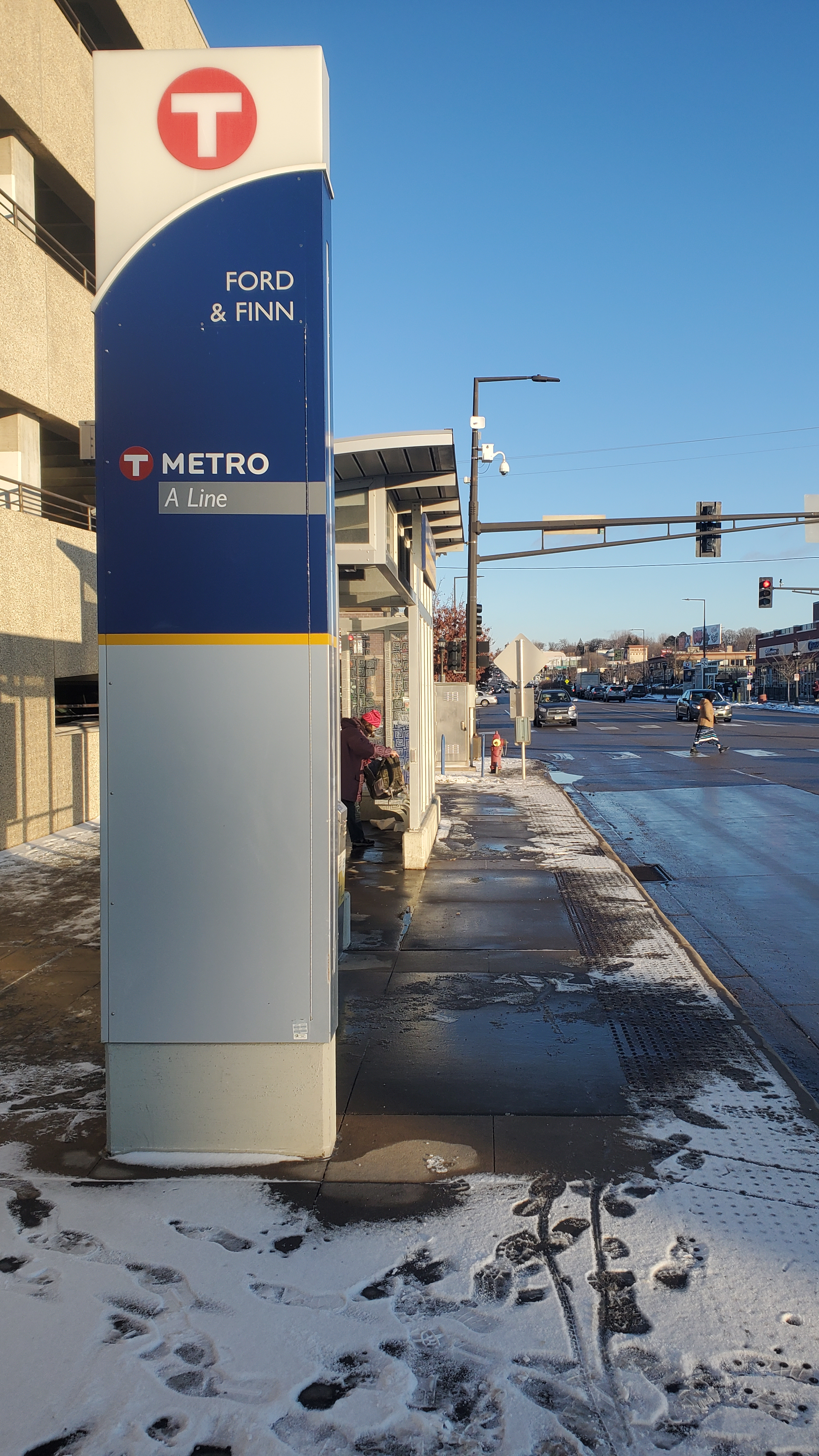

General information
- Coordinates: 44°55′4.58″N 93°11′22.24″W
- Owner: Metro Transit
- Line: A Line
- Platforms: Side platforms
- Connections: 38, 74, 87, 134

Construction
- Structure type: Medium shelter
- Parking: No
- Cycle facilities: Yes
- Accessible: Yes

Other information
- Station code: 56126 (westbound); 56112 (eastbound)

History
- Opened: June 11, 2016

Passengers
- 2025: 203 daily
- Rank: 55 out of 129

Services
Preceding station	Metro	Following station
Ford & Woodlawn toward 46th Street	A Line	Ford & Kenneth toward Rosedale
Location

Ford & Finn is a bus rapid transit station on the Metro A Line in Saint Paul, Minnesota.

The station is located at the intersection of Finn Street on Ford Parkway. Both station platforms are located far-side of Finn Street.

The station opened June 11, 2016 with the rest of the A Line.

== Bus connections ==
- Route 38 - 38th Street - Highland Village - Uptown - Hopkins - Opus
- Route 74 - 46th Street Station - Randolph Avenue - West 7th Street - East 7th Street - Sunray Transit Center
- Route 87 - Rosedale Transit Center - U of M St. Paul - Cleveland Avenue - Highland Village
- Route 134 - Limited Stop - Highland Park - Cleveland Avenue - Cretin Avenue - Downtown Minneapolis

Local Routes 38 and 74 share platforms with the A Line. Connections to local Route 87 and limited-stop Route 134 can be made one block east on Cleveland Avenue.

== Notable places nearby ==
- Highland Village
- Highland Park, Saint Paul
