= 46th Street & Minnehaha station =

Bus station in Minneapolis, Minnesota, United States

46th Street & Minnehaha
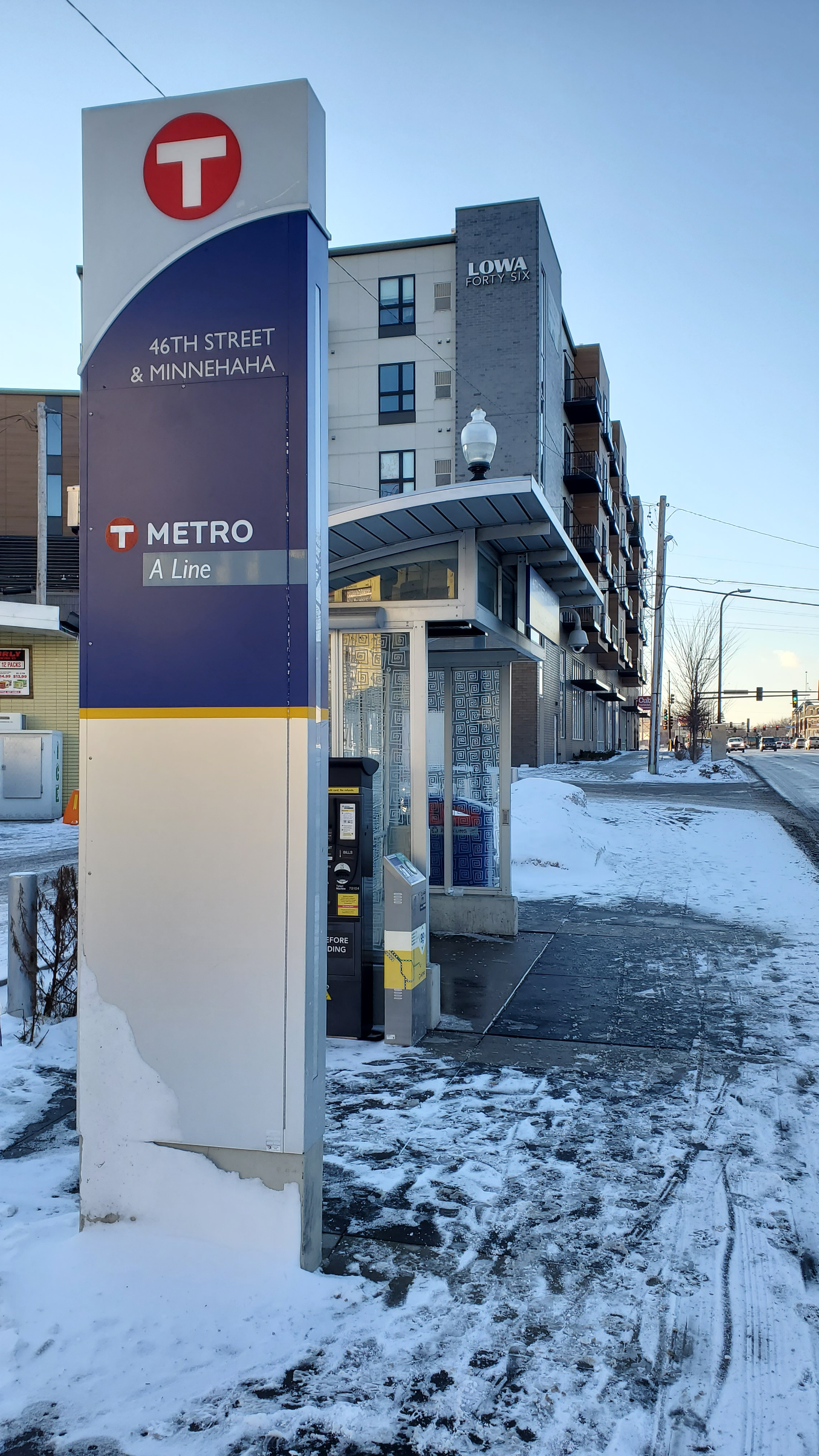

General information
- Coordinates: 44°55′10.9″N 93°12′53.99″W
- Owner: Metro Transit
- Line: A Line
- Platforms: Side platforms
- Connections: 7, 9, 74

Construction
- Structure type: Small shelter
- Parking: No
- Cycle facilities: Yes
- Accessible: Yes

Other information
- Station code: 16607 (westbound); 53362 (eastbound)

History
- Opened: June 11, 2016

Passengers
- 2025: 118 daily
- Rank: 85 out of 129

Services
Preceding station	Metro	Following station
46th Street Terminus	A Line	46th Street & 46th Avenue toward Rosedale
Location

46th Street & Minnehaha is a bus rapid transit station on the Metro A Line in Minneapolis, Minnesota.

The station is located at the intersection of Minnehaha Avenue on 46th Street. Both station platforms are located west of Minnehaha Avenue.

The station opened June 11, 2016 with the rest of the A Line.

== Bus connections ==
- Route 7 - Plymouth Avenue - 27th Avenue - Minnehaha Avenue - 46th Street Station - 34th Avenue - South 66th Street/Cedar Avenue
- Route 9 - Glenwood Avenue - Wayzata Boulevard - Cedar Lake Road - 36th Avenue - 46th Street Station
- Route 74 - 46th Street Station - Randolph Avenue - West 7th Street - East 7th Street - Sunray Transit Center

Northbound connections to local bus Routes 7 and 9 can be made on Minnehaha Avenue. Local Route 74 and eastbound Routes 7 and 9 share platforms with the A Line.

== Notable places nearby ==
- Minnehaha Mile
- Hiawatha, Minneapolis
