= 177th Military Police Brigade =

- Shoulder sleeve insignia
- Active: 1 April 1976 – present
- Country: United States
- Branch: United States Army National Guard
- Type: Military Police
- Size: Brigade
- Part of: Michigan Army National Guard
- Garrison/HQ: Taylor, Michigan
- Nickname: Tiger Brigade
- Motto: Eye of the Tiger
- Engagements: Operation Iraqi Freedom Operation Spartan Shield

Commanders
- Commander: COL Tiffianey J. Laurin
- Command Sergeant Major: CSM William J. Gribble

Insignia
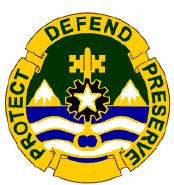
- Distinctive unit insignia

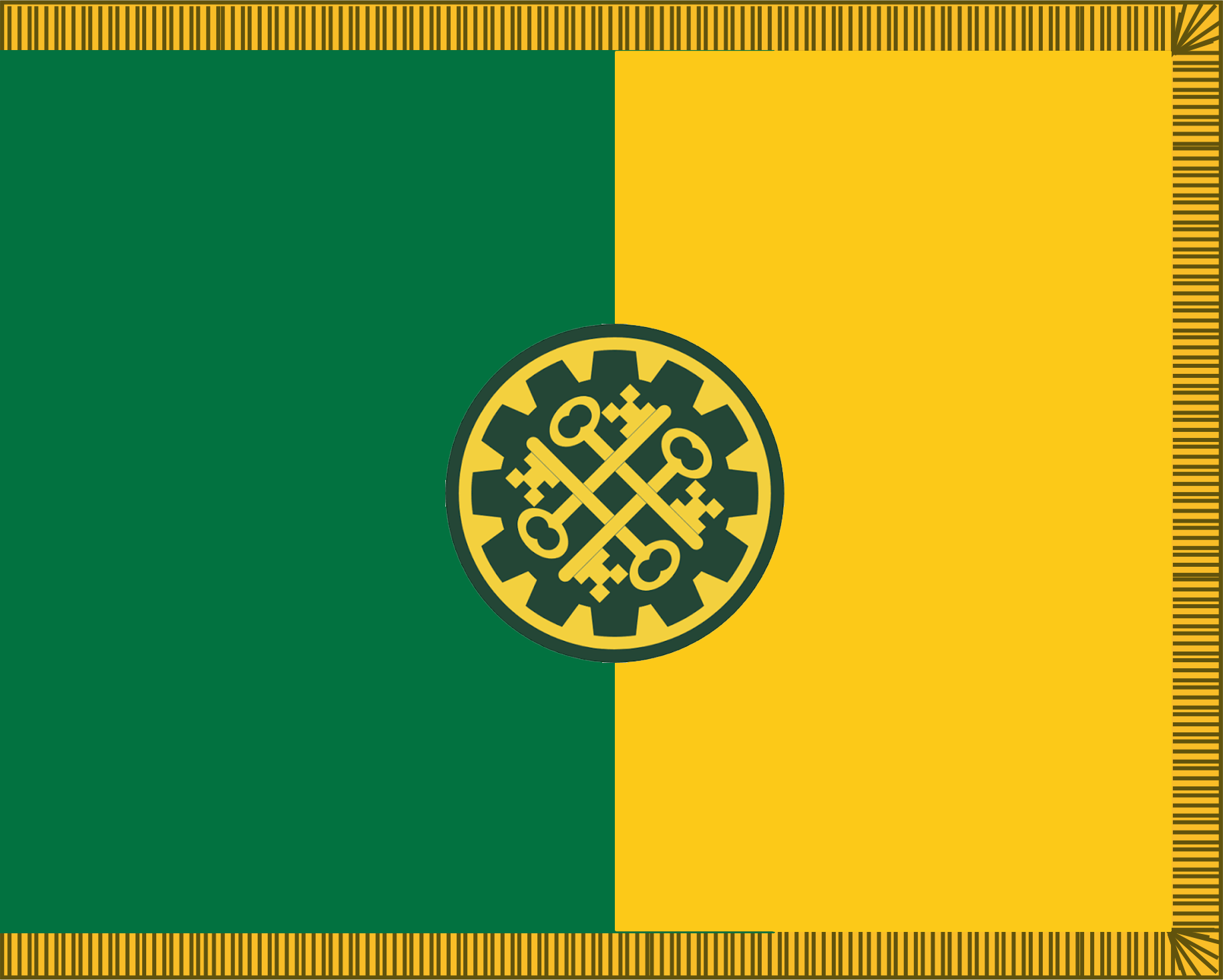
- 177th Military Police Brigade Flag

The 177th Military Police Brigade (Combat Support) is a military police brigade of the United States Army based in Taylor, Michigan. It is the largest component of the Michigan Army National Guard.

== History ==
The 177th Military Police Brigade was first organized on 14 June 1921 in the Michigan National Guard at Detroit as Headquarters and Headquarters Detachment, 1st Separate Squadron, Cavalry. It was redesignated on 1 July 1921 as Headquarters Detachment, 1st Squadron, 106th Cavalry, an element of the 22nd Cavalry Division. The unit was reorganized and redesignated on 10 April 1929 as Troop I, 106th Cavalry. It converted and was redesignated on 20 September 1940 as Battery E, 210th Coast Artillery, and subsequently relieved from assignment to the 22nd Cavalry Division.

It was inducted into Federal service on 24 February 1941 at Detroit before being reorganized and redesignated on 14 February 1944 as Battery A, 593rd Antiaircraft Artillery Automatic Weapons Battalion. It inactivated on 1 November 1944 at Camp Howze, Texas.

The unit was reformed on 20 January 1947 at Detroit as Headquarters and Headquarters Battery, 46th Division Artillery. It reorganized and was redesignated on 1 April 1960 as Headquarter and Headquarters Battery, 46th Infantry Division Artillery. It was ordered into active Federal service on 24 July 1967 at Detroit; and released from active Federal service on 2 August 1967 at which point it reverted to state control. It was reorganized and redesignated on 1 February 1968 as Headquarters and Headquarters Battery, 157th Artillery Group, and relieved from assignment to the 46th Infantry Division. It was redesignated on 1 February 1972 as Headquarters and Headquarters Battery, 157th Field Artillery Group.

The unit was converted and redesignated on 1 April 1976 as Headquarters and Headquarters Company, 177th Military Police Group. It received its distinctive unit insignia on 5 January 1977. It was reorganized and redesignated on 7 November 1985 as Headquarters and Headquarters Company, 177th Military Police Brigade. It received a shoulder sleeve insignia on 29 June 1988. The unit relocated on 1 September 1991 to Taylor.

== Subordinate Units ==
- Headquarters and Headquarters Company - Taylor, MI
- 210th Military Police Battalion - Lapeer, MI
  - Headquarters and Headquarters Detachment - Taylor, MI
  - 46th Military Police Company (GS) - Corunna, MI
  - 1775th Military Police Company (GS) - Pontiac, MI
  - 1776th Military Police Company (GS) - Taylor, MI
  - 460th Chemical Company - Taylor, MI
- 107th Engineer Battalion - Ishpeming, MI
  - Headquarters and Headquarters Company - Ishpeming, MI
  - 1430th Engineer Company (EVCC) - Traverse City, MI
  - 1431st Engineer Company (CECI) - Calumet, MI
    - Detachment 1 - Kingsford, MI
  - 1432nd Engineer Company (ESC) - Kingsford, MI
    - Detachment 1 - Gladstone, MI
  - 1437th Engineer Company (MBRC) - Sault Ste. Marie, MI
    - Detachment 1 - Marquette, MI
  - Field Service Company - Marquette, MI
- 507th Engineer Battalion - Kalamazoo, MI
  - Headquarters and Headquarters Company - Kalamazoo, MI
  - 1433rd Engineer Company (CECI) - Augusta, MI
  - 1434th Engineer Company (EVCC) - Ypsilanti, MI
  - 1436th Engineer Company (EVCC) - Montague, MI
  - 1440th Engineer Detachment (FFHQ) - Alpena, MI
    - 1439th Engineer Detachment (FFTM) - Alpena, MI
    - 1442nd Engineer Detachment (FFTM) - Alpena, MI
  - 745th Ordnance Company (EOD) - Grayling, MI
  - Field Service Company - Kalamazoo, MI
- 156th Expeditionary Signal Battalion - Howell, Mi
  - Headquarters and Headquarters Company - Howell, MI
  - Alpha Company - Wyoming, MI
  - Bravo Company - Kalamazoo, MI
  - Charlie Company - Howell, MI
