= 125th Infantry Regiment (United States) =

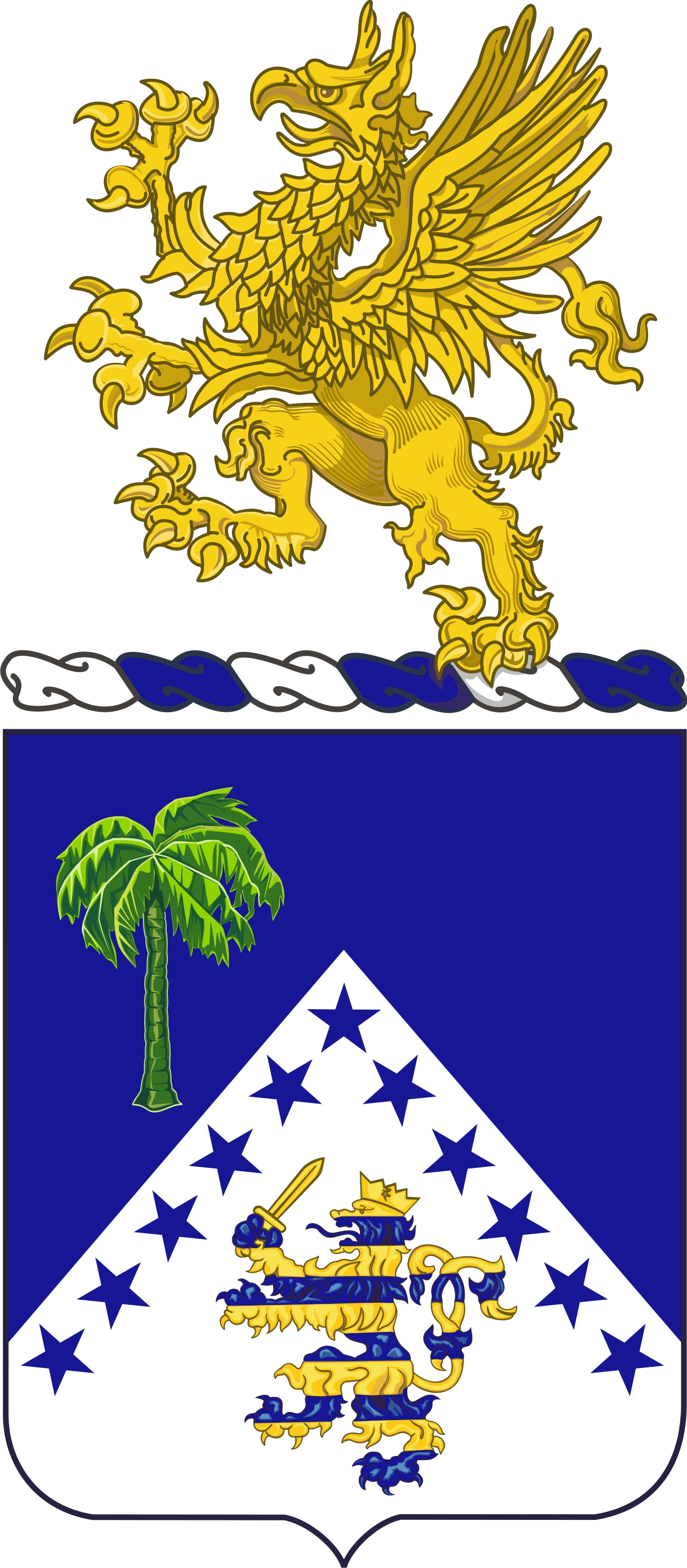
- Coat of arms
- Active: 1857 (founded), 1922–present
- Country: United States
- Branch: United States Army
- Type: Infantry
- Part of: 37th IBCT
- Garrison/HQ: Saginaw, MI
- Nickname: Third Michigan (special designation)
- Motto: "Yield to None"
- Engagements: Civil War; World War I World War II; Iraq; Afghanistan

Commanders
- Battalion Commander: LTC David Holoman
- Command Sergeant Major: CSM Darin Alexander

Insignia
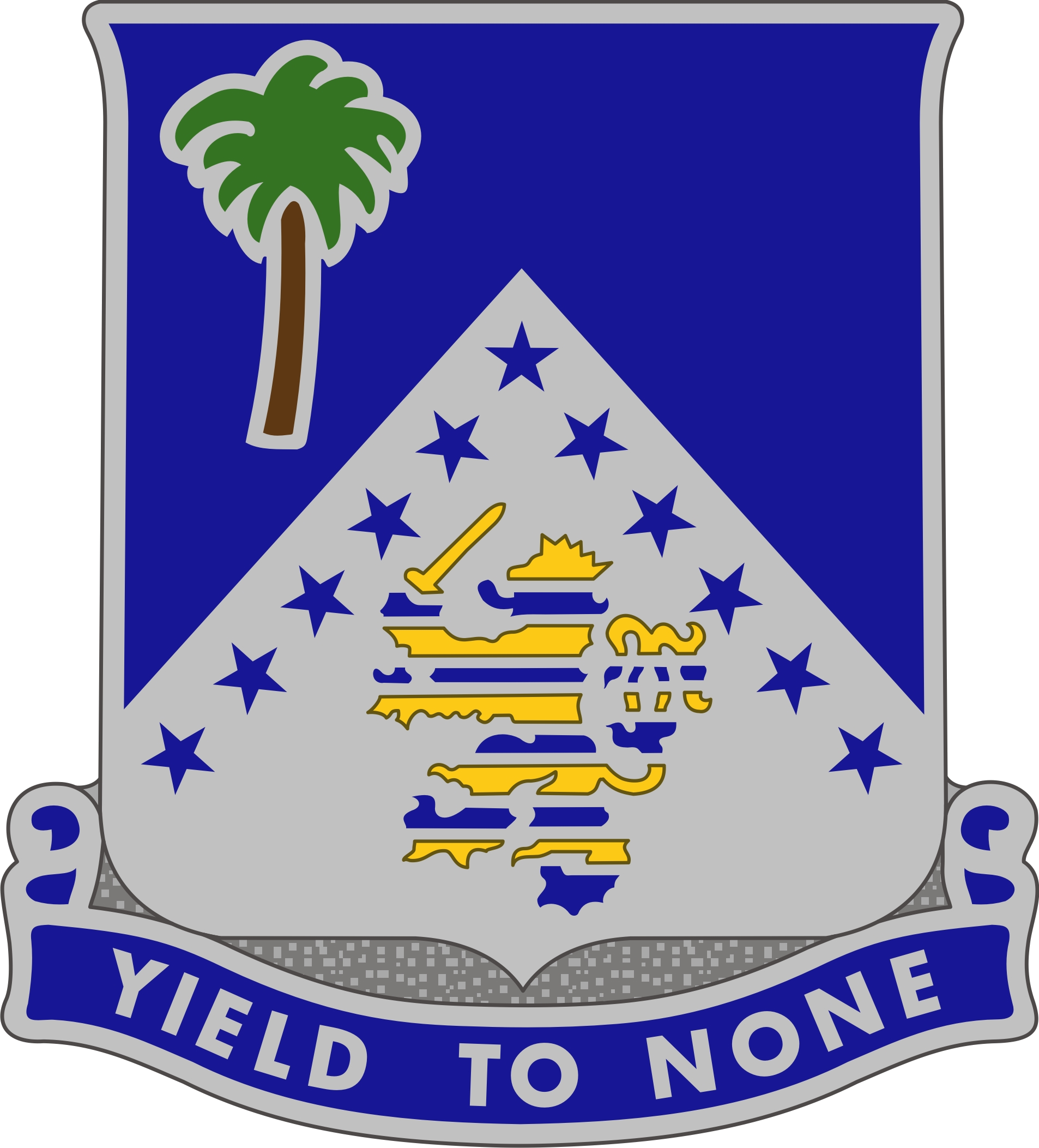
- Distinctive unit insignia

The 125th Infantry Regiment, Michigan Army National Guard, is a regiment under the U.S. Army Regimental System, with headquarters now in Saginaw, Michigan. The regiment currently consists of the 1st Battalion, 125th Infantry, an infantry battalion in the 37th Infantry Brigade Combat Team.

== Organization ==
The 1st Battalion, 125th Infantry Regiment currently oversees A Headquarters and Headquarters Company and 5 companies within the Michigan Army National Guard.

- Headquarters and Headquarters Company (HHC) - Saginaw, MI
- Company A - Detroit, MI
- Company B - Saginaw, MI
- Company C - Wyoming, MI
- Company D - Big Rapids, MI
- Company H (FSC), 237th Brigade Support Battalion - Bay City, MI

== History ==
=== Early history and formation ===
The 125th traces its lineage back to the 1850s when on 24 December 1857 and 4 January 1858, two respective militia companies were formed; the East Saginaw Guards and the Flint Union Grays. On 25 April 1861 the two companies combined and expanded to form the 2nd Michigan Volunteer Infantry Regiment. The regiment was mustered into federal service a month later on 25 May 1861 and fought for the duration of the Civil War. The regiment mustered out of Federal service on 29 June 1865. Companies from the Saginaw and Flint areas withdrew from the regiment in 1876 and consolidated with elements of the 1st Michigan Volunteer Infantry Regiment to form the 3rd Infantry Regiment. In April 1915, the 3rd Infantry Regiment was designated as the 33rd Infantry.

=== World War I ===
The regiment was mustered into federal service in June 1916 and was drafted in August 1917. The 33rd was combined with the 1st Battalion, 31st Infantry to form the new 125th Infantry Regiment. The regiment was assigned to the 32nd Infantry Division.

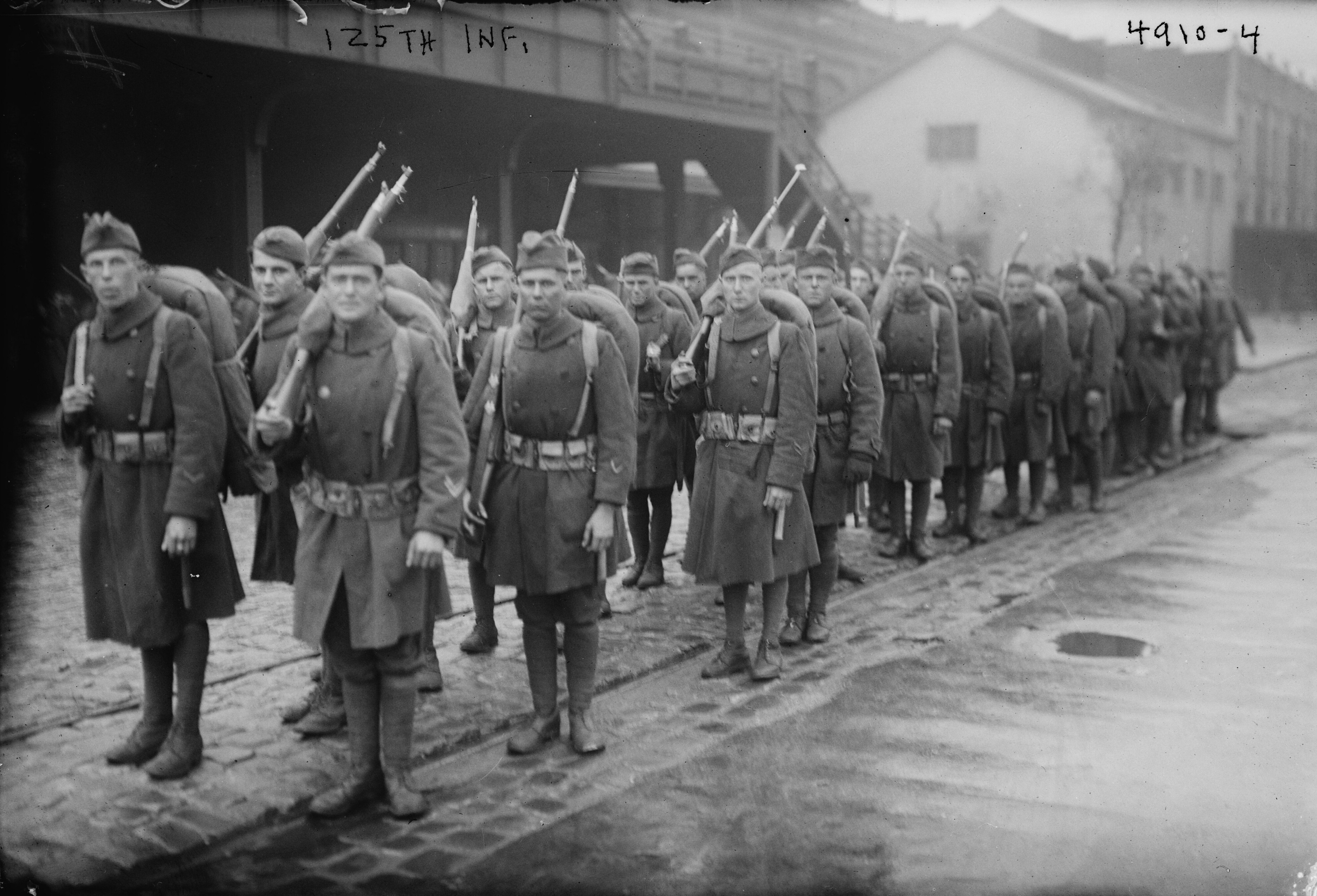
The 125th Infantry Regiment in 1919.

=== Interwar period ===
The 125th Infantry arrived at the port of New York on 9 May 1919 on the USS Great Northern and was demobilized 22 May 1919 at Camp Custer, Michigan. It was reconstituted in the National Guard in 1921, assigned to the 32nd Division, and allotted to the state of Michigan. It was reorganized 26 January 1922 and federally recognized with headquarters at Flint, Michigan. The headquarters was relocated on1 October 1927 to Detroit, Michigan. The regiment was called up to perform riot control during an automobile workers' strike in Flint, 13 January–16 February 1937. It conducted annual summer training most years at Camp Grayling, Michigan, from 1922 to 1939, and conducted joint summer training at Camp Grayling with the 85th Division's 338th Infantry Regiment in 1928. The 125th Infantry was inducted into federal service on 15 October 1940 and moved to Camp Beauregard, Louisiana, where it arrived on 27 October 1940, and was transferred on 19 February 1941 to Camp Livingston, Louisiana.

=== World War II ===
Due to the 32nd Infantry Division being converted into a "triangular division" of three regiments as opposed to the previous "square" division of four regiments, the 125th was relieved from assignment to the 32nd Division on 8 December 1941 and assigned to the Fourth Army, being sent to California to defend against a possible invasion by the Japanese. On May 1, 1942, the newly organized Northern California Sector and VII Army Corps included the 125th Infantry. The regiment served in California until February 1944, when it was sent to Camp Maxey, Texas under the XXIII Corps. Beginning in the spring, the regiment, reduced to a training cadre, provided an accelerated six-week course of infantry training (four weeks of familiarization, qualification, and transition firing, and two weeks of tactical training) to men who were formerly members of disbanded anti-aircraft and tank destroyer units or who had volunteered for transfer to the infantry from other branches of the Army. It was reassigned to the XXXVI Corps on 19 September 1944, and the Replacement and School Command on 17 November 1944. It moved to Camp Gruber, Oklahoma, on 10 December 1944 where it was reassigned back to the XXXVI Corps on 13 December, and back to the Replacement and School Command on 16 February 1945. It moved to Camp Rucker, Alabama, on 25 February 1945, and was inactivated there on 20 September.

=== Postwar ===
The regiment was assigned on 31 May 1946 to the 46th Infantry Division.

=== Recent history ===
==== 1-125th Infantry ====
Task Force 1-125 Infantry began flowing into Afghanistan in December 2011. Inclement weather delayed many of the battalion soldiers entry into theater until late January. Relief-in-place was conducted with the 2nd Battalion, 18th Infantry Regiment, 170th Infantry Brigade Combat Team for Forward Operating Base Kunduz, Kunduz City, Kunduz Province, Afghanistan. Other battalion locations were in Imam Sahib City, Imam Sahib District, Kunduz Province; Shir Khan Bandar, Imam Sahib District; and Doshi District, Baghlan Province. Each company deployed with a security force assistance team, consisting of a senior advisor and senior noncommissioned officer, along with several subject matter expert enablers. The companies conducted security force missions to secure the advising teams during key leader engagements and other meetings with their Afghan National Security Force counterparts. The SFATs partnered, assisted and advised their counterparts initially on operations, rule of law, logistics, training/administration, government/development and maintenance/signal. The main effort switched to logistics, with the intent of enabling the ANSF to be self-sustaining to increase their operational capabilities. This effort met with mixed results and led to another change in priority to operations and rule of law being the main effort with logistics and human resource operations as supporting efforts. During the spring, elements of the battalion closed one combat outpost, with SFAT operations in that area ceasing shortly after.

===== HHC =====
HHC was responsible for base defense operations and Mayor Cell duties of Forward Operating Base Kunduz. They improved operations and upgraded security by implementing new procedures during searches for entering the FOB. They had more than 7,000 entries in the Biometrics Automated Toolset System and vehicles searched and processed through the entry control point. They also developed and coordinated more than 50 base improvement projects to improve the quality of life for all FOB tenants.

===== A Company =====
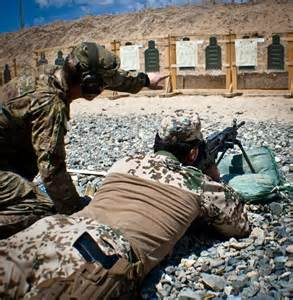
Ethan Bednar, a rifleman with Company A, 1st Battalion, 125th Infantry assists a German infantryman, assigned to Task Force Kunduz, firing a M249 light machine gun during range fire at Forward Operating Base Kunduz, Afghanistan

A Company was responsible for three distinct security force advisory missions: 3rd platoon provided security forces for the Khanabad District advising mission, which was successfully handed over to Afghan leadership; 2nd platoon provided SECFOR and helped strengthen the security and force protection measures for the Afghan Operations Coordination Center (Provincial), and the Provincial Headquarters in Kunduz; 1st platoon aided in teaching rule of law classes and provided SECFOR for the Gor Teppa area outside Kunduz City. Gor Teppa was the focal point and testing ground for the new evidence-based operations mission set that focused efforts on community-based policing and ANSF investigating and pursuing prosecution of crimes committed in the area.

===== B Company =====
B Company was responsible for the border crossing mission at Combat Outpost Shir Khan, along with supporting an SFAT.

===== C Company =====
C Company worked with an SFAT and the Afghan Uniform Police and National Directorate of Security in the Imam Sahib and Dasht-e Archi Districts. In late February, COP Fortitude was the scene of a peaceful demonstration that turned violent. Multiple soldiers were injured during this event. Company leadership demonstrated tactical restraint when they chose to use only non-lethal munitions and tactics to disperse the crowd of mostly peaceful demonstrators, with suspected insurgent agitators mixed in. In late May, the COP was dismantled and the area turned back over to the ANSF.

===== D Company =====
D Company conducted security force assistance for more than 300 Afghan Uniform Police in Baghlan province at the PHQ and Doshi district headquarters. As part of that mission, they conducted multiple combined dismounted patrols with the Doshi AUP. They also conducted multiple missions to the Salang Pass to ensure ISAF and civilian freedom of movement. During these missions, they aided in a security and recovery operation, as well as an assistance and humanitarian aid mission after an avalanche.

===== H Company, 237th BSB =====
H Company provided logistics and sustainment operations for the entire battalion. They brought the operational readiness rate of the battalion from 80 to 98 percent for more than 150 tactical vehicles. They also turned in more than $200 million of excess equipment and repair parts. The Distribution Platoon traveled more than 50,000 miles to ensure all locations had the necessary supplies and equipment to run their daily operations.

== Coat of arms ==
=== Shield ===
The shield is blue and white to difference it from the former coat of arms of the 125th Infantry Regiment, parent organization, now redesignated for the 425th Infantry Regiment, Michigan National Guard. The palm tree, eleven mullets (stars), and the crowned lion–all charges taken from this coat of arms–are applicable to the organization's historical background. The palm tree represents service at Santiago during the Spanish–American War, and the eleven mullets are for Civil War service. The crowned lion taken from the Arms of Hesse symbolize the organization's entrance into Germany during World War I.

=== Crest ===
The crest is that of the Michigan Army National Guard.

== Lineage and honors ==
=== Campaign streamers ===
Civil War

Bull Run
Peninsula
Manassas
Fredericksburg
Vicksburg
Wilderness
Spotsylvania
Cold Harbor
Petersburg
Appomattox
Mississippi (1863)
Tennessee (1863)

War with Spain

Santiago

World War I

Aisne-Marne
Oise-Aisne
Meuse-Argonne
Alsace 1918

War on Terrorism

Iraq:

Iraqi Surge

Afghanistan:

Transition I

==== Company A (Detroit), 1st Battalion, additionally entitled to ====
World War II

Northern France
Rhineland
Ardennes-Alsace
Central Europe

Korean War

First UN Counteroffensive
CCF Spring Offensive
UN Summer-Fall Offensive
Second Korean Winter
Korea, Summer-Fall 1952
Third Korean Winter
Korea, Summer 1953

War on Terrorism

Global War on Terrorism
Iraqi Sovereignty

==== Company B (Saginaw), 1st Battalion, additionally entitled to ====
War on Terrorism

Iraqi Governance
National Resolution (Iraq)

==== Company D (Big Rapids), 1st Battalion, additionally entitled to ====
World War II

Papua
New Guinea (with arrowhead)
Leyte
Luzon

=== Unit decorations ===
Meritorious Unit Commendation (Army), Streamer embroidered AFGHANISTAN JAN-SEP 2012
French Croix de Guerre with Palm, World War I, Streamer embroidered OISE-AISNE

==== Company A (Detroit), 1st Battalion, additionally entitled to ====
Meritorious Unit Commendation (Army), Streamer embroidered EUROPEAN THEATER
Meritorious Unit Commendation (Army), Streamer embroidered KOREA
French Croix de Guerre with Palm, Streamer embroidered OISE-AISNE

==== Company B (Saginaw), 1st Battalion, additionally entitled to ====
Navy Unit Commendation, Streamer embroidered ANBAR PROVINCE FEB –JUN 2006
Meritorious Unit Commendation (Army), Streamer embroidered IRAQ 2004

==== Company D (Big Rapids), 1st Battalion, additionally entitled to ====
Presidential Unit Citation (Army), Streamer embroidered PAPUA
Meritorious Unit Commendation (Army), Streamer embroidered IRAQ SEP 2006 – AUG 2007
Philippine Presidential Unit Citation, Streamer embroidered 17 OCTOBER 1944 TO 4 JULY 1945
