= 46th Street & 46th Avenue station =

Bus transit station in Minneapolis, Minnesota

46th Street & 46th Avenue
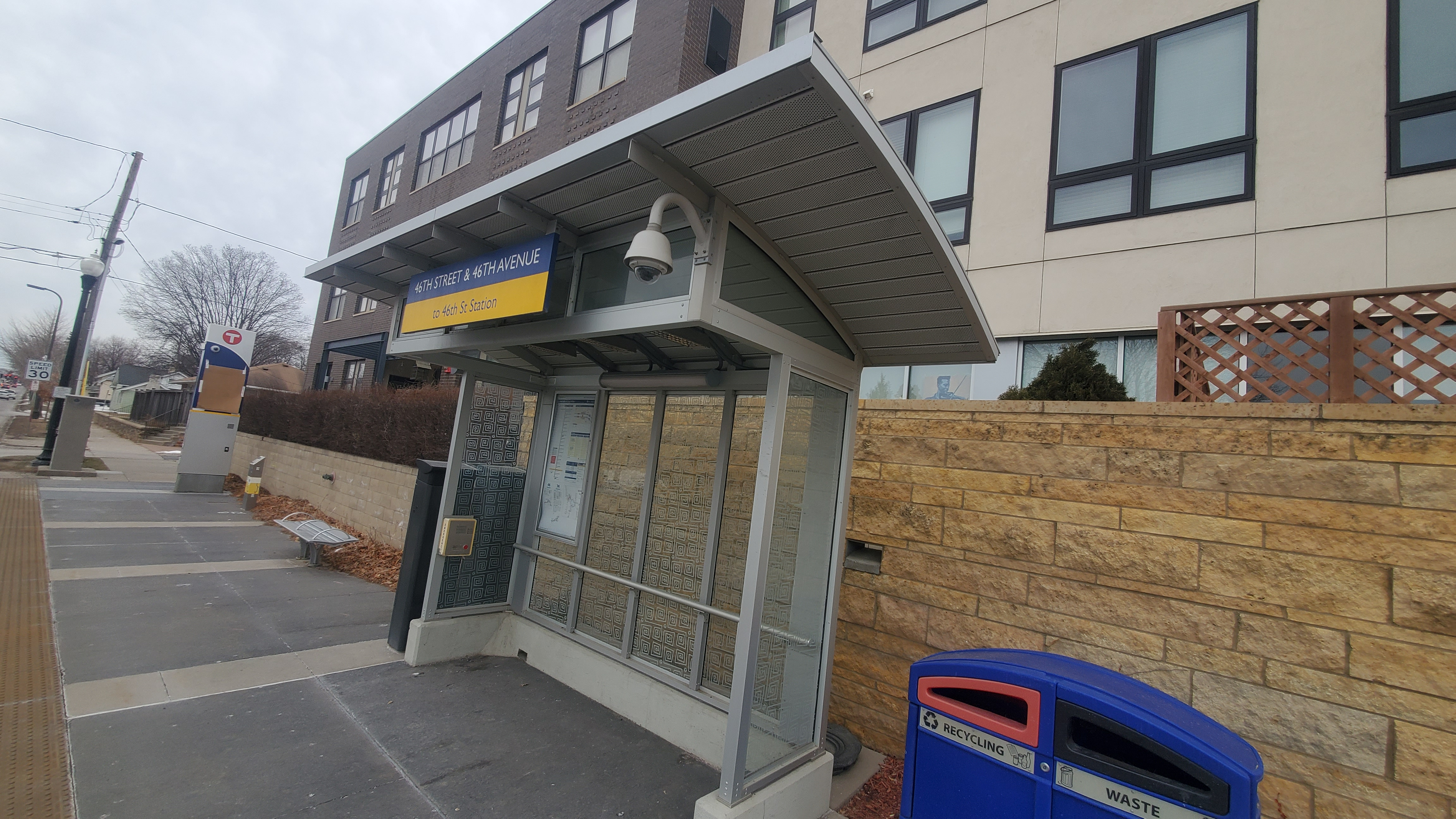

General information
- Coordinates: 44°55′10.99″N 93°12′28.12″W
- Owner: Metro Transit
- Line: A Line
- Platforms: Side platforms
- Connections: 38, 74

Construction
- Structure type: Small shelter
- Parking: No
- Cycle facilities: Yes
- Accessible: Yes

Other information
- Station code: 56128 (westbound); 51514 (eastbound)

History
- Opened: June 11, 2016

Passengers
- 2025: 48 daily
- Rank: 119 out of 129

Services
Preceding station	Metro	Following station
46th Street & Minnehaha toward 46th Street	A Line	Ford & Woodlawn toward Rosedale
Location

46th Street & 46th Avenue is a bus rapid transit station on the Metro A Line in Minneapolis, Minnesota.

The station is located at the intersection of 46th Avenue on 46th Street. Both station platforms are located west of 46th Avenue.

The station opened June 11, 2016 with the rest of the A Line.

== Bus connections ==
- Route 38 - 38th Street - Highland Village - Uptown - Hopkins - Opus
- Route 74 - 46th Street Station - Randolph Avenue - West 7th Street - East 7th Street - Sunray Transit Center

Connections to local bus Route 38 can be made on 46th Avenue. Route 74 shares platforms with the A Line.

== Notable places nearby ==
- Grand Rounds Scenic Byway
- Intercity Bridge
- Lock and Dam No. 1
- Minnehaha Park
- Minnesota Veterans Home
- Mississippi National River and Recreation Area
- Hiawatha, Minneapolis
