= 46th Division =

46th Division or 46th Infantry Division may refer to:

== Infantry divisions ==
- 46th Landwehr Division, Royal Saxon Army
- 46th Infantry Division (Wehrmacht), German Army
- 46th Reserve Division, Imperial German Army
- 46th Division (Imperial Japanese Army), Imperial Japanese Army
- 46th Infantry Division (Russian Empire)
- 46th Guards Rifle Division, Soviet Union
- 46th Rifle Division, Soviet Red Army
- 46th Rifle Division (1919 formation), Russian Red Army
- 46th Division (Spain)
- 46th Infantry Division (Syrian rebel group)
- 46th (North Midland) Division, United Kingdom
- 46th Infantry Division (United Kingdom)
- 46th Infantry Division (United States), United States Army

== Other divisions ==
- 46th Rocket Division, Soviet Union/Ukraine

== See also ==
- List of military divisions by number
- 46th Brigade (disambiguation)
- 46th Regiment (disambiguation)
- 46th Squadron (disambiguation)
