= 46th Brigade =

46th Brigade may refer to:

== Bangladesh ==
- 46th Independent Infantry Brigade

== British India ==
- 46th Indian Infantry Brigade

== Russia/Soviet Union ==
- 46th Radio-Technical Brigade

== Ukraine ==
- 46th Airmobile Brigade (Ukraine)

== United Kingdom ==
- 46th Infantry Brigade (United Kingdom)

== United States ==
- 46th Brigade, 38th Infantry Division of the Michigan Army National Guard

== See also ==
- 46th Division (disambiguation)
- 46th Regiment (disambiguation)
- 46th Squadron (disambiguation)
