= 46th Street =

46th Street may refer to the following New York City Subway stations in Brooklyn and Queens:

- 46th Street (IND Queens Boulevard Line); serving the E, F, M, and R trains
- 46th Street – Bliss Street (IRT Flushing Line); serving the 7 train
- 46th Street (BMT Fifth Avenue Line); demolished
