= 46th Infantry Division (United States) =

- 46th Infantry Division shoulder sleeve insignia
- Active: 23 June 1916–15 February 1917 (Supply Co. 32d Inf.); 23 July 1917–24 May 1919 (Supply Co. 126th Inf. Regt.); 28 November 1921–28 February 1946 (Service Co. 126th Inf. Regt.); 31 May 1946–1 February 1968 (46th Inf. Div.); 1 February 1968– (46th Brigade, 38th Inf. Div.)
- Country: United States
- Branch: United States Army
- Type: Infantry
- Size: Division
- Nickname: "Ironfist Division"
- Engagements: World War I; Oise-Aisne; Meuse-Argonne; Alsace 1918; World War II; Papua; New Guinea; Leyte; Luzon

Commanders
- Notable commanders: Leonard C. Ward

The 46th Infantry Division was a formation of the Michigan Army National Guard active between 1947 and 1968 as a division sized unit and from 1968 to 2004 as a brigade sized unit. It was initially headquartered at Lansing.

== History ==
The 46th Infantry has a long lineage with many of its units had previously been part of the 32nd Infantry Division going back to 1916. It inherited their lineage including streamers from both world wars. It was converted to the Reorganization Objective Army Division (ROAD) structure in March 1963. The Division's 2nd Brigade was assigned to the Selected Reserve Force, a higher-readiness component of the ARNG, in 1965. Virtually the entire division was involved in responding to the 12th Street riot in Detroit in July–August 1967.

The 1968 reductions of the Army National Guard, initiated by Defense Secretary Robert McNamara who felt that fifteen divisions were too many, reduced the division to the 46th Brigade (formed from the 2nd Brigade at Wyoming, Michigan), which was allocated to the 38th Infantry Division on 1 February 1968. The brigade was eliminated during Army restructuring in 2004.

=== Organization (1957) ===
By 1957 the division included the following units: Armories in parentheses, subordinate companies and batteries of battalions not shown.

- Headquarters, Special Troops, 46th Infantry Division
  - Headquarters Company, Special Troops (Lansing)
  - Medical Detachment and Division Headquarters (Lansing)
  - 46th Infantry Division Band (Grand Rapids)
  - 46th Military Police Company (Cadillac)
  - 46th Quartermaster Company (Midland)
  - 46th Signal Company (Ypsilanti)
  - 46th Reconnaissance Company (Detroit)
  - 46th Replacement Company (Lansing)
- 125th Infantry Regiment
  - HHC (Flint)
  - Service Company (Flint)
  - Heavy Mortar Company (Howell)
  - Tank Company (90mm Gun) (Monroe)
  - Medical Company (Bay City)
  - HHC, 1st Battalion (Saginaw)
  - HHC, 2nd Battalion (Flint)
  - HHC, 3rd Battalion (Port Huron)
- 126th Infantry Regiment
  - HHC (Grand Rapids)
  - Service Company (Grand Rapids)
  - Heavy Mortar Company (Greenville)
  - Tank Company (90mm Gun) (South Haven)
  - Medical Company (Grand Rapids)
  - HHC, 1st Battalion (Kalamazoo)
  - HHC, 2nd Battalion (Muskegon)
  - HHC, 3rd Battalion (Grand Rapids)
- 425th Infantry Regiment (all units at Detroit)
  - HHC
  - Service Company
  - Heavy Mortar Company
  - Tank Company (90mm Gun)
  - Medical Company
  - HHC, 1st Battalion
  - HHC, 2nd Battalion
  - HHC, 3rd Battalion
- 46th Division Artillery (all battalions had three gun batteries except for the 146th, with had four)
  - HHB (Detroit)
  - Medical Detachment (Detroit)
  - HHB, 119th Field Artillery Battalion (105mm Howitzer Towed) (Lansing)
  - HHB, 177th Field Artillery Battalion (105mm Howitzer Towed) (Detroit)
  - HHB, 943rd Field Artillery Battalion (105mm Howitzer Towed) (Jackson)
  - HHB, 182nd Field Artillery Battalion (155mm Howitzer Towed) (Detroit)
  - HHB, 146th Antiaircraft Artillery Battalion (Automatic Weapons) (Detroit)
- Headquarters and Headquarters Service Company (HHSC), 107th Engineer Battalion (Combat) (Ishpeming)
- Headquarters and Headquarters Detachment (HHD), 746th Ordnance Battalion (Lansing)
- HHC, 107th Medical Battalion (Detroit)
- HHSC, 246th Tank Battalion (90mm Gun) (Dowagiac)

As a result of the Pentomic reorganization, the division included the following units in 1960:

- Special Troops
  - Headquarters Company, 46th Infantry Division (Lansing)
  - 46th Aviation Company (Grand Ledge)
  - 107th Engineer Battalion (Ishpeming)
  - 107th Signal Battalion (Ypsilanti)
  - 46th Infantry Division Trains and 46th Infantry Division Band (Grand Rapids)
    - 46th Administration Company (Lansing)
    - 146th Transportation Battalion (Jackson)
    - 107th Ordnance Battalion (Lansing)
    - 107th Medical Battalion (Detroit)
    - 46th Quartermaster Company (Midland)
- 2nd Reconnaissance Squadron, 246th Armor (Detroit)
- 1st Medium Tank Battalion (Patton), 246th Armor (Dowagiac)
- 1st Battle Group, 125th Infantry (Flint)
- 2nd Battle Group, 125th Infantry (Flint)
- 1st Battle Group, 126th Infantry (Grand Rapids)
- 2nd Battle Group, 126th Infantry (Grand Rapids)
- 1st Battle Group, 225th Infantry (Detroit)
- 46th Infantry Division Artillery (Detroit)
  - 1st Howitzer Battalion, 119th Artillery (Lansing) – One 105 mm and one 155 mm battery
  - 2nd Howitzer Battalion, 119th Artillery (Lansing) – One 105 mm and one 155 mm battery
  - 3rd Howitzer Battalion, 119th Artillery (Jackson) – One 105 mm and one 155 mm battery
  - 1st Rocket/Howitzer Battalion, 182nd Artillery (Detroit) – One 8-inch Howitzer battery and one Honest John battery
  - 2nd Howitzer Battalion, 182nd Artillery (Detroit) – One 105 mm and one 155 mm battery
  - 3rd Howitzer Battalion, 182nd Artillery (Kingsford) – One 105 mm and one 155 mm battery

After the beginning of the ROAD reorganization the division had a strength of 7,948 on 31 December 1963. It included the following units under the ROAD structure, showing headquarters locations in parentheses:

- Headquarters and Headquarters Company (HHC), 46th Infantry Division (Lansing)
- 46th Infantry Division Military Police Company (Flint)
- HHC, 1st Brigade, 46th Infantry Division (Detroit)
- HHC, 2nd Brigade, 46th Infantry Division (Grand Rapids)
- HHC, 3rd Brigade, 46th Infantry Division (Flint)
- 1st Battalion, 125th Infantry (Flint)
- 2nd Battalion, 125th Infantry (Flint)
- 1st Battalion, 126th Infantry (Grand Rapids)
- 2nd Battalion, 126th Infantry (Muskegon)
- 3rd Battalion, 126th Infantry (Grand Rapids)
- 1st Battalion, 225th Infantry (Detroit)
- 1st Squadron, 146th Cavalry (Detroit)
- 2nd Battalion, 246th Armor (Dowagiac)
- 3rd Battalion, 246th Armor (Bay City)
- 46th Aviation Battalion (Grand Ledge)
- 107th Engineer Battalion (Ishpeming)
- 107th Signal Battalion (Ypsilanti)
- 46th Infantry Division Artillery (Detroit)
  - 1st Battalion (Towed 105mm), 119th Artillery (Lansing) – three batteries
  - 2nd Battalion (Towed 105mm), 119th Artillery (Jackson) – three batteries
  - 1st Battalion, 182nd Artillery (Detroit) – Three towed 155mm batteries, one 8-inch
  - 2nd Battalion (Towed 105mm), 182nd Artillery (Detroit) – three batteries
  - 3rd Battalion (Honest John), 182nd Artillery (Kingsford) – two batteries
- 46th Infantry Division Support Command
  - Headquarters and Headquarters Company (Lansing and Grand Rapids)
  - 46th Infantry Division Band (Grand Rapids)
  - 46th Administration Company (Lansing)
  - 107th Medical Battalion (Detroit)
  - 107th Maintenance Battalion (Lansing)
  - 46th Supply and Transportation Battalion (Midland)

=== Redesignation as 46th Brigade, 38th Infantry Division ===
The reductions of the Army National Guard, initiated in 1967 by Defense Secretary Robert McNamara who felt that fifteen divisions were too many for a reserve component, reduced the division to the 46th Brigade (formed from the headquarters of the 2nd Brigade at Wyoming, Michigan), which was allocated to the 38th Infantry Division on 1 February 1968. The division headquarters became the Michigan Army National Guard Emergency Operation Headquarters, while the headquarters of the 1st Brigade and that of the 1st Battalion, 225th Infantry became the headquarters of the non-divisional 1st Battalion, 225th Infantry. The headquarters of the 3rd Brigade and that of the 2nd Battalion, 225th Infantry became the headquarters of the non-divisional 46th Engineer Group (Construction), and the headquarters of the 46th Infantry Division Artillery became that of the non-divisional 157th Artillery Group, which included the 1st and 2nd Battalions of the 182nd Artillery.

The 46th Brigade gained the 1st Battalion, 125th Infantry, the 3rd Battalion, 126th Infantry, the 1st Battalion, 246th Armor, and Troop C, 1st Squadron, 238th Cavalry (the former Troop B, 1st Squadron, 146th Cavalry) for its maneuver elements. Its artillery battalion was the 1st Battalion, 119th Artillery, while Company D, 113th Engineer Battalion, Company D, 113th Medical Battalion, Company D (Forward Support), 738th Maintenance Battalion, and the 46th Brigade Administrative Section, 38th Administration Company formed its other support elements.

The 46th Brigade, 38th Infantry Division included the following units in 1970:

- HHC, 46th Brigade, 38th Infantry Division (Wyoming)
- 1st Battalion (Towed 105mm), 119th Artillery (Lansing)
- 1st Battalion, 125th Infantry (Flint)
- 3rd Battalion, 126th Infantry (Wyoming)
- 1st Battalion, 246th Armor (Dowagiac with Detachment 1 at Three Rivers)
- Troop C, 1st Squadron, 238th Cavalry (South Haven)
- Company D, 113th Engineer Battalion (Wyoming)
- Company A (Assault Helicopter), 38th Aviation Battalion (Grand Ledge)
- Company D, 113th Medical Battalion (Detroit)
- Company D (Forward Support), 113th Maintenance Battalion (Wyoming)
- 2nd Platoon, 38th Military Police Company (Wyoming)
- 2nd Light Truck Platoon, Company B, 38th Supply and Transportation Battalion (Wyoming)
- 46th Brigade Administrative Section, 38th Administration Company (Wyoming)

In 1985 the Brigade, still headquartered at Wyoming, consisted of the 1–125 Infantry, the 3-126 Infantry, and the 1–225 Infantry.

As part of United States Army restructuring, the brigade headquarters was eliminated in 2004–2005, with the official inactivation ceremony on 1 October 2004. Its last commander was Colonel William Ewald. At the time, the brigade numbered 1,600 soldiers, and its 1st Battalion, 119th Field Artillery temporarily transferred to the 177th Military Police Brigade although it would see service with the 42nd Infantry Division during the war on terror, while most units remained with the 38th Division.

== Commanders ==
- Brigadier General Ralph A. Loveland (24 April 1947 – 31 January 1954; promoted to major general 8 June 1948)
- Brigadier General Gordon A. MacDonald (1 February 1954 – 1 November 1959; promoted to major general 1954)
- Major General Cecil J. Kennedy (3 November 1959 – 1 March 1962)
- Major General Cecil L. Simmons (1 March 1962 – 1 January 1968)
- Brigadier General Leonard C. Ward (acting; January 1968)
- Brigadier General Robert T. Williams (acting; January 1968)
