= 46 Squadron =

46 Squadron or 46th Squadron may refer to:

- No. 46 Squadron (Finland), a unit of the Finnish Air Force
- No. 46 Squadron RAF, a unit of the United Kingdom Royal Air Force
- Attack Squadron 46 (United States Navy), a unit of the United States Navy

== See also ==
- 46th Division (disambiguation)
- 46th Brigade (disambiguation)
- 46th Regiment (disambiguation)
