= 46th Regiment =

46th Regiment or 46th Infantry Regiment may refer to:

== United Kingdom ==
- 46th (South Devonshire) Regiment of Foot, a unit of the British Army
- 46th (Liverpool Welsh) Royal Tank Regiment, a unit of the British Army
- 46th Infantry Brigade (United Kingdom), a unit of the British Army

== United States ==
- 46th Infantry Regiment (United States), a unit of the United States Army

=== American Civil War regiments ===
==== Union (Northern) Army regiments ====
- 46th Illinois Volunteer Infantry Regiment
- 46th Iowa Volunteer Infantry Regiment
- 46th Wisconsin Volunteer Infantry Regiment
- 46th Indiana Infantry Regiment
- 46th New York Volunteer Infantry
- 46th Ohio Infantry
- 46th United States Colored Infantry

==== Confederate (Southern) Army regiments ====
- 46th North Carolina Infantry Regiment
- 46th Virginia Infantry Regiment (Pendleton County, West Virginia), a Virginia State Unit
- 46th Arkansas Infantry (Mounted)
- 46th Virginia Infantry

== See also ==
- 46th Division (disambiguation)
- 46th Brigade (disambiguation)
- 46th Squadron (disambiguation)
